= Thiele and Ladiges' taxonomic arrangement of Banksia =

1996 arrangement of the Australian plant genus Banksia

Kevin Thiele and Pauline Ladiges taxonomic arrangement of Banksia, published in 1996, was a novel taxonomic arrangement that was intended to align the taxonomy of Banksia more closely with the phylogeny that they had inferred from their cladistic analysis of the genus. It replaced Alex George's 1981 arrangement, but most aspects were not accepted by George, and it was soon replaced by a 1999 revision of George's arrangement. However some herbaria have continued to follow Thiele and Ladiges on some points.

== Background ==
Banksia is a genus of around 80 species in the plant family Proteaceae. An iconic Australian wildflower and popular garden plant, they are easily recognised by their characteristic flower spikes and fruiting "cones". They grow in forms varying from prostrate woody shrubs to trees up to 35 metres tall, and occur in all but the most arid areas of Australia. As heavy producers of nectar, they are important sources of food for nectariferous animals such as honeyeaters and honey possums, and they are of economic importance to the nursery and cut flower industries. However they are seriously threatened by a number of processes including land clearing, frequent burning, and disease, and a number of species are rare and endangered.

Specimens of Banksia were first collected by Sir Joseph Banks and Dr Daniel Solander, naturalists on HM Bark Endeavour during Lieutenant (later Captain) James Cook's 1770 voyage to the Pacific Ocean. A number of arrangements were published in the 1800s, culminating in George Bentham's 1870 arrangement published in Flora Australiensis. This arrangement would stand for over a hundred years, before finally being replaced in 1981 by Alex George's revision, published in his landmark monograph The genus Banksia L.f. (Proteaceae).

== Thiele and Ladiges' arrangement ==
In 1996, Kevin Thiele and Pauline Ladiges published a cladistic analysis of the genus Banksia in the journal Australian Systematic Botany. As their cladogram differed substantially from the current taxonomic arrangement, they published a revised arrangement that accorded better with their results. Four varieties were promoted to species rank: B. conferta var. penicillata to B. penicillata (now B. conferta subsp. penicillata); B. gardneri var. brevidentata to B. brevidentata; B. gardneri var. hiemalis to B. hiemalis; and B. sphaerocarpa var. dolichostyla to B. dolichostyla. Two new series and elevensubseries were introduced; B. sect. Oncostylis and B. ser. Crocinae were discarded; and B. ser. Cyrtostylis was largely redefined. Six species were left incertae sedis.

Thiele and Ladiges' 1996 taxonomic arrangement of Banksia was as follows:

Banksia

B. subg. Isostylis

B. ilicifolia
B. cuneata
B. oligantha

B. elegans (incertae sedis)
B. subg. Banksia

B. ser. Tetragonae

B. elderiana
B. lemanniana
B. caleyi
B. aculeata

B. ser. Lindleyanae

B. lindleyana

B. ser. Banksia

B. subser. Banksia

B. ornata
B. serrata
B. aemula

B. subser. Cratistylis

B. candolleana
B. sceptrum
B. baxteri
B. speciosa
B. menziesii
B. burdettii
B. victoriae
B. hookeriana
B. prionotes

B. baueri (incertae sedis)
B. lullfitzii (incertae sedis)
B. attenuata (incertae sedis)
B. ashbyi (incertae sedis)
B. coccinea (incertae sedis)
B. ser. Prostratae

B. petiolaris
B. repens
B. chamaephyton
B. blechnifolia
B. hiemalis (now B. gardneri var. hiemalis)
B. gardneri
B. brevidentata (now B. gardneri var. brevidentata)
B. goodii

B. ser. Cyrtostylis

B. pilostylis
B. media
B. epica
B. praemorsa

B. ser. Ochraceae

B. benthamiana
B. audax
B. laevigata

B. laevigata subsp. laevigata
B. laevigata subsp. fuscolutea

B. ser. Grandes

B. grandis
B. solandri

B. ser. Salicinae

B. subser. Acclives

B. oblongifolia
B. plagiocarpa
B. robur
B. dentata

B. subser. Integrifoliae

B. marginata
B. conferta
B. penicillata (now B. conferta subsp. penicillata)
B. paludosa
B. canei
B. saxicola
B. integrifolia

B. integrifolia subsp. integrifolia
B. integrifolia subsp. monticola
B. integrifolia subsp. compar
B. integrifolia subsp. aquilonia (now B. aquilonia)

B. ser. Spicigerae

Banksia subser. Spinulosae

B. spinulosa

B. spinulosa var. spinulosa
B. spinulosa var. collina
B. spinulosa var. cunninghamii
B. spinulosa var. neoanglica

B. subser. Ericifoliae

B. ericifolia

B. ericifolia var. ericifolia
B. ericifolia var. macrantha

B. subser. Occidentales

B. occidentalis
B. brownii
B. seminuda
B. verticillata
B. littoralis

B. ser. Quercinae

B. quercifolia
B. oreophila

B. ser. Dryandroideae

B. dryandroides

B. ser. Abietinae

B. subser. Nutantes

B. nutans

B. nutans var. nutans
B. nutans var. cernuella

B. subser. Sphaerocarpae

B. grossa
B. dolichostyla (now B. sphaerocarpa var. dolichostyla)
B. micrantha
B. sphaerocarpa

B. sphaerocarpa var. sphaerocarpa
B. sphaerocarpa var. caesia

B. subser. Leptophyllae

B. telmatiaea
B. scabrella
B. leptophylla

B. leptophylla var. melletica
B. leptophylla var. leptophylla

B. lanata

B. subser. Longistyles

B. violacea
B. laricina
B. incana
B. tricuspis
B. pulchella
B. meisneri

B. meisneri var. meisneri
B. meisneri var. ascendens

== Legacy ==
In 1999, George published a revised taxonomic arrangement of Banksia as part of the Flora of Australia series of monographs. He stated that "the infrageneric classification and systematic sequence presented here are modified from that of George (1981) and take into account new data revealed in the work of Thiele & Ladiges (1996)". However, Thiele and Ladiges' arrangement was largely rejected. None of the four promotions to species rank was accepted, and none of the thirteen infrageneric taxa introduced by Thiele and Ladiges was retained. However a number of Australian herbaria have continued to follow Thiele and Ladiges on some points, for example by recognising the four species that they promoted.
