= Taxonomy of Banksia =

Classification of the plant genus Banksia

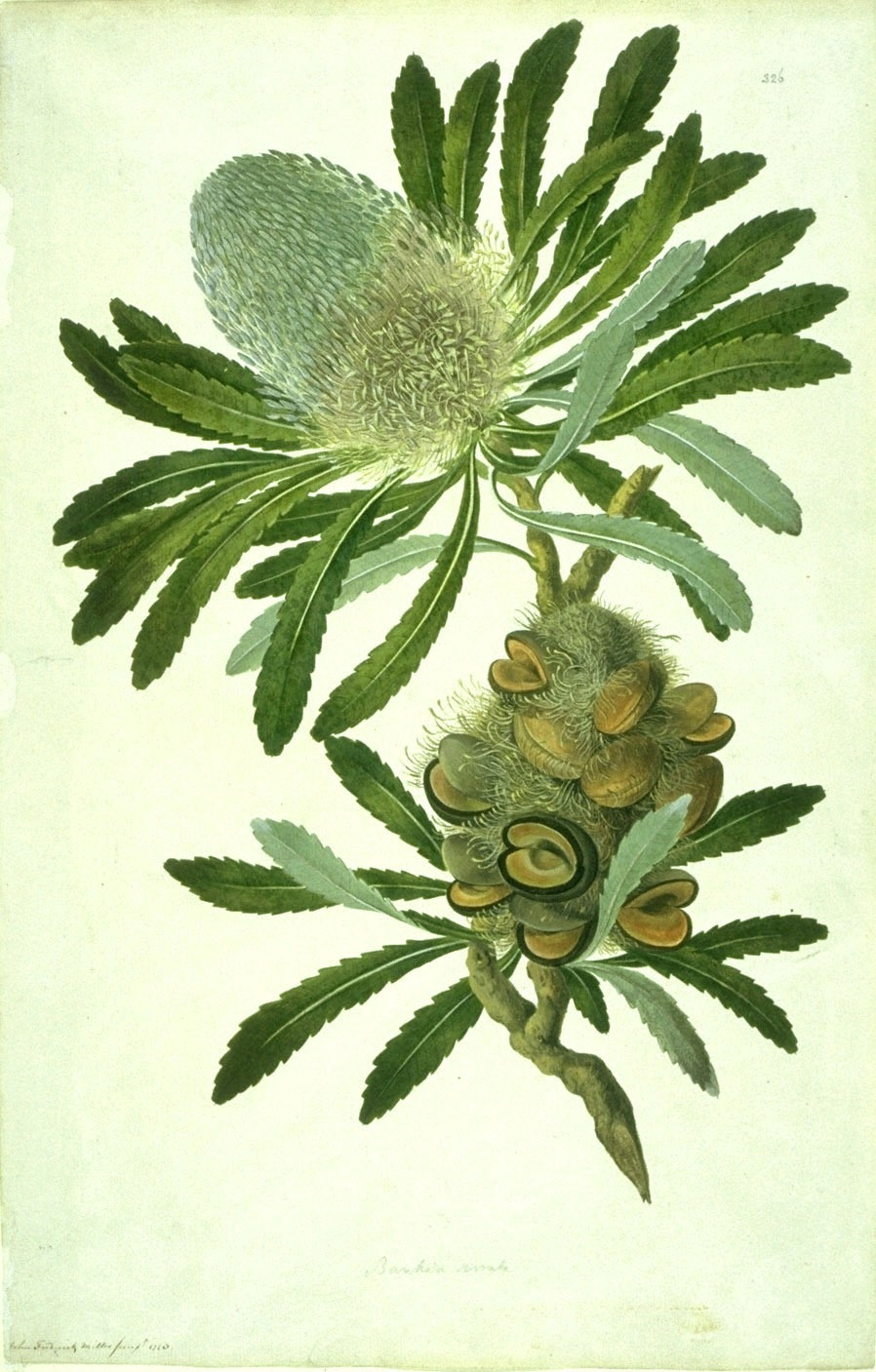
A 1770s watercolour of Banksia serrata, the type species of Banksia. One of the first drawings of a Banksia species, it was produced by one of Sir Joseph Banks' London artists, based on original drawings by Sydney Parkinson, who was present when the genus was first collected at Botany Bay.

As with other flowering plants, the taxonomy of Banksia has traditionally been based on anatomical and morphological properties of the Banksia flower, fruiting structure and seed, along with secondary characteristics such as leaf structure and growth habit. Increasingly, molecular evidence from DNA is providing important new insights into relationships within the genus and between this and other genera in the Proteaceae.

The genus is placed in family Proteaceae, subfamily Grevilleoideae, tribe Banksieae and subtribe Banksiinae. The most recent complete revision is that published in Alex George's 1999 monograph for the Flora of Australia book series; this recognises two subgenera, three sections, 13 series, 77 species, 6 subspecies and 18 varieties, and treats the traditionally related genus Dryandra as separate but closely related. Recent molecular cladistic analyses have provided an alternative view in which Dryandra is shown to be nested inside, and hence should be included within, Banksia. This interpretation has been controversial in some circles, and is not universally accepted.

== Background ==
Banksia (in the traditional sense, not including Dryandra), is a genus of around 80 species in the plant family Proteaceae. An iconic Australian wildflower and popular garden plant, they are easily recognised by their characteristic flower spikes and fruiting "cones". They grow in forms varying from prostrate woody shrubs to trees up to 35 metres tall, and occur in all but the most arid areas of Australia. As heavy producers of nectar, they are important sources of food for nectariferous animals such as honeyeaters and honey possums, and they are of economic importance to the nursery and cut flower industries. However they are threatened by a number of processes, including land clearing, frequent burning, and disease; and a number of species are rare and endangered.

== Taxonomic history ==
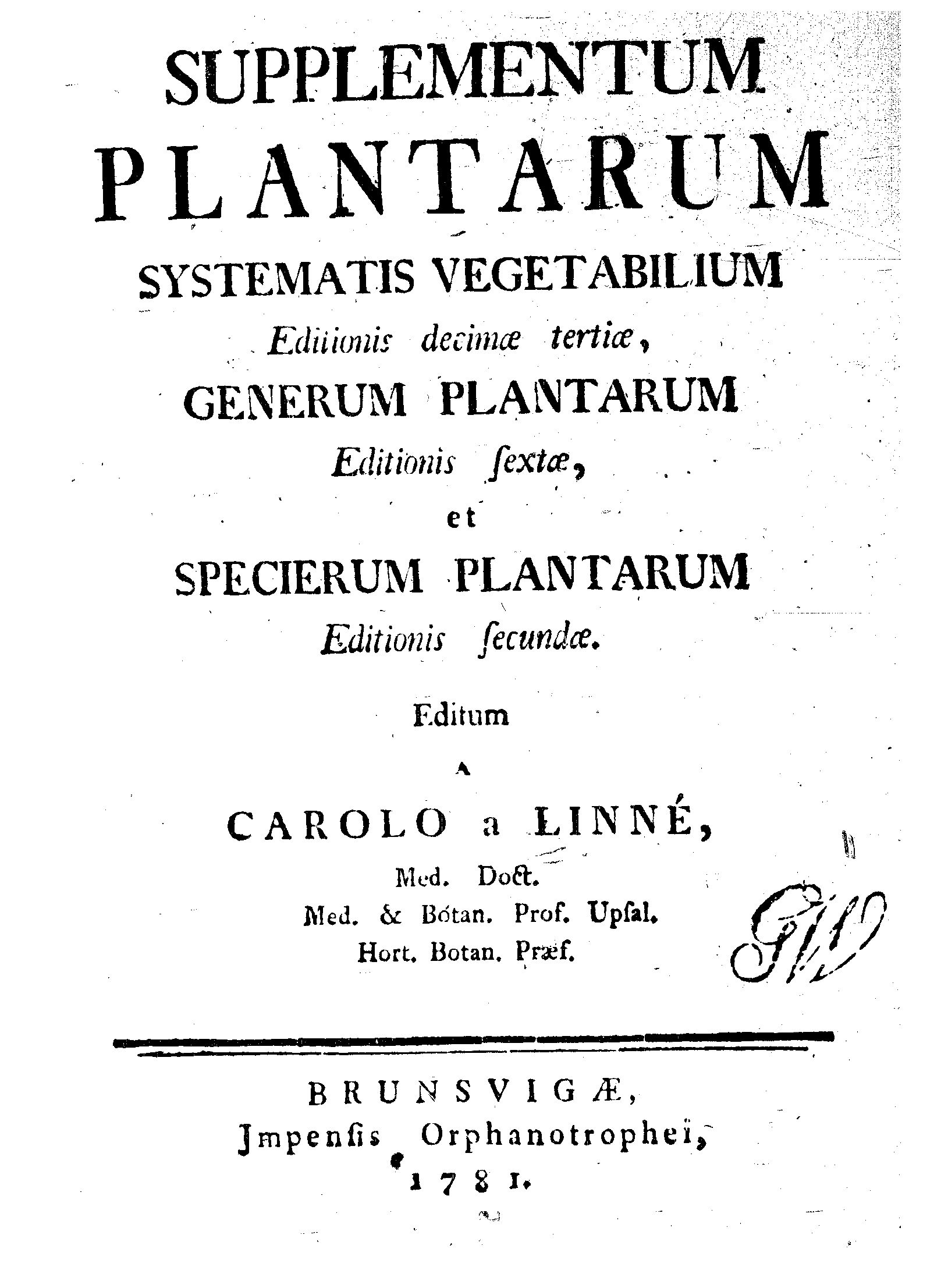
Banksia was first described in Carolus Linnaeus the Younger's April 1782 publication Supplementum Plantarum.

Specimens of Banksia were first collected by Sir Joseph Banks and Dr Daniel Solander, naturalists on the Endeavour during Lieutenant (later Captain) James Cook's first voyage to the Pacific Ocean. Cook landed on Australian soil for the first time on 29 April 1770, at a place that he later named Botany Bay in recognition of "the great quantity of plants Mr Banks and Dr Solander found in this place". Over the next seven weeks, Banks and Solander collected thousands of plant specimens, including the first specimens of a new genus that would later be named Banksia in Banks' honour. Four species were present in this first collection: B. serrata (saw banksia), B. integrifolia (coast banksia), B. ericifolia (heath-leaved banksia) and B. robur (swamp banksia). In June the ship was careened at Endeavour River, where specimens of B. dentata (tropical banksia) were collected.

Every specimen collected during the Endeavour voyage was sketched by Banks' botanical illustrator Sydney Parkinson. On the Endeavour's return to England in July 1771, Banks' specimens became part of his London herbarium, and artists were employed to paint watercolours from Parkinson's sketches. Banks had plans to publish his entire collection as "Banks' Florilegium", but for various reasons the project was never completed, and it would be ten years before any of the Banksia species were formally published. By this time, a sixth species had been collected; in 1776, during Cook's third voyage, David Nelson collected specimens of B. marginata (silver banksia) from South Bruny Island, Tasmania.

The genus Banksia was finally described and named by Carolus Linnaeus the Younger in his April 1782 publication Supplementum Plantarum; hence the full name for the genus is "Banksia L.f.". Linnaeus placed the genus in class Tetrandra, order Monogynia of his father's classification, and named it in honour of Banks. The name Banksia had in fact already been published in 1775 as Banksia J.R.Forst & G.Forst, referring to some New Zealand species that the Forsters had collected during Cook's second voyage. However Linnaeus incorrectly attributed the Forsters' specimens to the genus Passerina, and therefore considered the name Banksia available for use. By the time Joseph Gaertner corrected Banks' error in 1788, Banksia L.f. was widely known and accepted, so Gaertner renamed Banksia J.R.Forst & G.Forst to Pimelea, a name previously chosen for the genus by Banks and Solander.

Banksia L.f. has since been challenged a number of times. The later near-homonym Banksea Koenig was published in 1783, but subsequently determined to be a synonym of Costus L. In 1790 James Bruce published Bankesia Bruce, later corrected to Banksia Bruce, but the name was rejected in favour of Johann Friedrich Gmelin's name Hagenia. In 1820 the name Banksia Dombey ex DC. was published, but this was later determined by be a nomen nudum that referred to the genus Cuphea, In 1891, Otto Kuntze proposed to enforce the right of precedent of Banksia J.R.Forst & G.Forst, renaming Pimelea to Banksia, and proposing the name Sirmuellera Kuntze in place of Banksia L.f. This challenge failed, as did James Britten's 1905 challenge. In 1940, Banksia L.f. was formally conserved against Banksia J.R.Forst. & G.Forst by Thomas Sprague.

In 1810, Robert Brown published descriptions and a taxonomic arrangement of the 31 known species of Banksia in his Prodromus Florae Novae Hollandiae et Insulae Van Diemen. He placed B. ilicifolia alone in subgenus Isostylis, in recognition of its unusual dome-shaped inflorescence. All other species were placed in subgenus Banksia verae, the "True Banksias". Brown made no attempt to classify the species below the subgenus level. He described another eleven Banksia species in his 1830 supplement, placing them all in Banksia verae in accordance with his 1810 classification. Banksia verae was renamed Eubanksia by Stephan Endlicher in 1847.

By the time Carl Meissner published his 1856 classification of the Proteaceae, there were 58 described Banksia species. Meissner's arrangement gave Isostylis and Eubanksia sectional rank, and divided the latter into four series based on leaf properties; these series were all highly heterogeneous.

George Bentham published his arrangement of the Banksia in his landmark 1870 publication Flora Australiensis. The number of recognised Banksia species was reduced to 46, and Meissner's four heterogeneous series were replaced by four sections based on leaf, style and pollen-presenter characters, taking the number of sections to five. Three of these sections were fairly well-defined and homogeneous, while another, Orthostylis, was somewhat heterogeneous. The fourth, Cyrtostylis, was erected to contain the species that did not belong in the other sections, and was therefore highly heterogeneous. Despite these shortcomings, this arrangement would stand for over 100 years.

== Classification and relationships within Proteaceae ==
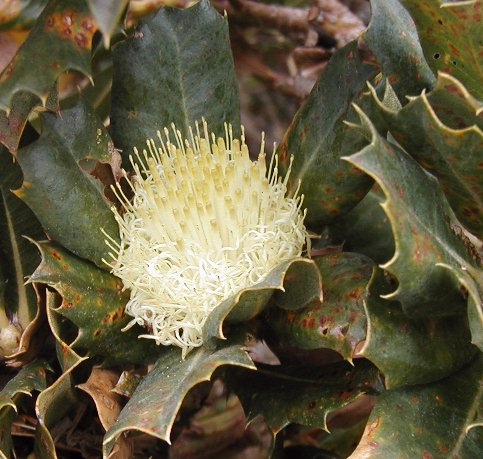
The former genus Dryandra was mereged into the Banksia in 2007. (Banksia ser. dryandra sessilis pictured).

The framework for classification of genera within Proteaceae was laid by L. A. S. Johnson and Barbara Briggs in their influential 1975 monograph "On the Proteaceae: the evolution and classification of a southern family". Their arrangement has been refined somewhat over the ensuing three decades, most notably by Peter H. Weston and Nigel Barker in 2006. Proteaceae is divided into five subfamilies, with Banksia placed in subfamily Grevilleoideae because the individual flowers in its inflorescence occur in pairs. On the basis of certain characters of the leaf venation, hairs and pollen, it is grouped with three other genera in the tribe Banksieae. Two small genera, Austromuellera and Musgravea, both of which occur only in the rainforests of Queensland, are placed in subtribe Musgraveinae. Banksia is placed subtribe Banksiinae on a number of grounds of which the most obvious and easily recognised is the occurrence of flowers in condensed heads. The placement of Banksia in Proteaceae can be summarised as follows:

Family Proteaceae

Subfamily Bellendenoideae
Subfamily Persoonioideae
Subfamily Symphionematoideae
Subfamily Proteoideae
Subfamily Grevilleoideae

Tribe Roupalae
Tribe Banksieae

Subtribe Musgraveinae
Subtribe Banksiinae

Genus Banksia

Tribe Embothrieae
Tribe Macadamieae

Although the taxonomic legitimacy of tribe Banksiinae is universally recognised, there has been some debate about the legitimacy of the tribe's resolution into genera Banksia and Dryandra. For a number of years this debate centred on similarities between the inflorescences of Banksia subg. Isostylis species and those of Dryandra. These similarities led to calls for the genera to be merged, or for Isostylis to be moved across to Dryandra. However, Alex George and other supporters of the status quo argued that the similarities between Isostylis and Dryandra were matters of superficial appearance, whereas similarities between Isostylis and other Banksia species were far more important diagnostically. Recent DNA analyses led by Austin Mast have confirmed George's position that Dryandra and Isostylis are not especially closely related, but have also provided powerful evidence that Banksia is paraphyletic with respect to Dryandra (that is, Dryandra is a sub-group of Banksia. Mast suggested that the least disruptive approach to restore monophyly would be to sink Dryandra into Banksia. This has been put into effect in a 2007 paper by Mast & Thiele, in which all existing species of Dryandra were transferred into Banksia.

== Classical taxonomic treatment ==
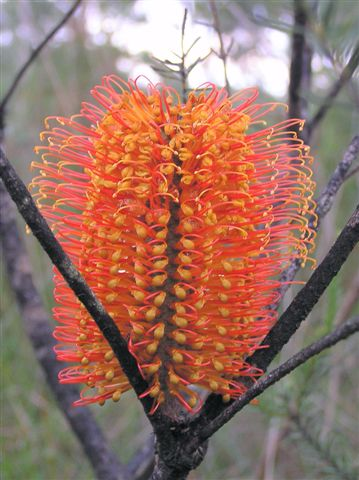
B. ericifolia is placed in section Oncostylis on the basis of its hooked styles, which can be seen clearly here.

In 1981, Alex George published his classic 1981 monograph The Genus Banksia L.f. (Proteaceae). George's arrangement was based on a variety of properties including leaf, style, pollen-presenter, follicle and seed characters, with the criterion that a taxon was considered a distinct species only if it exhibited a "significant and consistent difference in the morphology of flowers and/or fruit". It was the first thorough revision of the taxonomy of Banksia for over a century, and formed the basis for George's 1984 The Banksia Book, which remains the standard text on the genus, and the treatment of Banksia in the Flora of Australia series.

George followed Brown in dividing Banksia into two subgenera, Banksia and Isostylis. He then divided subgenus Banksia into two sections: Banksia for species with straight or slightly curved styles, and Oncostylis for species with hooked styles. These two sections were then divided into nine and three series respectively. The arrangement into series largely followed Bentham, with series Orthostylis remaining somewhat heterogeneous, and Cyrtostylis remaining highly heterogeneous.

This conventional taxonomic arrangement of Banksia, as provided by George and published in the Flora of Australia series, may be summarised as follows:

Genus Banksia

Subgenus Banksia

Section Banksia

Series Salicinae

Subseries Acclives

B. dentata – B. plagiocarpa – B. oblongifolia – B. robur

Subseries Integrifoliae

B. aquilonia – B. integrifolia – B. conferta – B. paludosa – B. marginata – B. canei – B. saxicola

Series Grandes

B. grandis – B. solandri

Series Banksia

Subseries Banksia

B. serrata – B. aemula – B. ornata

Subseries Cratistylis

B. baxteri – B. speciosa – B. menziesii – B. candolleana – B. sceptrum

Series Crocinae

B. prionotes – B. burdettii – B. hookeriana – B. victoriae

Series Prostratae

B. goodii – B. gardneri – B. chamaephyton – B. blechnifolia – B. repens – B. petiolaris

Series Cyrtostylis

B. media – B. praemorsa – B. epica – B. pilostylis – B. attenuata – B. ashbyi – B. benthamiana – B. audax – B. lullfitzii – B. elderiana – B. laevigata – B. elegans – B. lindleyana

Series Tetragonae

B. lemanniana – B. caleyi – B. aculeata

Series Bauerinae

B. baueri

Series Quercinae

B. quercifolia – B. oreophila

Section Coccinea

B. coccinea

Section Oncostylis

Series Spicigerae

Subseries Spinulosae

B. spinulosa

Subseries Ericifoliae

B. ericifolia

Subseries Occidentales

B. verticillata – B. seminuda – B. littoralis – B. occidentalis – B. brownii

Series Tricuspidae

B. tricuspis

Series Dryandroidae

B. dryandroides

Series Abietinae

Subseries Nutantes

B. nutans

Subseries Sphaerocarpae

B. sphaerocarpa – B. micrantha – B. grossa

Subseries Leptophyllae

B. telmatiaea – B. leptophylla – B. lanata – B. scabrella

Subseries Longistyles

B. violacea – B. incana – B. laricina – B. pulchella – B. meisneri

Subgenus Isostylis

B. ilicifolia – B. oligantha – B. cuneata

== Cladistic analyses ==
=== Thiele and Ladiges ===
In 1996, Kevin Thiele and Pauline Ladiges published a cladistic analysis of the genus Banksia in the journal Australian Systematic Botany. As their cladogram differed substantially from the current taxonomic arrangement, they published a revised arrangement that accorded better with their results. Four varieties were promoted to species rank: B. conferta var. penicillata to B. penicillata (now B. conferta subsp. penicillata); B. gardneri var. brevidentata to B. brevidentata; B. gardneri var. hiemalis to B. hiemalis; and B. sphaerocarpa var. dolichostyla to B. dolichostyla. Two new series and eleven subseries were introduced; Banksia sect. Oncostylis and Banksia ser. Crocinae were discarded; and Banksia ser. Cyrtostylis was largely redefined. Six species were left incertae sedis.

Most aspects of Thiele and Ladiges' arrangement were not accepted by George in his 1999 revision. He stated that "the infrageneric classification and systematic sequence presented here are modified from that of George (1981) and take into account new data revealed in the work of Thiele & Ladiges (1996)", but none of the four promotions to species rank was accepted, and none of the thirteen infrageneric taxa introduced by Thiele and Ladiges was retained. However, a number of Australian herbaria have continued to follow Thiele and Ladiges on some points, for example by recognising the four species that they promoted.

=== DNA analysis ===
Following on from an earlier molecular study, Austin Mast and co-authors published cladistic analyses of genetic data from DNA samples of almost all species of Banksia, along with five Dryandra species, in 2002 and 2005. Their results indicated the presence of two large clades of Banksia, which they named "/Cryptostomata" ("hidden stomates") and "/Phanerostomata" ("visible stomates").

The /Phanerostomata were defined as those taxa in which the leaf stomata occur superficially or in shallow pits. These taxa are typically tall shrubs and trees that occur in moist areas; they have unbeaked follicles and soft, short-lived leaves that are in many cases needle-like. The clade includes all eastern taxa of the series Salicinae and Spicigerae (that is, all taxa except B. serrata, B. aemula and B. ornata) and also the western Spicigerae, Quercinae, Grandes, Abietinae and Dryandroideae.

The /Cryptostomata were defined as those taxa in which the leaf stomata occur in crypts with constricted entrances. These are usually small shrubs that occur on dry, infertile sandplains. They have beaked follicles and thick, tough, long-lived serrated leaves. It includes all other western taxa, plus the eastern species B. serrata, B. aemula and B. ornata, and also appears to include Dryandra. It is worth noting that Dryandra does not appear especially closely related to the Isostylis group, which is instead most closely related to B. elegans and then B. attenuata.

Thus, the results presented by Mast et al. strongly suggest that Banksia is paraphyletic with respect to Dryandra. Although they did not propose a new taxonomic arrangement, they did consider various options for adjusting the current accepted arrangement to remove the paraphyly. They conclude that the simplest and least disruptive solution would be to merge Dryandra into Banksia. This solution was put into effect in a subsequent paper by Mast & Thiele.

The change has been adopted by a number of Australian herbaria including the Western Australian Herbarium, now headed by Thiele (this has the largest holdings of specimens), and by the Australian Plant Census, a project of the Council of Heads of Australasian Herbaria. This is in accordance with majority current taxonomic practice, in which only holophyletic groups are named as taxa, and groups found to be paraphyletic (e.g. Banksia not including Dryandra) are adjusted to achieve a holophyletic naming system. Alex George maintains a firm position against the change, arguing variously that the phylogenetic analyses are flawed and that paraphyly does not necessitate taxonomic changes.

== See also ==
- Cultivated plant taxonomy
- List of Banksia species
