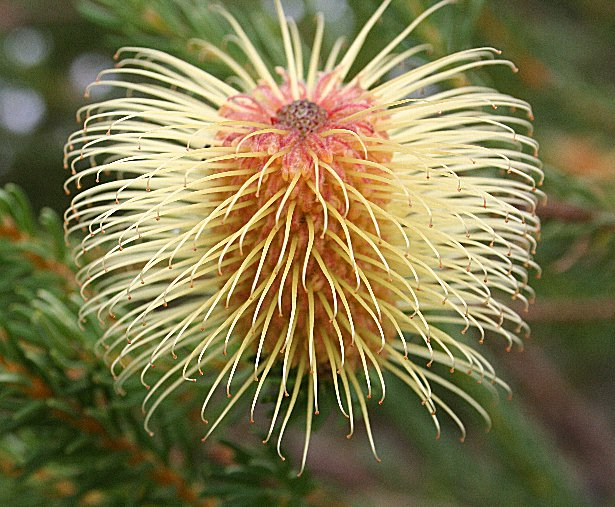
- B. pulchella (teasel banksia), a species in B. ser. Abietinae

Scientific classification
- Kingdom: Plantae
- Clade: Tracheophytes
- Clade: Angiosperms
- Clade: Eudicots
- Order: Proteales
- Family: Proteaceae
- Genus: Banksia
- Subgenus: Banksia subg. Banksia
- Section: Banksia sect. Oncostylis
- Series: Banksia ser. Abietinae; Meisn.

= Banksia ser. Abietinae =

Series of plants found in Australia

Banksia ser. Abietinae is a valid botanic name for a series of Banksia. First published by Carl Meissner in 1856, the name has had three circumscriptions.

== According to Meissner ==
B. ser. Abietinae was first published in 1856, in Carl Meissner's chapter on the Proteaceae in A. P. de Candolle's Prodromus systematis naturalis regni vegetabilis. It was one of four series into which the subgenus Eubanksia was divided. These four series were defined in terms of leaf characters, with series Abietinae containing the species with entire or shortly denticulate leaves with revolute margins. In hindsight, it was the most homogeneous of the four series, as it contained only (but not all) species with hooked styles. The other three series were highly heterogeneous in comparison. The placement and circumscription of B. ser. Abietinae in Meissner's arrangement may be summarised as follows:

Banksia

B. sect. Eubanksia

B. ser. Abietinæ

B. pulchella
B. Meisneri
B. sphærocarpa

B. sphaerocarpa var. glabrescens (now B. incana)

B. pinifolia (now B. leptophylla)
B. nutans
B. ericifolia
B. spinulosa
B. tricuspis

B. ser. Salicinæ (23 species, 8 varieties)
B. ser. Quercinæ (18 species, 2 varieties)
B. ser. Dryandroideæ (8 species)

B. sect. Isostylis (1 species)

Meissner's arrangement was current until 1870, when George Bentham published his arrangement, discarding all four of Meissner's series.

== According to George ==
In 1981, Alex George published a thorough revision of Banksia in his classic monograph The genus Banksia L.f. (Proteaceae). He reinstated B. ser. Abietinae, placing it within B. sect. Oncostylis, and defining it as containing only those species with entire, linear leaves with revolute margins, and having roughly spherical inflorescences. Thus three species with elongate cylindrical inflorescences were moved into separate series.

The placement and circumscription of B. ser. Abietinae in George's taxonomic arrangement of Banksia may be summarised as follows:

Banksia

B. subg. Banksia

B. sect. Banksia (9 series, 50 species, 9 subspecies, 3 varieties)
B. sect. Coccinea (1 species)
B. sect. Oncostylis

B. ser. Spicigerae (7 species, 2 subspecies, 4 varieties)
B. ser. Tricuspidae (1 species)
B. ser. Dryandroideae (1 species)
B. ser. Abietinae

B. sphaerocarpa

B. s. var. sphaerocarpa
B. s. var. caesia
B. s. var. dolichostyla

B. micrantha
B. grossa
B. telmatiaea
B. leptophylla

B. l. var. leptophylla
B. l. var. melletica

B. lanata
B. scabrella
B. violacea
B. incana
B. laricina
B. pulchella
B. meisneri

B. m. subsp. meisneri
B. m. subsp. ascendens

B. nutans

B. n. var. nutans
B. n. var. cernuella

B. subg. Isostylis (3 species)

== According to Thiele and Ladiges ==
In 1996, Kevin Thiele and Pauline Ladiges undertook a cladistic analysis of morphological characters of Banksia, which yielded a phylogeny somewhat at odds with George's taxonomic arrangement. Their cladogram included a clade consisting of the members of B. ser. Abietinae sensu George, and also B. tricuspis (Lesueur banksia):

- - - B. nutans var. nutans
    - B. nutans var. cernuella
  - - B. violacea
    - - - B. laricina
        - - B. incana
          - B. tricuspis
      - - B. pulchella
        - - B. meisneri var. meisneri
          - B. meisneri var. ascendens
- - - B. grossa
    - - B. dolichostyla (now B. sphaerocarpa var. dolichostyla)
      - - B. micrantha
        - - B. sphaerocarpa var. sphaerocarpa
          - B. sphaerocarpa var. caesia
  - - B. telmatiaea
    - - B. scabrella
      - - B. leptophylla var. melletica
        - - B. leptophylla var. leptophylla
          - B. lanata

Thiele and Ladiges therefore retained George's B. ser. Abietinae largely intact, but transferred Banksia tricuspis (Lesueur banksia) back into it. They then further divided it into four subseries, in accordance with the resolution of clades in their analysis. The placement and circumscription of B. ser. Abietinae in Thiele and Ladiges' arrangement may be summarised as follows:

Banksia

B. subg. Isostylis (3 species)
B. elegans (incertae sedis)
B. subg. Banksia

B. ser. Tetragonae (4 species)
B. ser. Lindleyanae (1 species)
B. ser. Banksia (2 subseries, 12 species)
B. baueri (incertae sedis)
B. lullfitzii (incertae sedis)
B. attenuata (incertae sedis)
B. ashbyi (incertae sedis)
B. coccinea (incertae sedis)
B. ser. Prostratae (8 species)
B. ser. Cyrtostylis (4 species)
B. ser. Ochraceae (3 species, 2 subspecies)
B. ser. Grandes (2 species)
B. ser. Salicinae (2 subseries, 11 species, 4 subspecies)
B. ser. Spicigerae (3 subseries, 7 species, 6 varieties)
B. ser. Quercinae (2 species)
B. ser. Dryandroideae (1 species)
Banksia ser. Abietinae

Banksia subser. Nutantes

B. nutans

B. n. var. nutans
B. n. var. cernuella

Banksia subser. Sphaerocarpae

B. grossa
B. dolichostyla (now B. sphaerocarpa var. dolichostyla)
B. micrantha
B. sphaerocarpa

B. s. var. sphaerocarpa
B. s. var. caesia

Banksia subser. Leptophyllae

B. telmatiaea
B. scabrella
B. leptophylla

B. l. var. melletica
B. l. var. leptophylla

B. lanata

Banksia subser. Longistyles

B. violacea
B. laricina
B. incana
B. tricuspis
B. pulchella
B. meisneri

B. m. var. meisneri
B. m. var. ascendens

Thiele and Ladiges' arrangement remained current only until 1999, when George's treatment of the genus for the Flora of Australia series of monographs was published. This was essentially a revision of George's 1981 arrangement, which took into account some of Thiele and Ladiges' data, but rejected their overall arrangement. With respect to B. ser. Abietinae, George's 1999 arrangement differed from his 1981 arrangement only in the ordering of the species.

== Recent developments ==
Since 1998, Austin Mast has been publishing results of ongoing cladistic analyses of DNA sequence data for the subtribe Banksiinae. His analyses suggest a phylogeny that is very greatly different from George's taxonomic arrangement, including finding Banksia to be paraphyletic with respect to Dryandra. Early in 2007 Mast and Thiele initiated a rearrangement of Banksia by transferring Dryandra into it, and publishing B. subg. Spathulatae for the species having spoon-shaped cotyledons. Abietinae all fall within Mast and Thiele's B. subg. Spathulatae, and for the most part fall close together. However B. nutans (nodding banksia) appears to be rather less closely related to the other species in series Abietinae than are Banksia dryandroides (dryandra-leaved banksia) and the members of B. ser. Grandes. Mast and Thiele have foreshadowed publishing a full arrangement once DNA sampling of Dryandra is complete.
