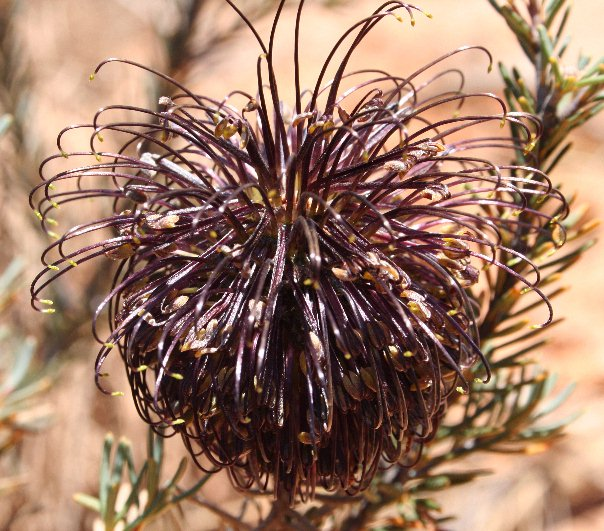
- Inflorescence of Banksia violacea

Scientific classification
- Kingdom: Plantae
- Clade: Tracheophytes
- Clade: Angiosperms
- Clade: Eudicots
- Order: Proteales
- Family: Proteaceae
- Genus: Banksia
- Species: B. violacea

Binomial name
- Banksia violacea C.A.Gardner

= Banksia violacea =

Violet banksia

Species of plant

Banksia violacea, commonly known as violet banksia, is a species of shrub or tree in the plant genus Banksia (family Proteaceae). It generally grows as a small shrub to 1.5 m (5 ft) high with fine narrow leaves, and is best known for its unusually coloured dark purple-violet inflorescences. The colour of the inflorescences, short leaves, and flattened follicles which are sticky when young, help identify this species from others in the field. It is found in low shrubland in southern regions of Western Australia from Esperance in the east to Narrogin in the west, growing exclusively in sandy soils.

First described in 1927 by the West Australian botanist Charles Gardner, the species was at one stage considered a variety of B. sphaerocarpa. Although there are no recognised subspecies or varieties, both lignotuberous and nonlignotuberous forms exist for Banksia violacea. Wasps, ants and flies have been recorded visiting flower spikes. Banksia violacea is classified as Not Threatened under the Wildlife Conservation Act of Western Australia. Regarded as of little value to floriculture, it is rarely cultivated.

== Description ==
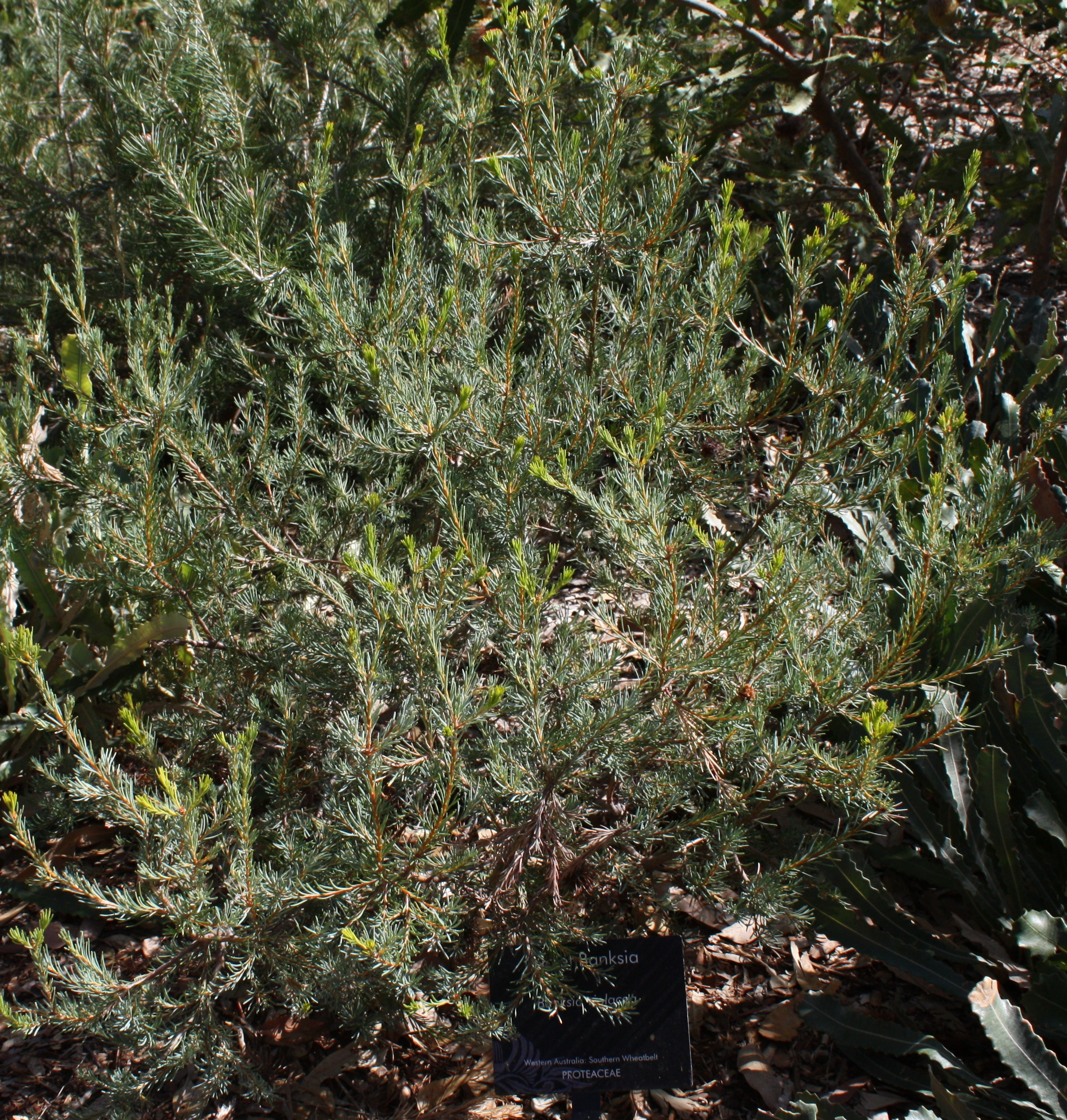
Typical shrubby habit

Banksia violacea grows as a shrub up to 1.5 m (5 ft) tall, with narrow leaves 1–2 cm (0.4–0.8 in) long and about 0.15 cm (0.06 in) wide. New growth occurs in summer, and flowering ranges from November to April with a peak in February, but can be irregular in timing. Flowers arise from typical Banksia "flower spikes", and the inflorescences are made up of hundreds of pairs of flowers densely packed in a spiral around a woody axis. Roughly spherical with a diameter of 2–3 cm (0.8–1.2 in), the flower spikes arise from lateral stems lie partly within the foliage. Unusually for Banksia species, the inflorescences are often violet in colour, ranging anywhere from a dark violet-black through various combinations of violet and greenish-yellow in less pigmented blooms. Each flower consists of a tubular perianth made up of four fused tepals, and one long wiry style. The styles are hooked rather than straight, and are initially trapped inside the upper perianth parts, but break free at anthesis. The old flowers gradually fade to brown. The fruiting structure or follicle is a stout woody "cone", with a hairy appearance caused by the persistence of old withered flower parts. These follicles are crowded around the globular spike (called an infructescence at this point) and are oval to rhomboid, although the crowding makes some irregularly shaped. They measure 1–2.5 cm (0.4–1 in) long, 0.6 cm (0.2 in) high and 0.8–2.2 cm (0.3–0.9 in) wide. They are quite flattened and lack a ridge along the valve line. When young, the follicles are greenish in colour and slightly sticky, and covered in fine white hairs, fading to tan or grey with age. They open with fire, releasing a winged wedge-shaped (cuneate) seed 2–2.5 cm (0.8–1 in) long. The mottled dark grey seed body is falcate (crescent-shaped) and measures 1.2–1.8 cm (0.5–0.7 in) long and 0.2–0.25 cm (0.1 in) wide, with a flattened dark brown wing 1.1–1.7 cm (0.4–0.5 in) wide. The woody separator has the same dimensions as the seed.

The bright green cotyledon leaves of the seedlings are oblong to linear in shape and measure 1.5 cm (0.6 in) long by 0.3 cm (0.1 in) wide. The greenish red hypocotyl is hairy, as are the stems of young plants. The hairy seedling leaves are crowded and oppositely arranged. They measure 0.7–1.3 cm (0.2–0.5 in) in length and have recurved margins. Young plants often begin branching within their first year of life.

== Taxonomy ==
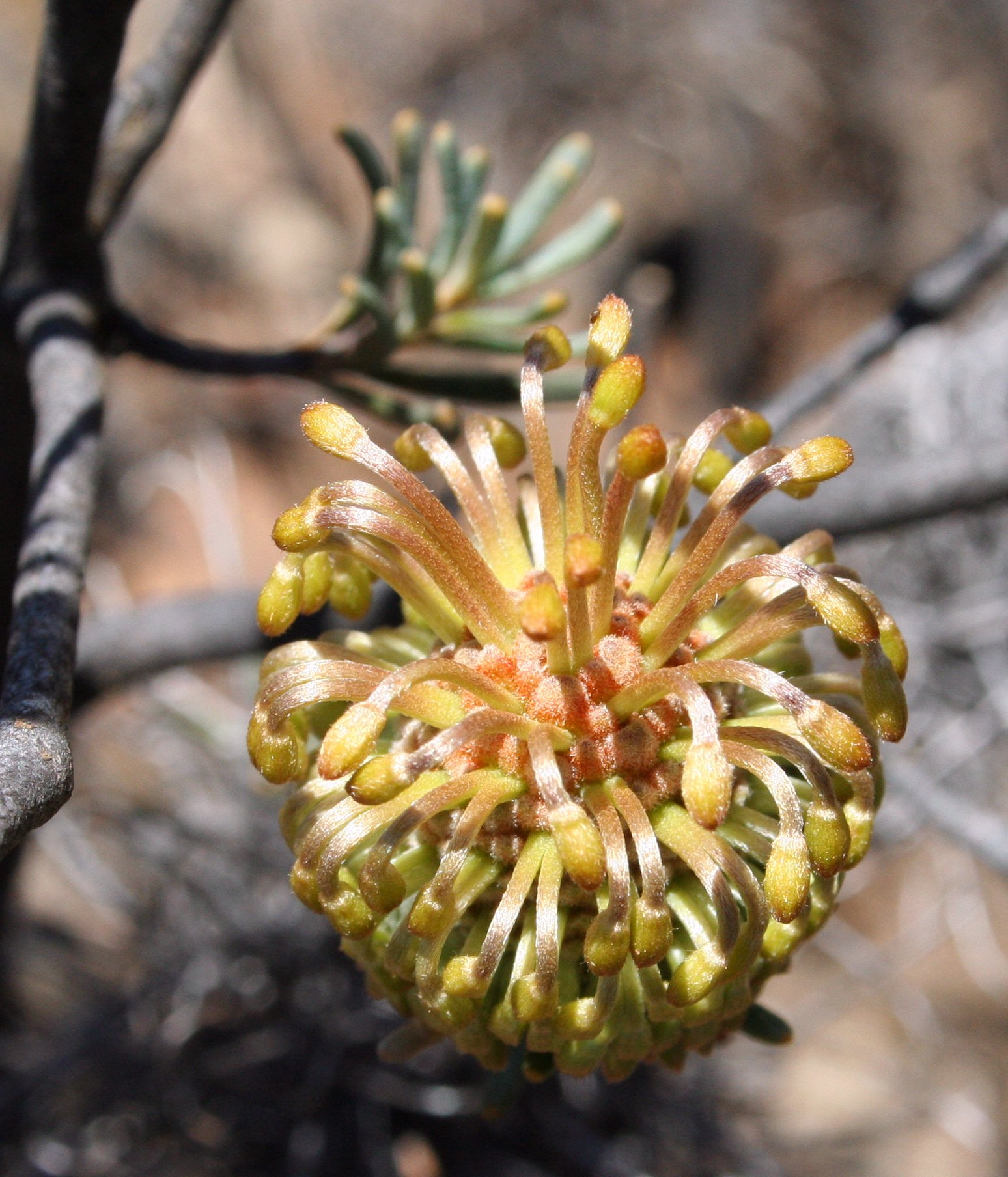
Inflorescence in early bud

The type specimen of Banksia violacea was collected by the West Australian botanist Charles Gardner on 14 December 1926 in the vicinity of Lake Grace. The following year, he published a description of the species in Journal and Proceedings of the Royal Society of Western Australia. He placed it in section Oncostylis of Bentham's taxonomic arrangement of Banksia, giving it the specific epithet violacea in reference to the violet flowers. Thus the full name of the species, with author citation, is Banksia violacea C.A.Gardner. The species has been considered a variety of B. sphaerocarpa (Fox Banksia); this view was published by William Blackall in his 1954 How to know Western Australian wildflowers. He considered B. violacea to be a variety of B. sphaerocarpa with violet flowers. This description was an invalid publication, however, and a nomen nudum. In 1981 Alex George declared Banksia sphaerocarpa var. violacea Blackall a nomenclatural synonym of B. violacea.

In George's 1981 arrangement, B. violacea was placed in subgenus Banksia because its inflorescence is a typical Banksia "flower spike"; section Oncostylis because of its hooked styles; and series Abietinae because its inflorescence is roughly spherical. It was placed in taxonomic sequence between B. incana (Hoary Banksia) and B. meisneri (Meissner's Banksia).

In 1996, Kevin Thiele and Pauline Ladiges published the results of a cladistic analysis of morphological characters of Banksia. They retained George's subgenera and many of his series, but discarded his sections. B. ser. Abietinae was found to be very nearly monophyletic and so it was retained. It further resolved into four subclades, so Thiele and Ladiges split it into four subseries. B. violacea appeared in the last of these:

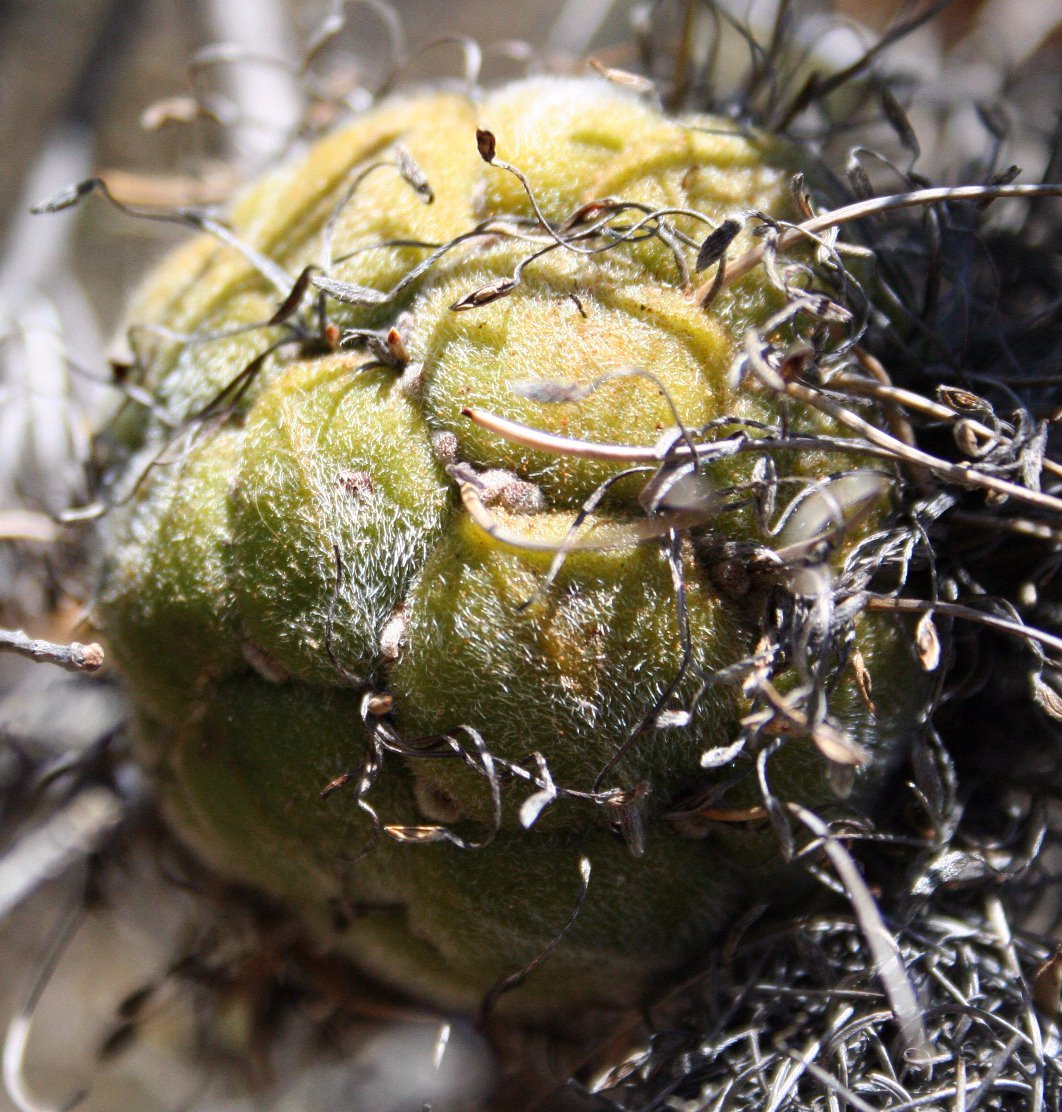
Young follicles are green, and slightly sticky at this stage.

- B. violacea
- - - B. laricina
    - - B. incana
      - B. tricuspis
  - - B. pulchella
    - - B. meisneri var. meisneri
      - B. meisneri var. ascendens

This clade became the basis of B. subseries Longistyles, which Thiele defined as containing those taxa with very long and slender styles, smoothly convex perianth limbs without a costal ridge, and thickened margins. In accordance with their cladogram, their arrangement placed B. violacea first in taxonomic sequence, followed by B. laricina (Rose-fruited Banksia). However, Thiele and Ladiges' arrangement was not accepted by George, who, questioning the emphasis on cladistics, rejected most of their changes in his 1999 arrangement, restored B. series Abietinae to his broader 1981 definition, and abandoned all of Thiele and Ladiges' subseries. George commented that the species has no close relatives, being "loosely allied" to B. sphaerocarpa (Fox Banksia) and B. telmatiaea (Swamp Fox Banksia). Despite this, the sequence of the series was altered so that B. violacea fell between B. scabrella (Burma Road Banksia) and B. incana, and its placement in George's arrangement may be summarised as follows:

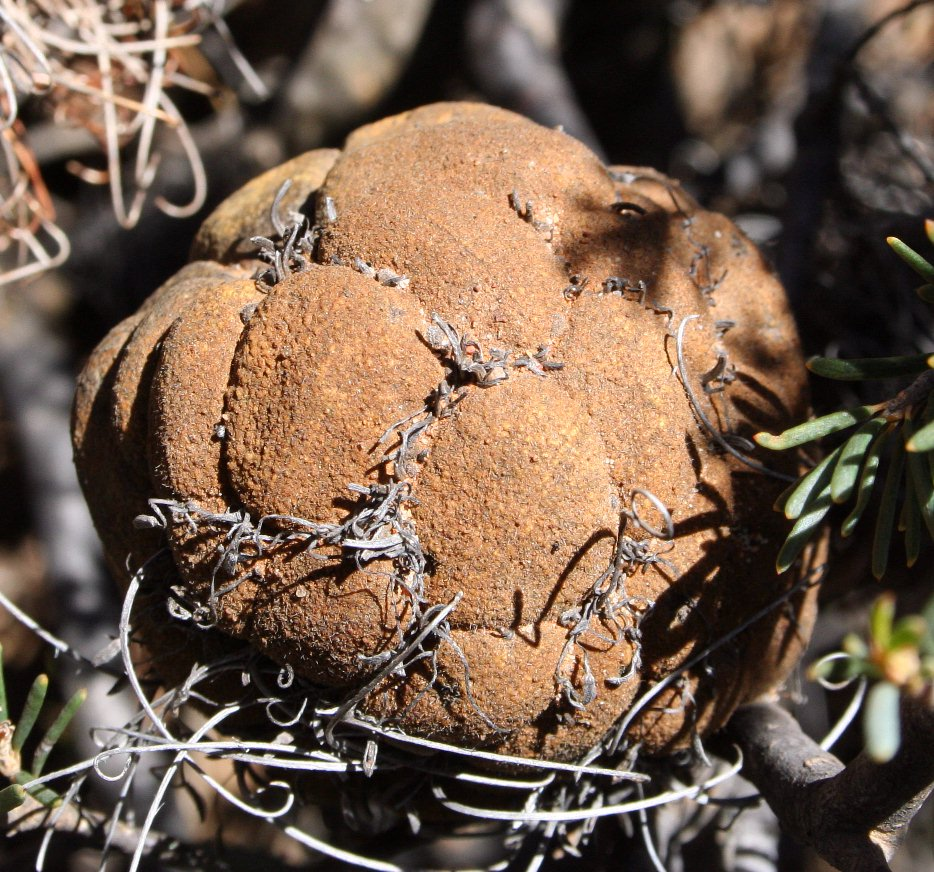
Older follicles

Banksia

B. subg. Banksia

B. sect. Banksia (9 series, 50 species, 9 subspecies, 3 varieties)
B. sect. Coccinea (1 species)
B. sect. Oncostylis

B. ser. Spicigerae (7 species, 2 subspecies, 4 varieties)
B. ser. Tricuspidae (1 species)
B. ser. Dryandroideae (1 species)
B. ser. Abietinae

B. sphaerocarpa (3 varieties)
B. micrantha
B. grossa
B. telmatiaea
B. leptophylla (2 varieties)
B. lanata
B. scabrella
B. violacea
B. incana
B. laricina
B. pulchella
B. meisneri (2 subspecies)
B. nutans (2 varieties)

B. subg. Isostylis (3 species)

Since 1998, an American botanist, Austin Mast, has been publishing results of ongoing cladistic analyses of DNA sequence data for the subtribe Banksiinae. His analyses suggest a phylogeny that is very greatly different from George's arrangement, and somewhat different from Thiele and Ladiges'. With respect to B. violacea, Mast's results agree with its placement near B. laricina and B. incana, placing it in a clade with these two species and B. sphaerocarpa var. dolichostyla (treated at species rank as B. dolichostyla). However, Thiele's B. subseries Longistyles appears to be polyphyletic, as do both definitions of B. ser. Abietinae—that is, none form a natural grouping.

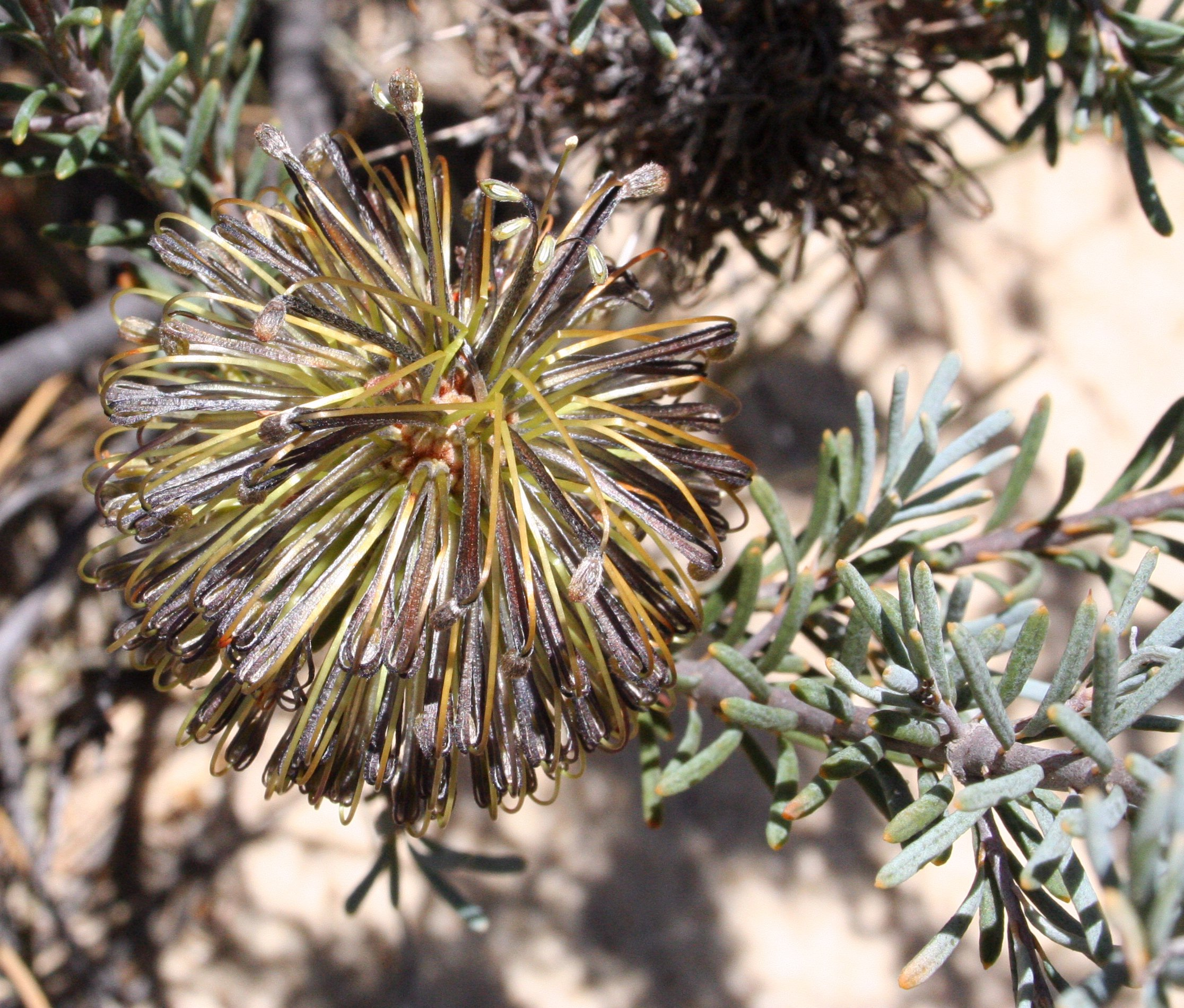
Paler inflorescence and leaves

- B. dolichostyla
- B. violacea
- - B. laricina
  - B. incana

Early in 2007, Mast and Thiele initiated a rearrangement of Banksia by merging Dryandra into it, and publishing B. subgenus Spathulatae for the taxa having spoon-shaped cotyledons. They foreshadowed publishing a full arrangement once DNA sampling of Dryandra was complete; in the meantime, if Mast and Thiele's nomenclatural changes are taken as an interim arrangement, then B. violacea is placed in B. subgenus Spathulatae.

== Distribution and habitat ==
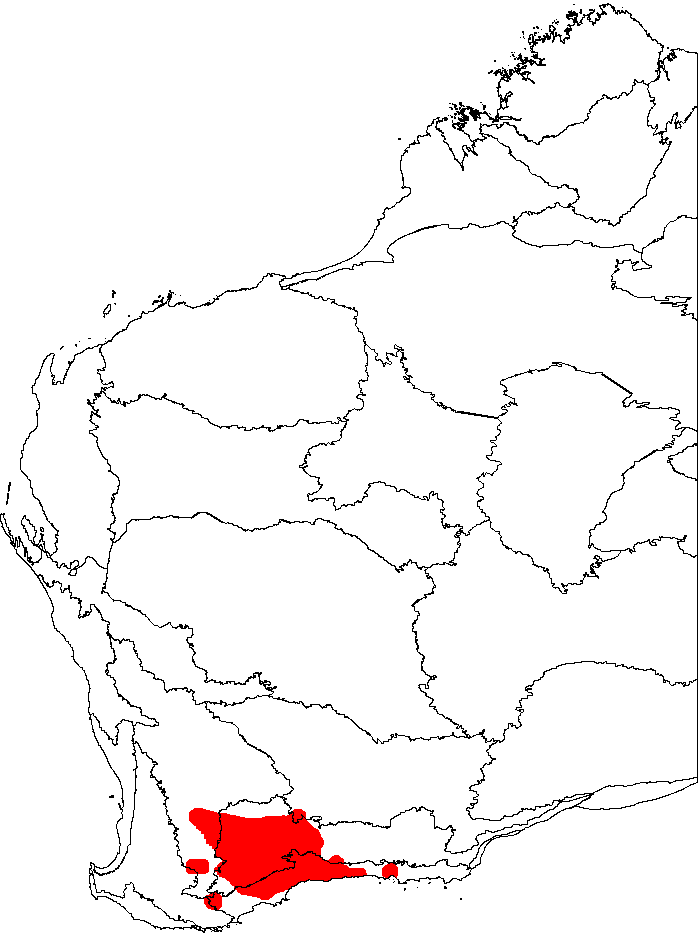
Distribution of B. violacea, shown on a map of Western Australia's biogeographic regions.

B. violacea occurs in southern regions of Western Australia, from Woodanilling to Esperance and as far north as Hyden. This distribution includes areas of the Avon Wheatbelt, Esperance Plains and Mallee biogeographic regions. It favours white sandy soils, often overlying laterite, clay or quartzite. It usually grows among heath and shrublands, associated with mallee eucalypts and Banksia sphaerocarpa var. caesia. Banksia violacea is classified as Not Threatened under the 1950 Wildlife Conservation Act of Western Australia.

== Ecology ==
Like most other Proteaceae, Banksia violacea has proteoid roots, roots with dense clusters of short lateral rootlets that form a mat in the soil just below the leaf litter. These enhance solubilisation of nutrients, thus allowing their uptake in low-nutrient soils such as the phosphorus-deficient soils of Australia. B. violacea is highly susceptible to Phytophthora cinnamomi dieback.

Banksia violacea is one of a small number of Banksia species that has both lignotuberous and non-lignotuberous populations. In both cases, plants are adapted to release their aerial seed bank following a bushfire, ensuring seedlings are established on clear and relatively fertile ground; however the possession of a lignotuber makes plants much less reliant on fire regime for population maintenance and regeneration, as maternal plants are not killed by bushfire, but resprout from below ground level. Lignotuberous plants generally occur among the north-eastern populations, in the vicinity of Woodanilling. An investigation into the biogeography of these plants failed to find any vegetative, climatic or other environmental factors associated with the possession of a lignotuber.

Banksia flowerheads in general play host to a variety of birds, mammals and insects. However, only wasps, ants and flies were recorded visiting flower spikes during observations for The Banksia Atlas in the mid-1980s.

== Cultivation ==
Banksia violacea is rarely cultivated. It is a slow-growing plant that tends to become untidy with age, and generally does not flower until four to five years after sprouting from seed. Flowers are an unusual colour, but occur within the bush where they grow within and are usually obscured by foliage. It tolerates light pruning not below the green foliage, except for the variant with a lignotuber, which may be pruned heavily. George recommends a sunny position in light, sandy soil. Professor Margaret Bernard Sedgley of the Waite Institute suggests the species is of no value to floriculture, as the inflorescences are too small and obscured by the foliage, although she does add that the purple colour may be a worthwhile character to select for in plant breeding. Seeds do not require any treatment, and take 19 to 50 days to germinate.

== See also ==
- Data related to Banksia violacea at Wikispecies
