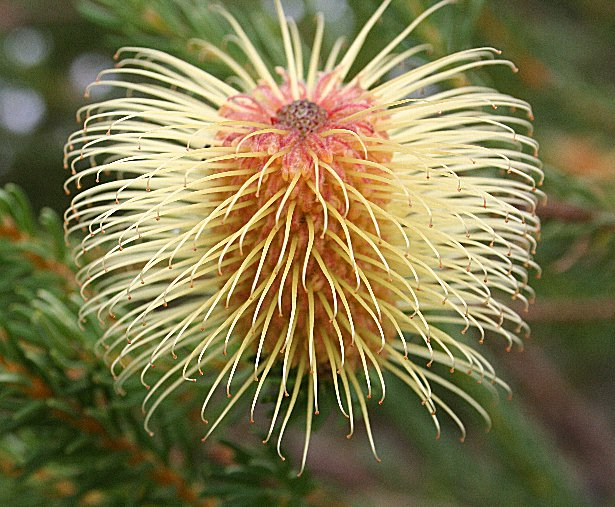
- Banksia pulchella (teasel banksia), the type species of B. subser. Longistyles

Scientific classification
- Kingdom: Plantae
- Clade: Tracheophytes
- Clade: Angiosperms
- Clade: Eudicots
- Order: Proteales
- Family: Proteaceae
- Genus: Banksia
- Subgenus: Banksia subg. Banksia
- Section: Banksia sect. Oncostylis
- Series: Banksia ser. Abietinae
- Subseries: Banksia subser. Longistyles; K.R.Thiele

= Banksia subser. Longistyles =

Subseries of Australian plants

Banksia subser. Longistyles is a valid botanic name for a subseries of Banksia. It was published by Kevin Thiele in 1996, but discarded by Alex George in 1999.

== Cladistics ==
The name came about after a cladistic analysis of Banksia by Thiele and Pauline Ladiges yielded a phylogeny somewhat at odds with the accepted taxonomic arrangement, prompting them to publish a revised arrangement. Their cladogram contained clade a consisting of B. tricuspis (Lesueur banksia) and all of the taxa in George's B. ser. Abietinae, implying that George's B. ser. Abietinae could be rendered monophyletic by transferring B. tricuspis into it. This clade resolved into four subclades, for which Thiele published four corresponding subseries. B. subser. Longistyles was based upon the second subclade:

- B. violacea
- - - B. laricina
    - - B. incana
      - B. tricuspis
  - - B. pulchella
    - - B. meisneri var. meisneri
      - B. meisneri var. ascendens

== Taxonomy ==
B. subser. Longistyles was formally defined as containing those taxa with very long and slender styles, and with smoothly convex perianth limbs without a costal ridge and with thickened margins. The epithet Longistyles is from the Latin longus ("long") and stylus (style).

Although the nearest outgroup of B. subser. Longistyles was the clade corresponding to B. subser. Nutantes, the subseries was placed after all the other subseries in Thiele and Ladiges' taxonomic arrangement. The placement and circumscription of B. subser. Longistyles may be summarised as follows:

Banksia

B. subg. Isostylis (3 species)
B. elegans (incertae sedis)
B. subg. Banksia

B. ser. Tetragonae (4 species)
B. ser. Lindleyanae (1 species)
B. ser. Banksia (2 subseries, 12 species)
B. baueri (incertae sedis)
B. lullfitzii (incertae sedis)
B. attenuata (incertae sedis)
B. ashbyi (incertae sedis)
B. coccinea (incertae sedis)
B. ser. Prostratae (8 species)
B. ser. Cyrtostylis (4 species)
B. ser. Ochraceae (3 species, 2 subspecies)
B. ser. Grandes (2 species)
B. ser. Salicinae (2 subseries, 11 species, 4 subspecies)
B. ser. Spicigerae (3 subseries, 7 species, 6 varieties)
B. ser. Quercinae (2 species)
B. ser. Dryandroideae (1 species)
B. ser. Abietinae

B. subser. Nutantes (1 species, 2 varieties)
B. subser. Sphaerocarpae (4 species, 2 varieties)
B. subser. Leptophyllae (4 species, 2 varieties)
Banksia subser. Longistyles

B. violacea
B. laricina
B. incana
B. tricuspis
B. pulchella
B. meisneri

B. m. var. meisneri
B. m. var. ascendens

Thiele and Ladiges' arrangement remained current only until 1999, when George's treatment of the genus for the Flora of Australia series of monographs was published. This was essentially a revision of George's 1981 arrangement, which took into account some of Thiele and Ladiges' data, but rejected their overall arrangement. B. subser. Longistyles was discarded, and B. tricuspis once again removed from B. ser. Abietinae.

== Recent developments ==
Since 1998, Austin Mast has been publishing results of ongoing cladistic analyses of DNA sequence data for the subtribe Banksiinae. His analyses suggest a phylogeny that is rather different from previous taxonomic arrangements. Although B. ser. Abietinae is largely monophyletic, B. subser. Longistyles apparently is not, as its members fall into three widely separated clades.

Early in 2007 Mast and Thiele initiated a rearrangement of Banksia by transferring Dryandra into it, and publishing B. subg. Spathulatae for the species having spoon-shaped cotyledons. All members of subseries Longistyles with within Mast and Thiele's B. subg. Spathulatae, but nothing further has been published. Mast and Thiele have foreshadowed publishing a full arrangement once DNA sampling of Dryandra is complete.
