= Banksia meisneri subsp. meisneri =

Scientific classification
- Kingdom: Plantae
- Clade: Tracheophytes
- Clade: Angiosperms
- Clade: Eudicots
- Order: Proteales
- Family: Proteaceae
- Genus: Banksia
- Species: B. meisneri Lehm.
- Subspecies: B. m. subsp. meisneri

Trinomial name
- Banksia meisneri subsp. meisneri

Shrub subspecies

Banksia meisneri subsp. meisneri is a subspecies of Banksia meisneri. It is native to the Southwest Botanical Province of Western Australia. As an autonym, it is defined as containing the type specimen of the species.
