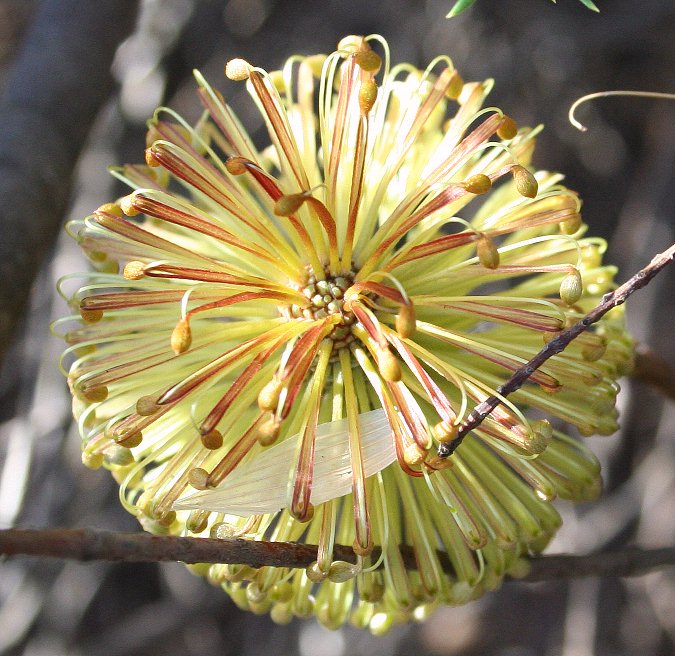
- Banksia laricina in Moore River National Park

Scientific classification
- Kingdom: Plantae
- Clade: Tracheophytes
- Clade: Angiosperms
- Clade: Eudicots
- Order: Proteales
- Family: Proteaceae
- Genus: Banksia
- Species: B. laricina

Binomial name
- Banksia laricina C.A.Gardner

= Banksia laricina =

Rose banksia

Species of shrub endemic to Western Australia

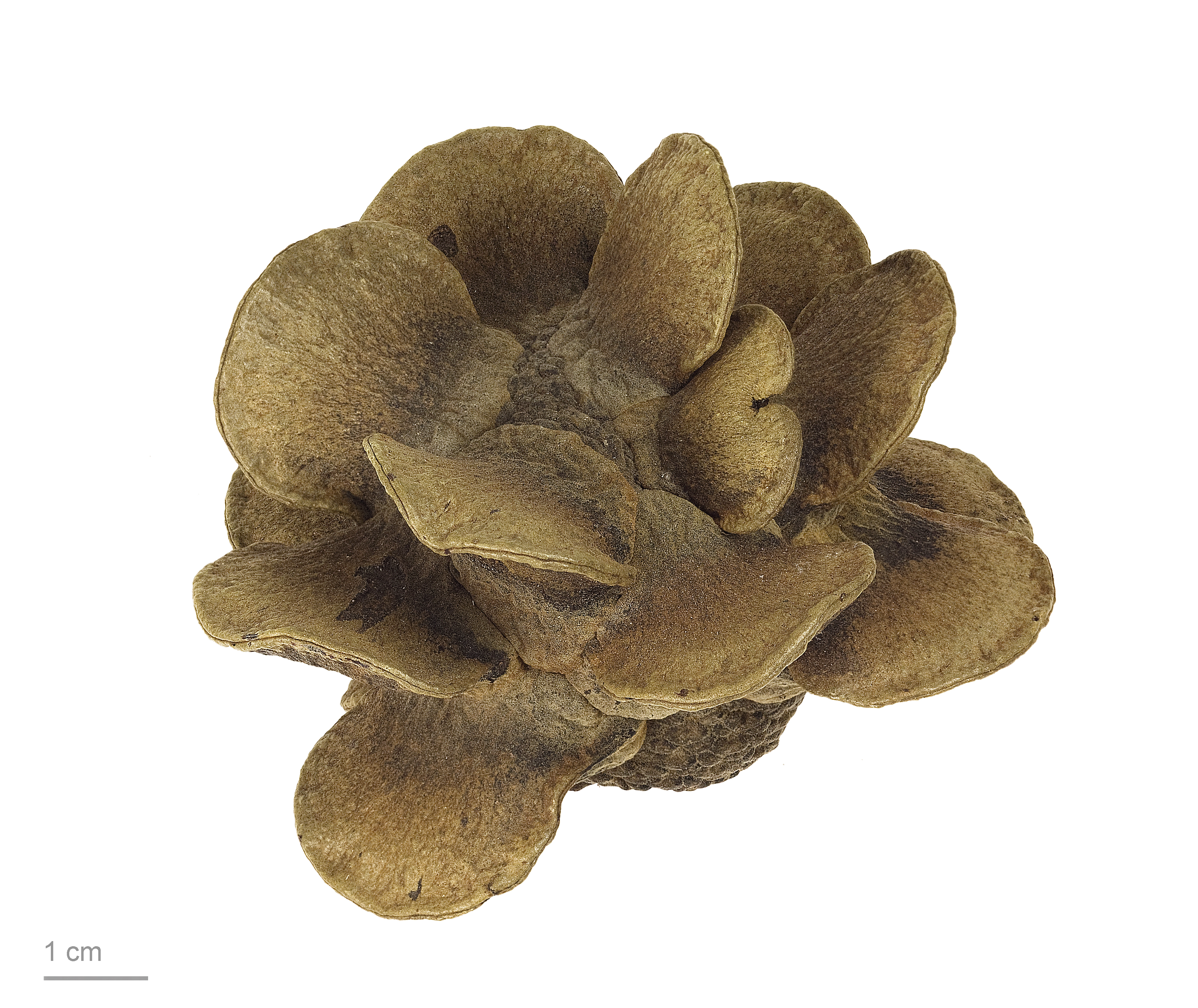
Banksia laricina - MHNT

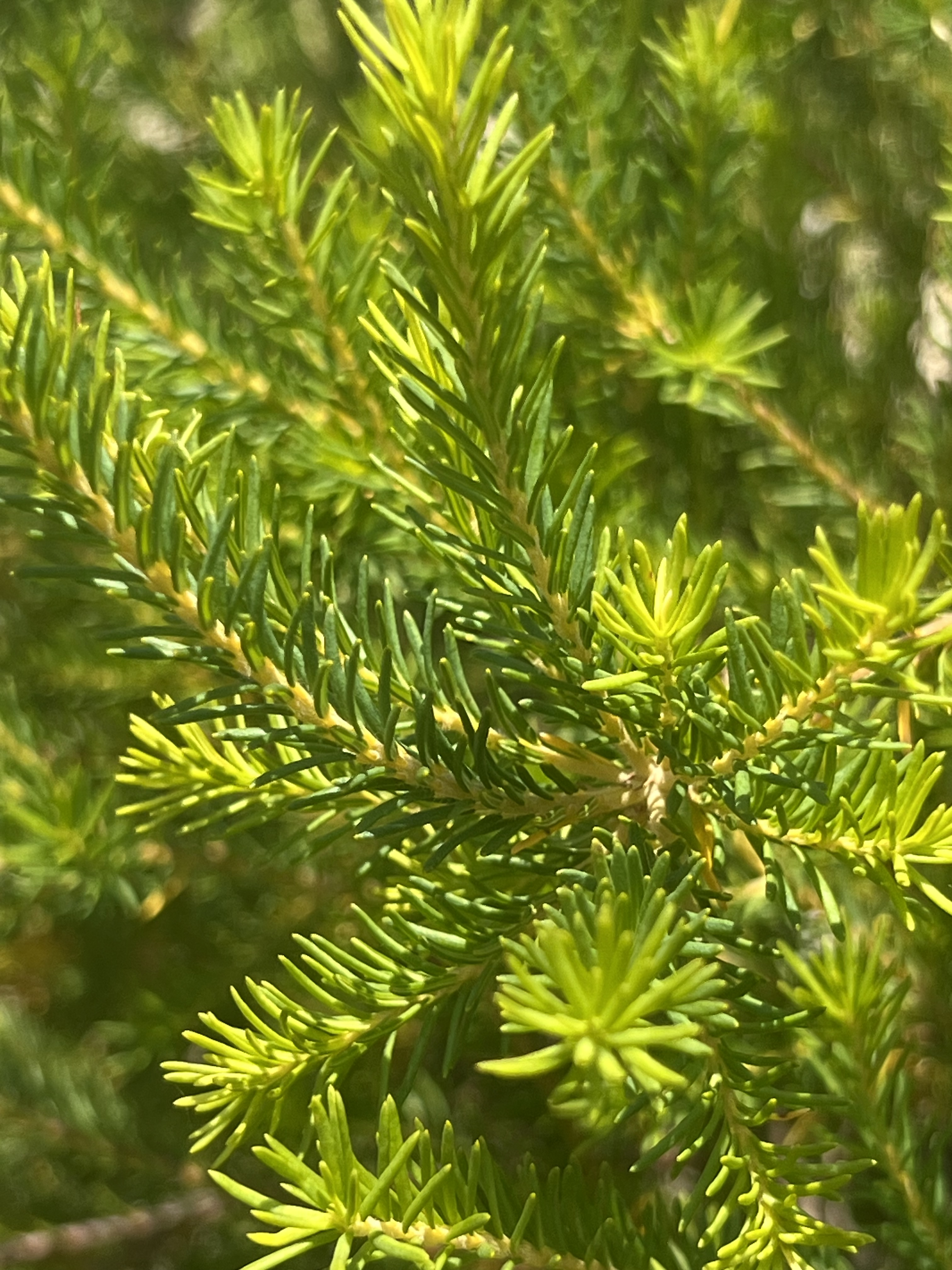
Foliage

Banksia laricina, commonly known as the rose banksia, is a species of shrub that is endemic to southwestern Western Australia. It has crowded, linear leaves with a short point on the tip, golden brown flowers with a bright yellow style and prominent egg-shaped follicles.

== Description ==
Banksia laricina is a shrub that typically grows to a height of 1.7 m (5 ft 7 in) but that does not form a lignotuber. The leaves are narrow linear and crowded, 5–15 mm (0.20–0.59 in) long and less than 1 mm (0.039 in) wide on a petiole 1–1.5 mm (0.039–0.059 in) long, with a sharp point on the tip. The flowers are arranged in a head 15–25 mm (0.59–0.98 in) long with small involucral bracts at the base. The flowers are pale yellow with a yellow style, the perianth 17–19 mm (0.67–0.75 in) long and the pistil hooked and 27–30 mm (1.1–1.2 in) long. Flowering occurs from April to July and the follicles are prominent, 22–30 mm (0.87–1.18 in) long, 19–27 mm (0.75–1.06 in) high and 14–18 mm (0.55–0.71 in) wide, the old flowers falling from the head.

== Taxonomy ==
Banksia laricina was first formally described in 1964 by West Australian botanist Charles Gardner in the Journal of the Royal Society of Western Australia from specimens he collected in July 1958. The specific epithet (laricina) is derived from Latin, meaning larch-like.

In 1981, George placed this species in the series Abietinae. Cladistic analysis in a 1996 paper by Kevin Thiele and Pauline Ladiges suggested that the closest relatives of B. laricina appeared to be B. incana and B. tricuspis. In their taxonomic arrangement, Thiele and Ladiges placed B. laricina in series Abietinae, subseries Longistyles.

Thiele and Ladiges' arrangement was not accepted by George, and was largely discarded by him in his 1999 arrangement in Flora of Australia.

== Distribution and habitat ==
Rose banksia is restricted to a small area near the Moore River and Regans Ford where it grows in low woodland.

== Conservation status ==
Banksia laricina is classified as "not threatened" by the Western Australian Government Department of Parks and Wildlife.

== Use in horticulture ==
Rarely cultivated, Banksia laricina will grow on sandy well drained soils in a sunny position. It may require extra water during summer dry periods and take some time (up to 18 months) to establish well. Seeds do not require any treatment, and take 19 to 51 days to germinate.
