= Banksia nutans var. nutans =

Scientific classification
- Kingdom: Plantae
- Clade: Tracheophytes
- Clade: Angiosperms
- Clade: Eudicots
- Order: Proteales
- Family: Proteaceae
- Genus: Banksia
- Species: B. nutans R.Br.
- Variety: B. n. var. nutans

Trinomial name
- Banksia nutans var. nutans

Variety of plant native to Australia

Banksia nutans var. nutans is a variety of the plant Banksia nutans. It is native to the Southwest Botanical Province of Western Australia. As an autonym, its name is defined as containing the type specimen of the species.
