= Banksia nutans var. cernuella =

Scientific classification
- Kingdom: Plantae
- Clade: Tracheophytes
- Clade: Angiosperms
- Clade: Eudicots
- Order: Proteales
- Family: Proteaceae
- Genus: Banksia
- Species: B. nutans
- Variety: B. n. var. cernuella

Trinomial name
- Banksia nutans var. cernuella A.S.George

Variety of plant native to Australia

Banksia nutans var. cernuella is a variety of Banksia nutans. It is native to the Southwest Botanical Province of Western Australia. Seeds do not require any treatment, and take around 17 days to germinate.
