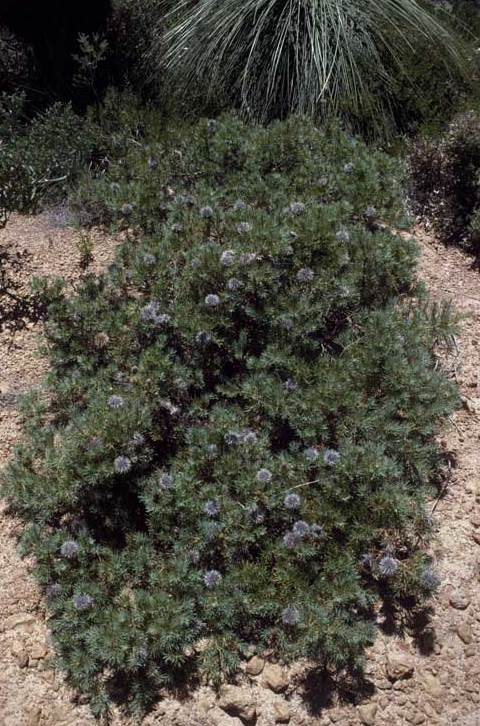
- Habit near Lesueur National Park

Scientific classification
- Kingdom: Plantae
- Clade: Tracheophytes
- Clade: Angiosperms
- Clade: Eudicots
- Order: Proteales
- Family: Proteaceae
- Genus: Banksia
- Species: B. micrantha

Binomial name
- Banksia micrantha A.S.George

= Banksia micrantha =

Species of shrub endemic to Western Australia

Banksia micrantha is a species of small shrub that is endemic to the south-west of Western Australia. It is a spreading bush with sharply-pointed linear leaves, pale yellow flower spikes and up to twenty-five follicles surrounded by the remains of the flowers. It was first formally described by Alex George in 1981.

== Description ==
Banksia micrantha grows as a spreading, bushy shrub up to 60 cm (24 in) high and 120 cm (47 in) wide and forms a lignotuber. Its branches are often horizontal and underground at first. It has hairy stems and sharply-pointed, linear leaves 10–30 mm (0.39–1.18 in) long and 1–1.4 mm (0.039–0.055 in) wide on a petiole 1.5–2 mm (0.059–0.079 in) long. The edges of the leaves are tightly rolled under. The flowers are pale yellow and arranged in a spike 15–30 mm (0.59–1.18 in) long with hairy involucral bracts 2.5–4 mm (0.098–0.157 in) long at the base of the head. The perianth is 17–20 mm (0.67–0.79 in) long and the pistil hooked and 19–23 mm (0.75–0.91 in) long. Up to twenty-five egg-shaped to elliptic follicles 23–27 mm (0.91–1.06 in) long 7–15 mm (0.28–0.59 in) high and 20–23 mm (0.79–0.91 in) wide form in each head, surrounded by the remains of the flowers.

== Taxonomy ==
Banksia micrantha had been recorded since 1938, but considered part of a broad B. sphaerocarpa complex, until officially described in 1981 by Alex George in his monograph The genus Banksia L.f. (Proteaceae). The specific epithet (micrantha) is from ancient Greek words meaning "small" and "flower".

George placed B. micrantha in Banksia subgenus Banksia because of its characteristic Banksia flower spike, section Oncostylis because its flowers have hooked styles, and series Abietinae because of its roughly spherical flower spike. Its closest relative is said to B. sphaerocarpa (fox banksia).

A 1996 cladistic analysis of Banksia by Kevin Thiele and Pauline Ladiges confirmed B. micrantha's placement in series Abietinae alongside B. sphaerocarpa, finding B. micrantha to be more closely related to B. sphaerocarpa var. sphaerocarpa and B. sphaerocarpa var. caesia than is B. sphaerocarpa var. dolichostyla. As a result, this last variety was upgraded to species rank as B. dolichostyla, and the four taxa were placed with B. grossa in a new subseries of Abietinae, Banksia subser. Sphaerocarpae. However, these changes were not accepted by Alex George in his authoritative 1999 contribution to the Flora of Australia series.

== Distribution and habitat ==
Banksia micrantha grows in kwongan and occurs amongst heath on sand or sand over laterite on the gentle slopes of lateritic hills between Eneabba and Cervantes.

== Ecology ==
This banksia is fire tolerant, resprouting from its lignotuber but the follicles also remain closed until after a bushfire, when the follicles open to release the seed.

== Conservation status ==
Banksia micrantha is classified as "not threatened" by the Western Australian Government Department of Parks and Wildlife.

== Use in horticulture ==
Seeds do not require any treatment, and take 19 to 21 days to germinate.
