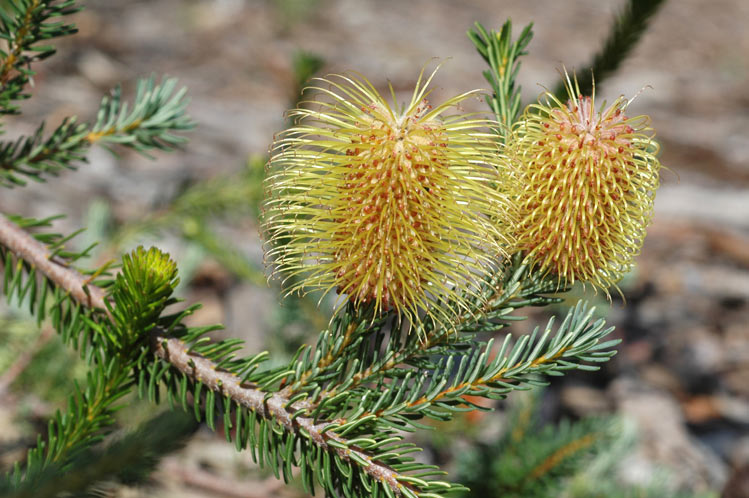
- Banksia pulchella, in Kings Park

Scientific classification
- Kingdom: Plantae
- Clade: Tracheophytes
- Clade: Angiosperms
- Clade: Eudicots
- Order: Proteales
- Family: Proteaceae
- Genus: Banksia
- Species: B. pulchella

Binomial name
- Banksia pulchella R.Br.

Synonyms
- Sirmuellera pulchella (R.Br.) Kuntze

= Banksia pulchella =

Teasel banksia

Species of shrub endemic to Western Australia

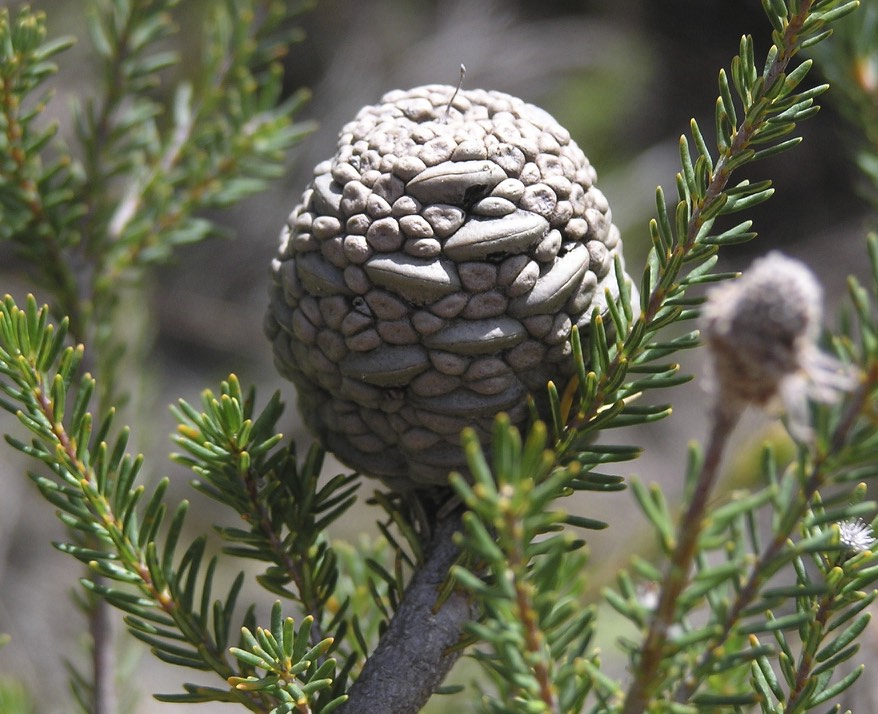
Fruit

Banksia pulchella, commonly known as teasel banksia, is a species of small shrub that is endemic to the south-west of Western Australia. It has smooth grey bark, linear leaves and golden-brown flowers in short, cylindrical heads and inconspicuous follicles.

== Description ==
Banksia pulchella is a shrub that typically grows to a height of 1 m (3 ft 3 in) and has smooth grey bark but does not form a lignotuber. The leaves are narrow linear, 5–15 mm (0.20–0.59 in) long and about 0.8 mm (0.031 in) wide on a petiole 1–1.5 mm (0.039–0.059 in) long. The leaves have a sharp point on the tip. The flowers are golden-brown with bright yellow styles and are arranged in short cylindrical heads 20–25 mm (0.79–0.98 in) long and 35–50 mm (1.4–2.0 in) wide at flowering. There are small involucral bracts at the base of the head but that fall off as the flowers develop. The perianth is 17–19 mm (0.67–0.75 in) long and the pistil 27–30 mm (1.1–1.2 in) long and hooked. Flowering occurs in January, March or May to October. The follicles are 8–17 mm (0.31–0.67 in) long, up to 3 mm (0.12 in) high and 7 mm (0.28 in) wide and inconspicuous, although the old flowers fall from the head.

== Taxonomy and naming ==
Banksia pulchella was first formally described by Robert Brown who published the description in Transactions of the Linnean Society of London. Brown's specimens were collected at locations along the south coast of Western Australia, but in 1981, Alex George chose the specimens that Brown collected at Lucky Bay as the lectotype. The specific epithet (pulchella) is from the Latin pulchellus meaning "pretty", probably referring to the flowers.

George placed B. oreophila in subgenus Banksia, section Oncostylis, series Abietinae.

== Distribution and habitat ==
Teasel banksia grows in tall shrubland and kwongan and occurs on the south coast of Western Australia from Culham Inlet in the Fitzgerald River National Park and east to Israelite Bay.

== Conservation status ==
This banksia is classed as "not threatened" by the Western Australian Government Department of Parks and Wildlife.

== Use in horticulture ==
Seeds do not require any treatment, and take 17 to 48 days to germinate.
