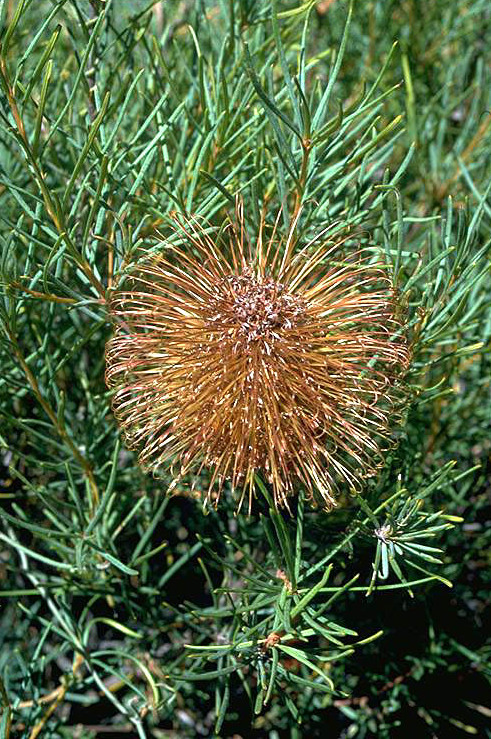

Scientific classification
- Kingdom: Plantae
- Clade: Tracheophytes
- Clade: Angiosperms
- Clade: Eudicots
- Order: Proteales
- Family: Proteaceae
- Genus: Banksia
- Subgenus: Banksia subg. Banksia
- Species: B. incana

Binomial name
- Banksia incana A.S.George

Synonyms
- Banksia sphaerocarpa var. glabrescens Meisn.

= Banksia incana =

Hoary banksia

Species of shrub endemic to Western Australia

Banksia incana, commonly known as the hoary banksia, is a species of shrub that is endemic to the south-west of Western Australia. It has hairy stems, narrow linear leaves, heads of bright yellow flowers and later, up to thirty-six follicles covered with greyish hairs in each head.

== Description ==
Banksia incana grows as a shrub, typically 70 cm (28 in) high and 100 cm (39 in) wide with many stems arising from a woody lignotuber. The stems are covered with woolly, greyish hairs. The leaves are narrow linear, 10–60 mm (0.39–2.36 in) long and 1.5–2 mm (0.059–0.079 in) wide on petiole 1–2 mm (0.039–0.079 in) long and with a sharp point on the tip. The flowers are borne on a spherical head 60–70 mm (2.4–2.8 in) in diameter. The flowers are bright yellow, sometimes reddish, the perianth 21–23 mm (0.83–0.91 in) long and the pistil 30–35 mm (1.2–1.4 in) long and hooked. Flowering occurs from November to April and up to thirty-six prominent, egg-shaped follicles, 18–33 mm (0.71–1.30 in) long, 4–15 mm (0.16–0.59 in) high and 10–30 mm (0.39–1.18 in) wide form in each head, the old flowers having fallen. The follicles are covered with short, greyish hairs.

== Taxonomy ==
Carl Meissner noted the hoary banksia as a distinct form of Banksia sphaerocarpa and in 1856 gave it the name Banksia sphaerocarpa var. glabrescens in de Candolle's Prodromus Systematis Naturalis Regni Vegetabilis.

Alex George raised the variety to species status in his 1981 monograph "The genus Banksia L.f. (Proteaceae)", based on a specimen he collected outside the Moore River Native Settlement, on 2 February 1967. He placed it in subgenus Banksia because of its flower spike, in section Oncostylis because its styles are hooked and in the resurrected series Abietinae, which he constrained to contain only round-fruited species. The specific epithet (incana) is from the Latin incanus ("hoary") and refers to the grey furry follicles.

In 2008, George describe two subspecies and the names are accepted by the Australian Plant Census:

- Banksia incana var. brachyphylla A.S.George – typically a mounded shrub with leaves usually 10–20 mm (0.39–0.79 in) long;
- Banksia incana A.S.George var. incana – typically an open shrub with leaves usually 30–50 mm (1.2–2.0 in) long.

The variety brachyphylla was described from a specimen collected at Big Soak Plain on the Coorow–Green Head road on 23 November 1999 .

== Distribution and habitat ==
Banksia incana grows in sand in heath, shrubland or woodland, often with B. attenuata and B. menziesii and occurs between the Arrowsmith River and Perth.

Variety brachyphylla is found between Arrowsmith and Mogumber with disjunct populations near Gingin and Perth.

== Ecology ==
Banksia incana resprouts from its woody lignotuber after bushfire.

Banksia incana is one of five closely related Banksia species that have highly unusual flower nectar. (Note: The other four species are Banksia sphaerocarpa, B. grossa, B. leptophylla and B. telmatiaea.) Whereas other Banksia species produce nectar that is clear and watery, the nectar of these species is pale yellow initially, but gradually becomes darker and thicker, changing to a thick, olive-green mucilage within one to two days of secretion, and eventually becoming "an almost black, gelatinous lump adhering to the base of the flowers". It was first noted by Byron Lamont in 1980; he attributed it to cyanobacteria that feed off the nectar sugars. Noting that many of these cyanobacteria had heterocysts, he speculated that they aid the plant by fixing atmospheric nitrogen, which is then washed off the flower heads by rain, and absorbed by the proteoid root mat. This purported symbiosis was investigated by Barrett and Lamont in 1985, but no evidence of nitrogen fixing was found. Further investigation by Markey and Lamont in 1996 suggested that the discolouration is not caused by cyanobacteria or other microorganisms in the nectar, but is rather "a chemical phenomenon of plant origin". Their analyses indicated that the nectar had unusually high levels of sugar and free amino acids, but three of these species, including B. sphaerocarpa, have since been shown to have normal nectar sugar compositions. The purpose of coloured nectar is unclear, especially as pollinators such as nocturnal mammals are not thought to forage by sight. However, nectar that becomes more obvious by appearance or smell as it ages might encourage pollinators to prioritise it over newer nectar. It is possible the colour change is unrelated to pollination.

== Conservation status ==
Both varieties of B. incana are classified as "not threatened" by the Western Australian Government Department of Parks and Wildlife.

== Use in horticulture ==
Seeds do not require any treatment, and take around 14 days to germinate.
