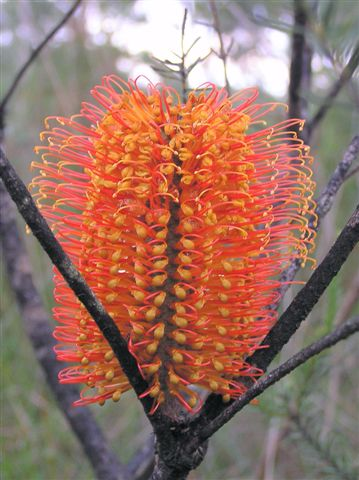
- Inflorescence of Banksia ericifolia (heath-leaved banksia), a member of Banksia sect. Oncostylis. The hooked pistils and commencement of top-down anthesis can be clearly be seen.

Scientific classification
- Kingdom: Plantae
- Clade: Tracheophytes
- Clade: Angiosperms
- Clade: Eudicots
- Order: Proteales
- Family: Proteaceae
- Genus: Banksia
- Subgenus: Banksia subg. Banksia
- Section: Banksia sect. Oncostylis; Benth.

Series
- Spicigerae; Tricuspidae; Dryandroideae; Abietinae

= Banksia sect. Oncostylis =

Section of plants found in Australia

Banksia sect. Oncostylis is one of four sections of subgenus Banksia subg. Banksia. It contains those Banksia species with hooked pistils. All of the species in Oncostylis also exhibit a top-down sequence of flower anthesis, except for Banksia nutans which is bottom-up.

Banksia sect. Oncostylis is further divided into four series, primarily on the overall shape of the inflorescence:

- Banksia ser. Spicigerae consists of seven species with cylindrical inflorescences.
- Banksia ser. Tricuspidae contains a single species, Banksia tricuspis.
- Banksia ser. Dryandroideae contains a single species, Banksia dryandroides.
- Banksia ser. Abietinae contains 13 species with inflorescences that are spherical or nearly so.

All Oncostylis species are endemic to southwest Western Australia, except for two members of series Spicigerae, Banksia ericifolia (heath-leaved banksia) and Banksia spinulosa (hairpin banksia), which are endemic to the east coast of Australia.

== See also ==
- Taxonomy of Banksia
