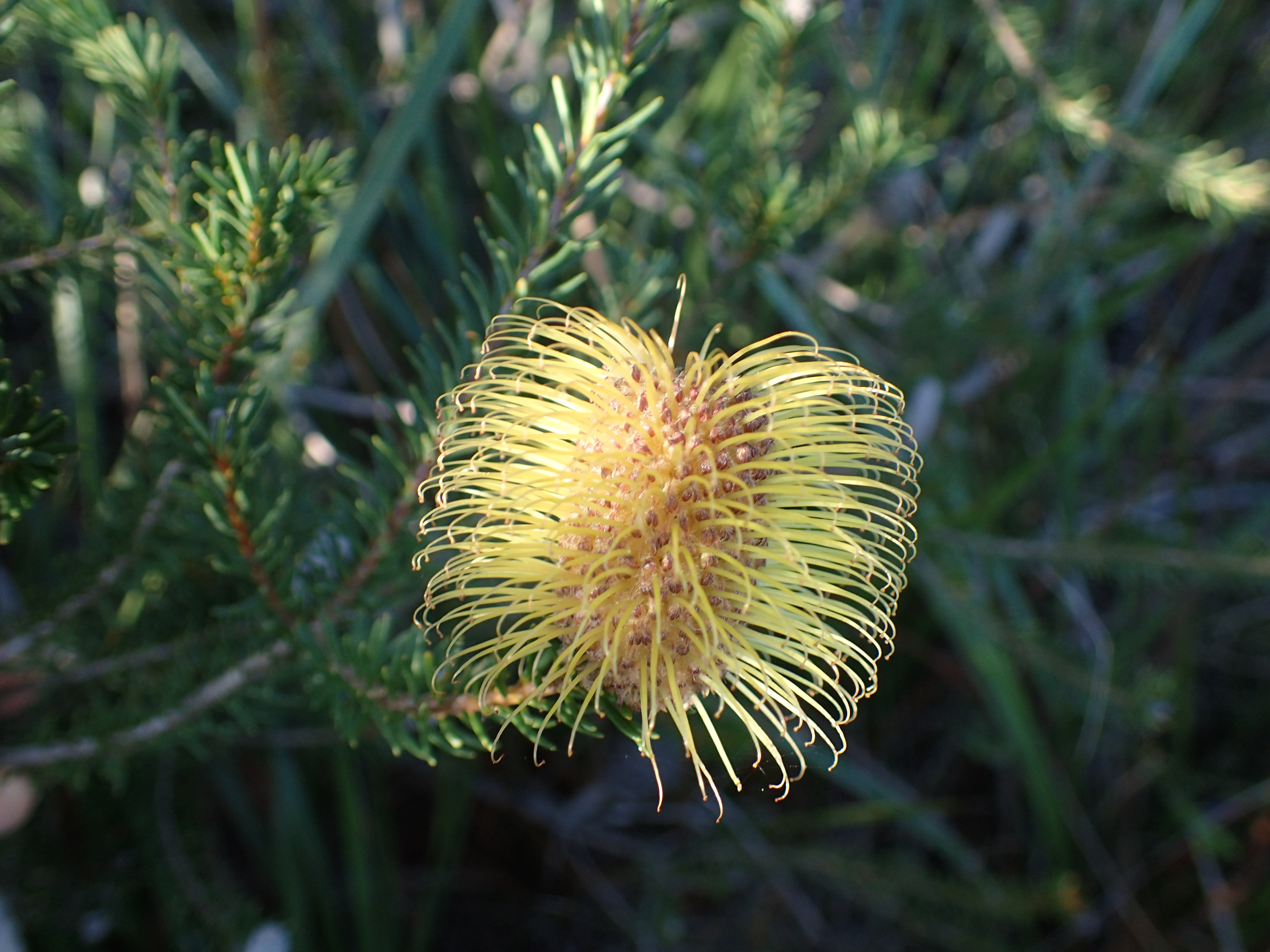
- Flower spike in Helms Arboretum north of Esperance

Conservation status
- Endangered (IUCN 3.1)

Scientific classification
- Kingdom: Plantae
- Clade: Embryophytes
- Clade: Tracheophytes
- Clade: Spermatophytes
- Clade: Angiosperms
- Clade: Eudicots
- Order: Proteales
- Family: Proteaceae
- Genus: Banksia
- Subgenus: Banksia subg. Banksia
- Species: B. meisneri

Binomial name
- Banksia meisneri Lehm.

Synonyms
- Banksia meissneri F.Muell. orth. var.; Sirmuellera meisneri (Lehm.) Kuntze

= Banksia meisneri =

Meisner's banksia

Species of shrub endemic to Western Australia

Banksia meisneri, commonly known as Meisner's banksia, is a shrub in the family Proteaceae. It is endemic to a small area in the south-west of Western Australia. It has crowded, more or less linear leaves and in winter and spring, spikes of golden brown flowers followed by furry fruit which usually only open after fire.

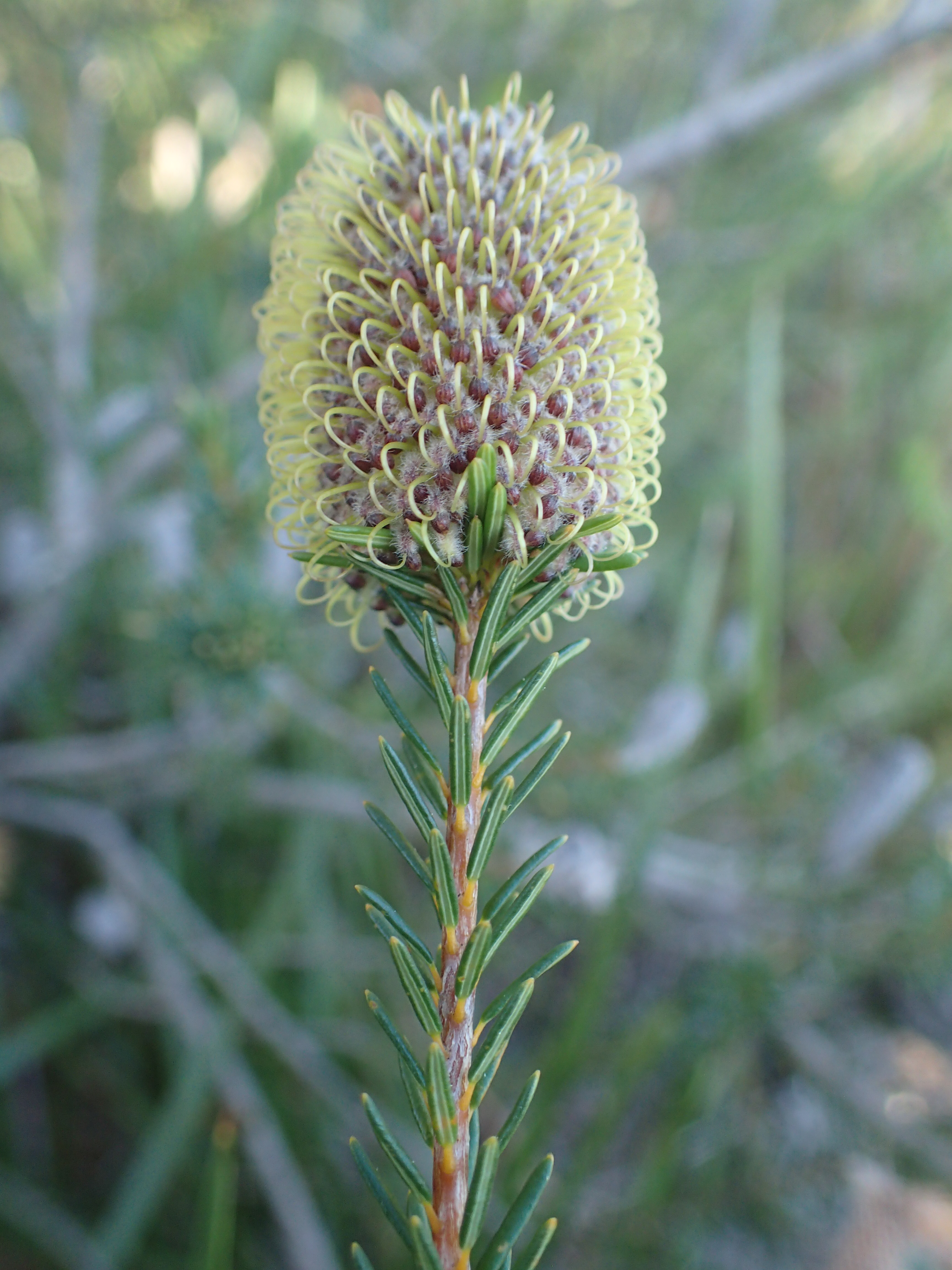
Branchlet with terminal spike of unopened flower buds

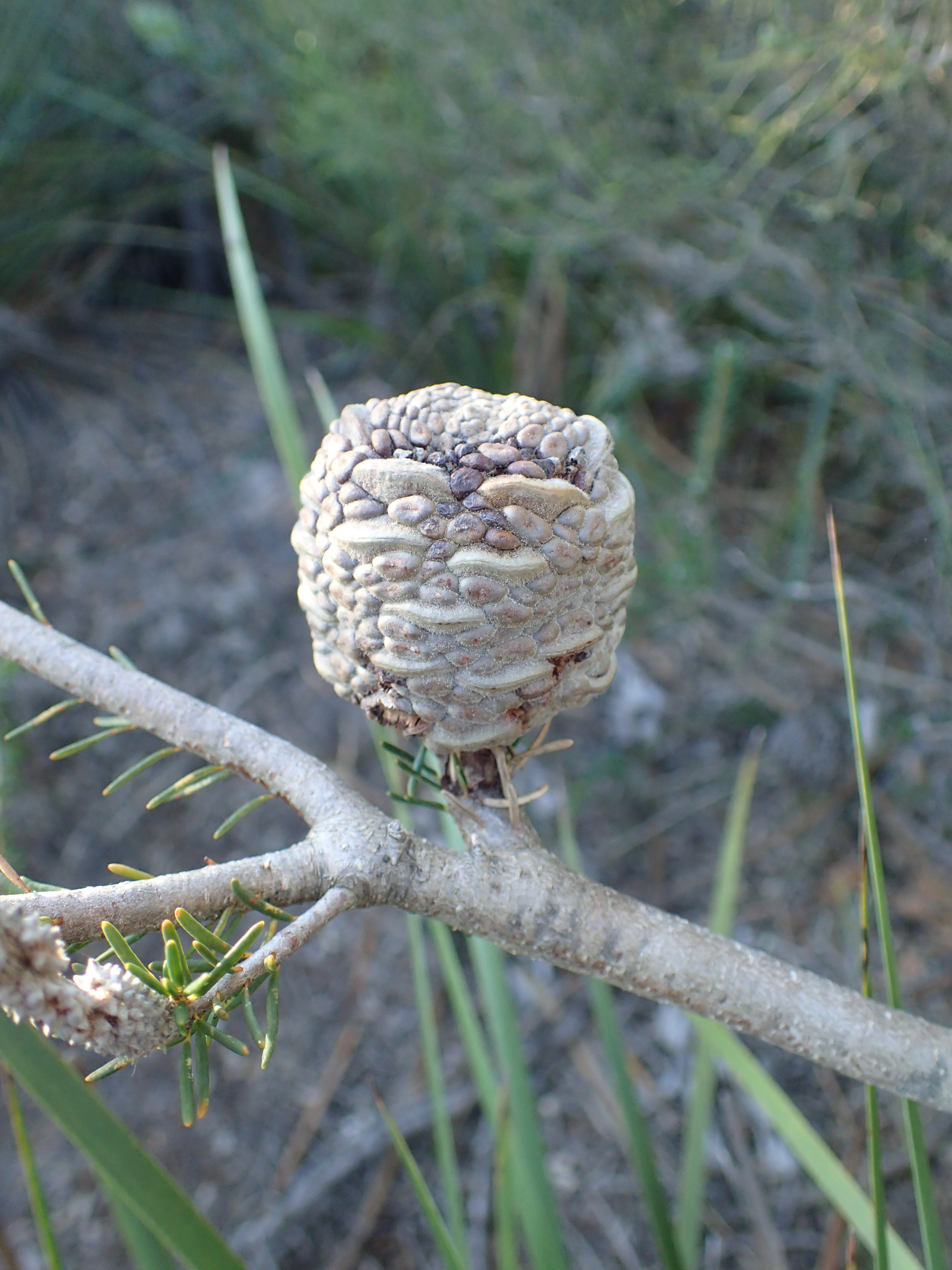
Fruit with unopened follicles

== Description ==
Banksia meisneri is a shrub which grow to a height of up to 2 m (7 ft) with a single stem at the base but much branched above. The branches are covered with woolly hair and have crowded linear to narrow elliptic leaves that are 3–7 mm (0.1–0.3 in) long and 1.0–1.5 mm (0.04–0.06 in) wide. The edges of the leaves are rolled under, the upper surface is woolly at first, becoming glabrous as it matures and the lower surface is woolly but mostly hidden by the rolled edges. The flower spikes develop mostly on side branches and are 20–30 mm (0.8–1 in) long and 45–50 mm (2–2 in) wide with small, hairy bracts at the base of the flowers. The flowers are golden brown with yellow styles, curved at the tip and the perianth is 7–9 mm (0.3–0.4 in) long and hairy on the outside. The infructescence is more or less spherical or slightly compressed vertically, 30–40 mm (1–2 in) long and 40–50 mm (2–2 in) wide, with the individual follicles 1–7 mm (0.04–0.3 in) high and 3–4 mm (0.1–0.2 in) wide. Flowering occurs from April to September and the follicles usually remain closed until after fire.

== Taxonomy and naming ==
Banksia meisneri was first formally described in 1845 by Johann Georg Christian Lehmann and the description was published in Plantae Preissianae. The specific epithet (meisneri) honours the Swiss botanist, Carl Meissner.

In 1891, Otto Kuntze, in his Revisio Generum Plantarum, rejected the generic name Banksia L.f., on the grounds that the name Banksia had previously been published in 1776 as Banksia J.R.Forst & G.Forst, referring to the genus now known as Pimelea. Kuntze proposed Sirmuellera as an alternative, referring to this species as Sirmuellera meisneri. This application of the principle of priority was largely ignored by Kuntze's contemporaries, and Banksia L.f. was formally conserved and Sirmuellera rejected in 1940.

In 1981, Alex George described two varieties of B. meisneri in the journal Nuytsia:

- Banksia meisneri var. ascendens A.S.George that has leaves 8–15 mm (0.31–0.59 in) long and more or less directed upwards;
- Banksia meisneri Lehm. var. meisneri that has leaves 3–7 mm (0.12–0.28 in) long and spreading or directed downwards.

In 1996, George raised the two varieties of B. meisneri to subspecies status and the names have been accepted at the Australian Plant Census:

- Banksia meisneri subsp. ascendens (A.S.George) A.S.George;
- Banksia meisneri (A.S.George) A.S.George subsp. meisneri.

== Distribution and habitat ==
Meisner's banksia is found between Collie, Pingrup and Tenterden in the Avon Wheatbelt, Esperance Plains and Jarrah Forest biogeographic regions of Western Australia. It grows in deep sand in shrubland and low woodland in low-lying flats.

== Ecology ==
This banksia does not have a lignotuber and is killed by fire, when the follicles open and release the seeds.

== Conservation status ==
Banksia meisneri is classed as "not threatened" by the Western Australian Government Department of Parks and Wildlife, but subspecies ascendens is classified as "Priority Four" meaning that is rare or near threatened. The IUCN Red List categorizes it as endangered.

== Use in horticulture ==
This banksia has only rarely been grown in cultivation. It is fast growing and flowers from seed after about five years. A Mediterranean climate is preferred and the species is difficult to maintain in eastern Australia. It is grown from seed which germinates after between 28 and 39 days.
