= Timeline of Banksia =

Timeline of the Australian plant genus

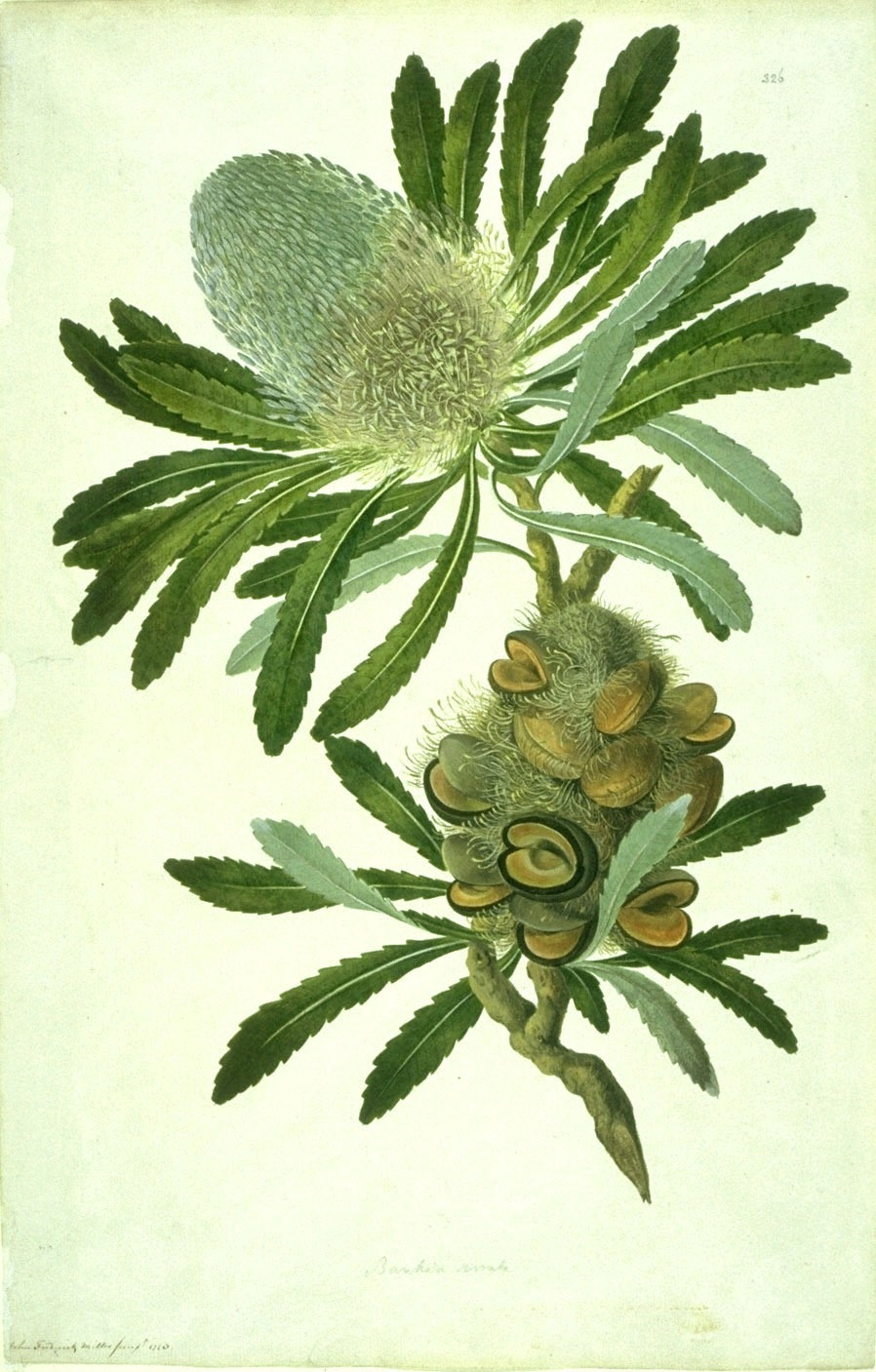
Banksia serrata as painted by Sydney Parkinson during the voyage on which the genus was first collected.

This is a timeline of developments in knowledge and understanding of the Australian plant genus Banksia:

== 18th century ==
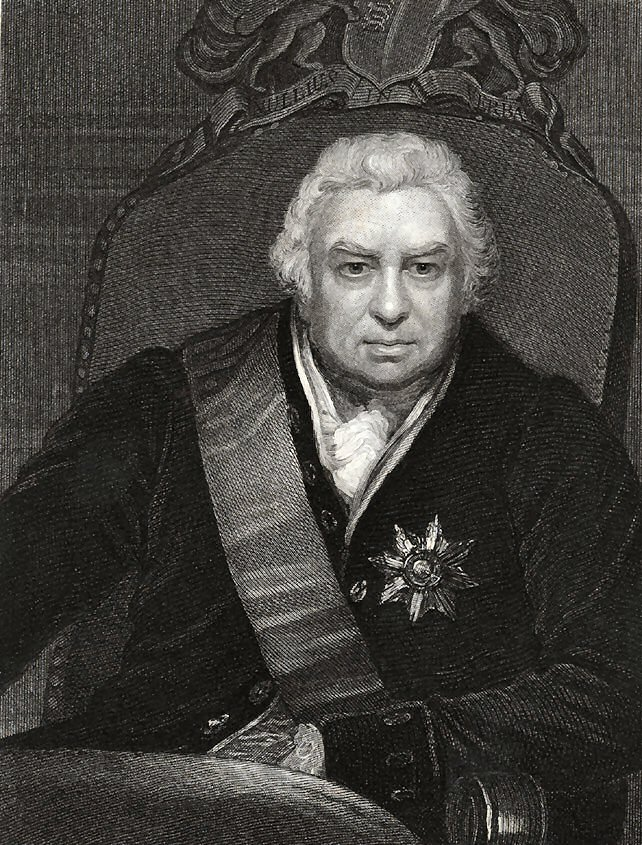
Joseph Banks

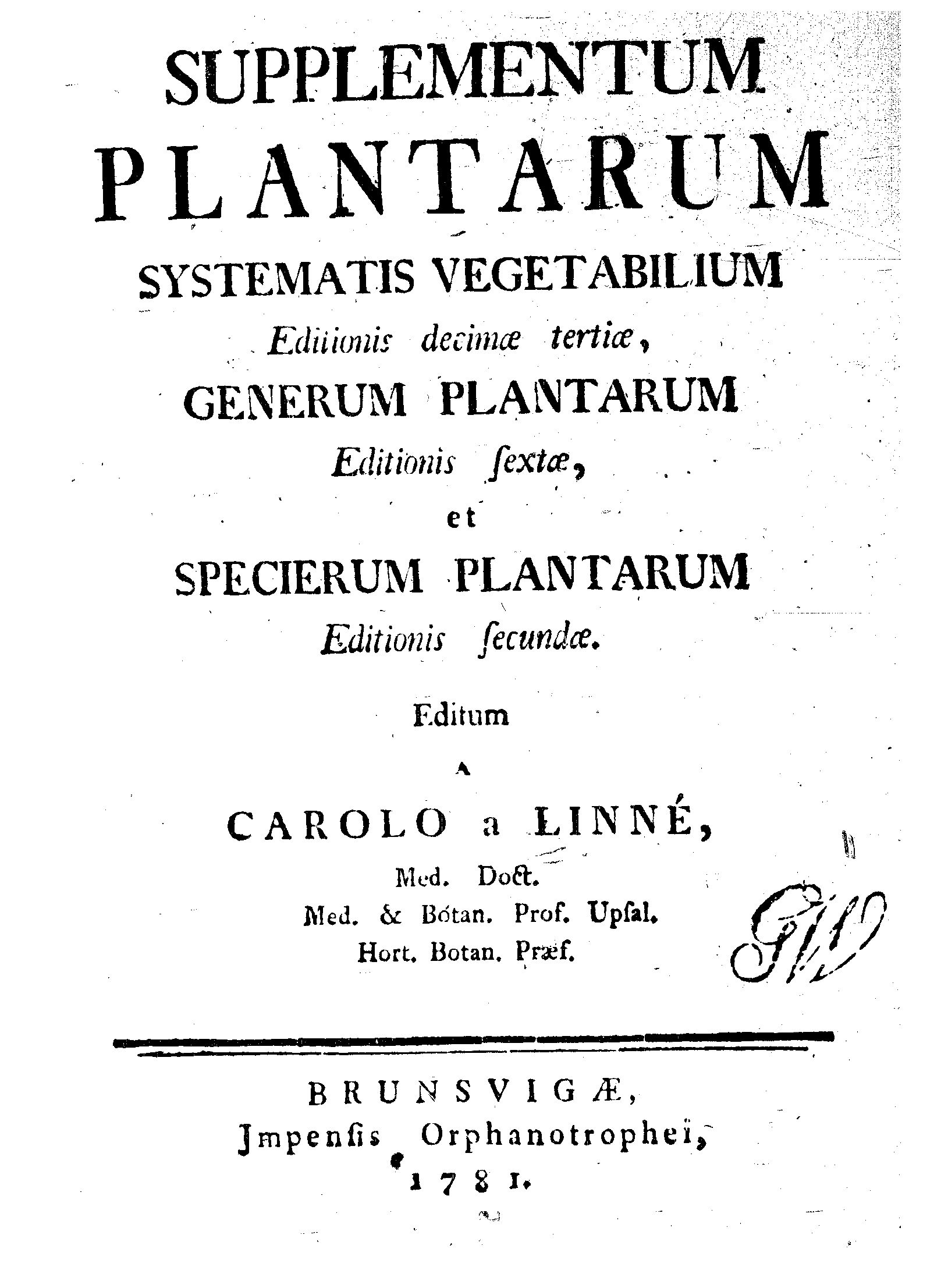
The genus Banksia was first published by Carolus Linnaeus the Younger in his 1782 Supplementum Plantarum.

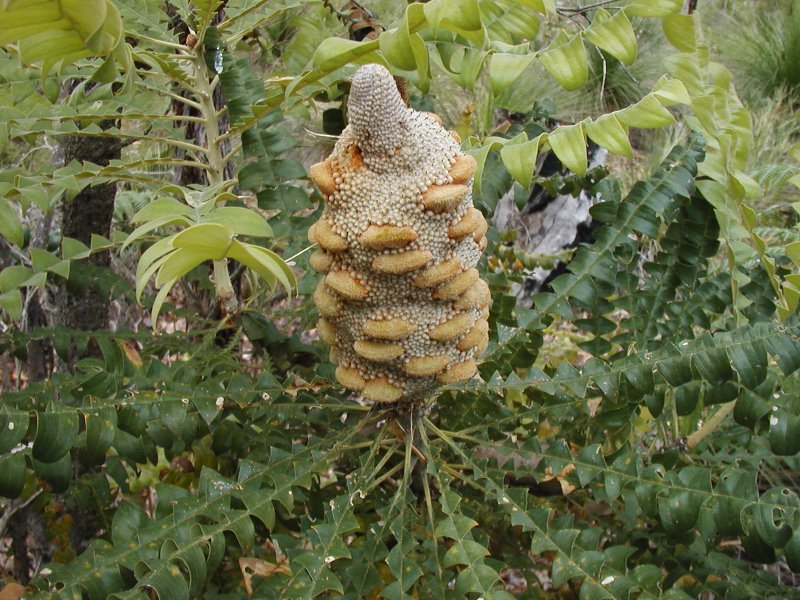
B. praemorsa was one of the first two Banksia species collected from Western Australia.

- April 1770 - Sir Joseph Banks and Dr Daniel Solander collect the first specimens of Banksia at Botany Bay, New South Wales. Four species are represented: B. serrata (saw banksia), B. integrifolia (coast banksia), B. ericifolia (heath-leaved banksia) and B. robur (swamp banksia).
- June 1770 – Banks and Solander collect specimens of B. dentata (tropical banksia) at Endeavour River, Queensland.
- 1776 – David Nelson collects specimens of B. marginata (silver banksia) from South Bruny Island, Tasmania.
- April 1782 – Carolus Linnaeus the Younger publishes Supplementum Plantarum. The genus Banksia is formally published, as are four species: B. serrata, B. integrifolia, B. ericifolia and B. dentata.
- 1788 – John White collects specimens of B. spinulosa (hairpin banksia)
- October–November 1791 – Archibald Menzies collects specimens and seed of B. grandis (Bull Banksia) and B. praemorsa (Cut Leaf Banksia) at King George Sound, Western Australia.
- 1792 – Jacques Labillardière collects specimens of B. repens (Creeping Banksia) and B. speciosa (Showy Banksia) at Esperance Bay.
- 1793 – James Edward Smith publishes B. spinulosa.
- 1793 – Luis Née makes an extensive collection at Port Jackson, New South Wales, including the first specimens of B. oblongifolia (fern-leaved banksia), and new specimens of the undescribed B. marginata and B. robur.
- 1798 – Carl Willdenow publishes B. grandis.

== 19th century ==
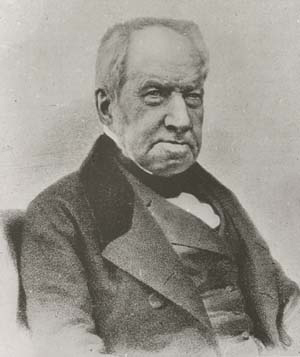
Robert Brown was a key figure in the collection and study of Banksia in the 19th century.

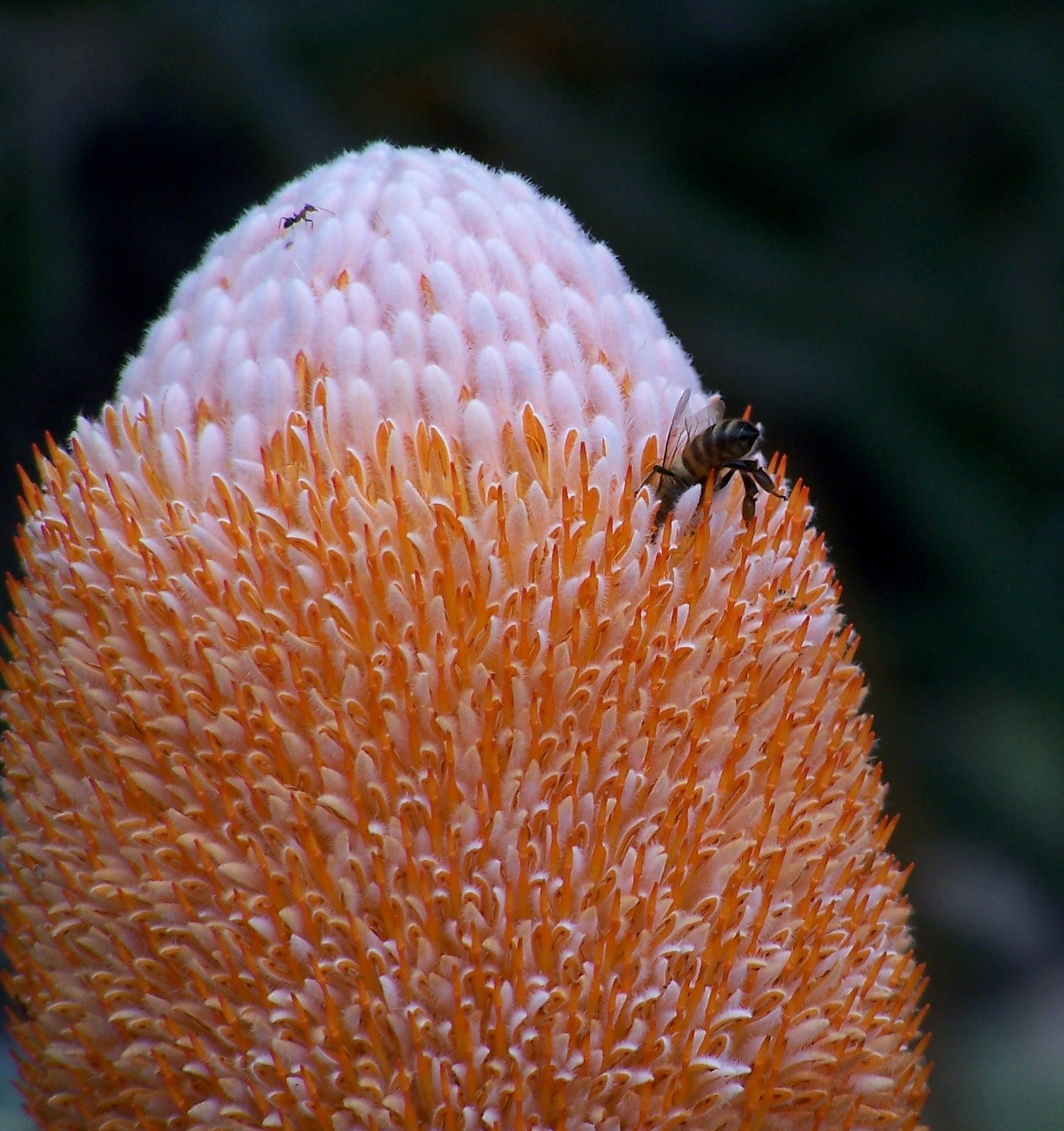
B.prionotes

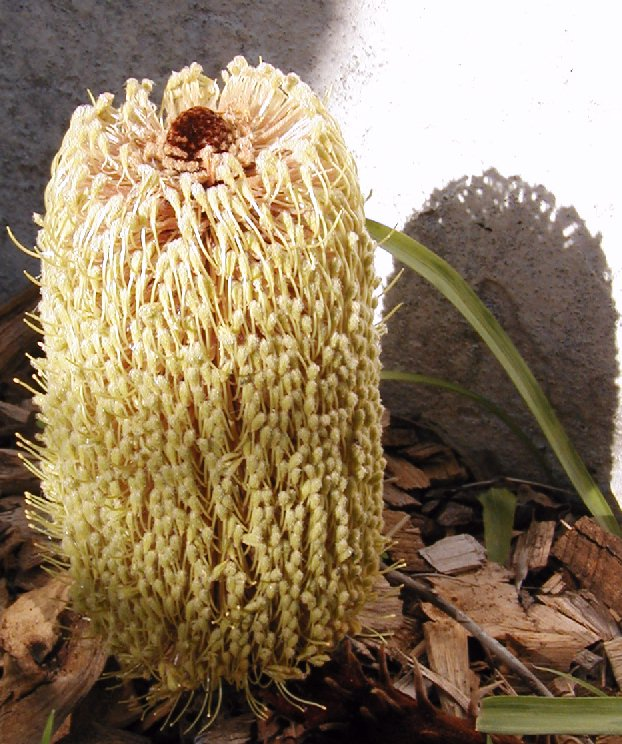
B. petiolaris

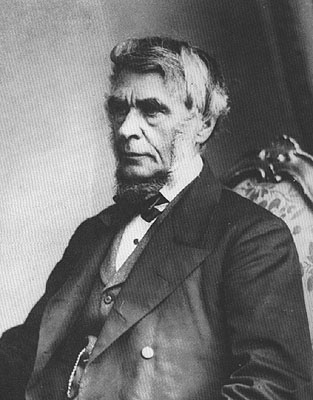
George Bentham's 1870 arrangement of Banksia would stand for over 100 years.

- Early 19th century – George Caley collects specimens of B. spinulosa var. collina at Newcastle, New South Wales.
- 1800 – Labillardière publishes B. repens.
- 1800 – Antonio José Cavanilles publishes B. marginata, B. robur and B. oblongifolia.
- December 1801–January 1802 – Robert Brown collects specimens of eight new Banksia species at King George Sound: B. sphaerocarpa (Fox Banksia), B. occidentalis (red swamp banksia), B. littoralis (swamp banksia), B. verticillata (Granite Banksia), B. coccinea (Scarlet Banksia), B. attenuata (Candlestick Banksia), B. quercifolia (Oak-leaved Banksia) and B. ilicifolia (Holly-leaved Banksia). He then moves on to Lucky Bay, where he collects the first specimens of B. pulchella (Teasel Banksia) and B. nutans (Nodding Banksia), and makes a new collection of the undescribed B. speciosa.
- 1802 – Henry Cranke Andrews publishes B. praemorsa.
- June 1802 – Brown collects specimens of B. paludosa (swamp banksia) and B. aemula (wallum banksia) at Port Jackson.
- August 1802 - Brown collects specimens of B. integrifolia subsp. compar near Keppel Bay, Queensland.
- 1809 The controversial Richard Anthony Salisbury publishes two species of Banksia, though with inadequate descriptions for the definitions to be applied, the names are not used.
- 1810 – Brown publishes the first taxonomic arrangement of Banksia in his Prodromus Florae Novae Hollandiae et Insulae Van Diemen. This includes the first published descriptions of the thirteen species he collected in 1801–1802. and also publication of B. spinulosa var. collina at species rank as B. collina, and B. integrifolia subsp. compar at species rank as B. compar. In total, 31 species of Banksia are listed. These are divided into two subgenera, with B. ilicifolia placed alone in subgenus Isostylis, and all other species placed in Banksia Verae, the True Banksias.
- 1823 – Franz Sieber collects the first specimen of B. spinulosa var. cunninghamii at Mount York in the Blue Mountains of New South Wales.
- 1823 – William Baxter collects the first specimens of B. gardneri (Prostrate Banksia) and B. dryandroides (Dryandra-leaved Banksia) at King George Sound.
- 1824 – Baxter collects the first specimen of B. media (southern plains banksia) between Cape Arid and Lucky Bay in Western Australia.
- 1827 – Heinrich Reichenbach published B. spinulosa var. cunninghamii at species rank as B. cunninghamii.
- March 1827 – Charles Fraser collects the first specimen of Banksia menziesii (Firewood Banksia) at the Swan River in Western Australia.
- 1828 – Robert Sweet publishes B. dryandroides.
- 1829 – At King George Sound, Baxter collects the first specimens of B. caleyi (Cayley's Banksia), B. baxteri (Baxter's Banksia), Banksia goodii (Good's Banksia) and Banksia brownii (Brown's Banksia). He then travels inland to the Stirling Range, where he collects the first specimens of B. baueri (Woolly Banksia) and B. solandri (Stirling Range Banksia).
- 1830 – Brown published B. media, B. caleyi, B. baueri, B. menziesii, B. solandri, B. baxteri, B. goodii and B. brownii. He published B. gardneri as Banksia prostrata, but this is later ruled an illegitimate name.
- late 1830s – James Drummond (botanist) collects the first specimen of B. prionotes (Acorn Banksia) from near the Swan River.
- 1840 – John Lindley publishes B. prionotes.
- October 1840 – Ludwig Preiss collects the first specimen of B. meisneri (Meissner's Banksia).
- 1841 – During an expedition east of Toodyay, Western Australia, Drummond collects the first specimen of Banksia incana (Hoary Banksia).
- 1845 – Johann Lehmann published B. meisneri.
- Early 1847 – Drummond collects the first specimen of Banksia lemanniana (Lehmann's Banksia).
- Late 1848 – Drummond collects the first specimen of Banksia laevigata (Tennis Ball Banksia).
- 1851 – Ferdinand von Mueller collects the first specimen of B. ornata (desert banksia) near Willunga, South Australia.
- 1851–1852 – During an expedition from Perth to Champion Bay, Drummond collects the first specimens of B. leptophylla (Slender-leaved Banksia), B. tricuspis (Lesueur Banksia), B. candolleana (Propeller Banksia), B. elegans (Elegant Banksia), B. victoriae (Wooly Orange Banksia), B. hookeriana (Hooker's Banksia), Banksia lindleyana (Porcupine Banksia) and B. sceptrum (Sceptre Banksia).
- 1853 – Carl Meissner publishes B. ornata.
- 1855 – Meissner publishes the species collected by Drummond in 1851–1852. B. leptophylla is published as B. pinifolia, but this is later ruled an illegitimate name.
- 1856 – Meissner publishes a taxonomy of the Proteaceae, including his arrangement of Banksia. B. laevigata, B. lemanniana and B. incana are published, the last of these as B. sphaerocarpa var. glabrescens, but it is later promoted to species rank and renamed. In total, 58 species are listed; these are classified into two sections and four series.
- 1861 – George Maxwell makes an expedition along the south coast of Western Australia, collecting the first specimens of B. blechnifolia and Banksia petiolaris.
- 1864 – Mueller published B. blechifolia and B. petiolaris.
- 1867 – Mueller collects the first specimen of B. oreophila (western mountain banksia) at Toolbrunup in the Stirling Ranges.

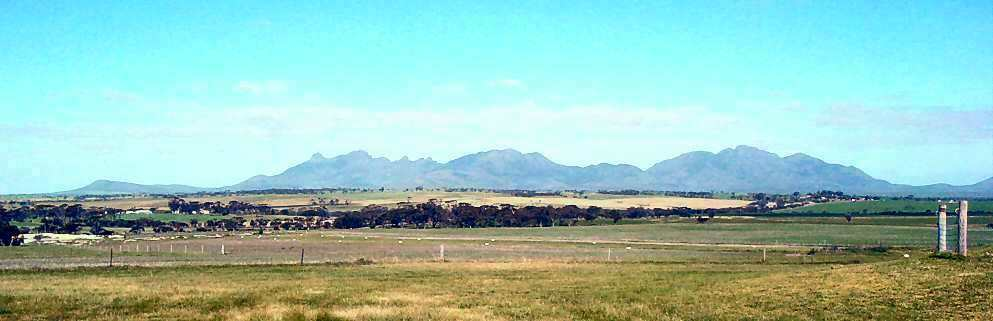
Stirling Ranges, Western Australia

- 1869 – Mueller publishes B. oreophila as B. quercifolia var. integrifolia; this would later be promoted to species rank, forcing a rename.
- 1870 – George Bentham publishes a new arrangement for Banksia in his Flora Australiensis. No new species are published; in fact Bentham reduces the number of species from 60 to 46. Bentham's classification uses two subgenera and four sections, and would stand for over 100 years.
- 1891 - Otto Kuntze challenges Banksia L.f. on grounds of precedence of Banksia J.R.Forst & G.Forst, proposing the name Sirmuellera Kuntze in place of Banksia L.f. The challenge fails.
- 17 September 1891 – Richard Helms collects the first specimen of B. elderiana (Swordfish Banksia) in the Great Victoria Desert.
- 1896 – Mueller and Ralph Tate publish B. elderiana.

== 20th century ==
In 1981, Alex George published The genus Banksia L.f. (Proteaceae), the first thorough revision of the genus for over a century.

The Banksia Atlas project greatly increased knowledge of the distribution, habitat and diversity of Banksia.

- December 1926 – Charles Gardner collects the first specimens of B. violacea (Violet Banksia) and B. audax.
- 1928 – These two species are published by Gardner.
- 1930 - Edwin Ashby collects the first specimen of B. ashbyi (Ashby's Banksia) near Yuna, Western Australia.
- c. 1930 – William Burdett collects the first specimen of B. burdettii (Burdett's Banksia) near Watheroo, Western Australia.
- 1934 – Edmund Baker publishes B. ashbyi and B. burdettii.
- January 1940 – Gardner collects the first specimen of B. benthamiana (Bentham's Banksia) from Dalwallinu, Western Australia.
- July 1958 – Gardner collects the first specimen of B. laricina (Rose-fruited Banksia) from Beermullah, Western Australia.
- 1960 – Gardner collects the first specimen of B. pilostylis (Marsh Banksia) near Young River, Western Australia.
- 27 November 1962 – James Willis collects type material for B. canei (mountain banksia) after nurseryman William Cane draw attention to its distinctness.
- 1 January 1964 – Alex George collects the first specimen of B. laevigata subsp. fuscolutea east of Hyden, Western Australia.
- 1964 – Gardner publishes B. laricina, B. pilostylis and B. benthamiana.
- 1966 – George publishes B. laevigata subsp. fuscolutea.
- March 1966 – Gardner collects the first specimen of B. lullfitzii from Koorarawalyee, Western Australia. He publishes it later that year.
- 1967 – Willis publishes B. canei.
- 1974 – Celia Rosser begins a 25-year project to paint every Banksia species.
- 1975 – L. A. S. Johnson and Barbara Briggs publish their taxonomic arrangement of the Proteaceae. Banksia is placed in subfamily Grevilleoideae, tribe Banksieae, and subtribe Banksiinae, alongside its close relative Dryandra.
- 1981 – George publishes The genus Banksia L.f. (Proteaceae), in which he presents the first major revision of the genus for over a century. Ten new species and nine new varieties are published: B. aculeata (Prickly Banksia), B. chamaephyton (fishbone banksia), B. conferta (Glasshouse Banksia) (and therefore also the autonym B. conferta var. conferta, now B. conferta subsp. conferta), B. conferta var. penicillata (now B. conferta subsp. penicillata), B. cuneata (Matchstick Banksia), B. ericifolia var. macrantha (now B. ericifolia subsp. macrantha), B. gardneri var. brevidentata, B. gardneri var. hiemalis, B. grossa (Coarse Banksia), B. integrifolia var. aquilonia (now B. aquilonia), B. lanata (Coomallo Banksia), B. littoralis var. seminuda (now B. seminuda), B. meisneri var. ascendens (now B. meisneri subsp. ascendens), B. micrantha, B. nutans var. cernuella, B. plagiocarpa (Dallachy's Banksia), B. saxicola (Grampians Banksia), B. scabrella (Burma Road Banksia), B. sphaerocarpa var. caesia, B. sphaerocarpa var. dolichostyla and B. telmatiaea (Swamp Fox Banksia). B. collina is demoted to B. spinulosa var. collina, and B. cunninghamii was demoted to B. spinulosa var. cunninghamii. A new infrageneric classification is proposed, and lectotypes are declared for most pre-existing Banksia taxa.
- 1984 – Barbara Rye promotes B. littoralis var. seminuda to species rank as B. seminuda.
- 1984 - George publishes The Banksia Book.
- February 1984 - Commencement of The Banksia Atlas project, a three-year nationwide program that mobilised over 400 volunteers to make field observations of Banksia specimens.
- 1987 George publishes B. epica, B. oligantha (Wagin banksia), B. leptophylla var. melletica and B. spinulosa var. neoanglica, all of which were discovered during The Banksia Atlas project.
- 1988 – Publication of The Banksia Atlas.
- 1996 – Kevin Thiele and Pauline Ladiges publish A Cladistic Analysis of Banksia, in which they propose a number of changes to George's taxonomic arrangement.
- 1996 – George promotes B. integrifolia subsp. aquilonia to species rank as B. aquilonia.
- 1999 – George publishes a monograph on the taxonomy of Banksia as part of the Flora of Australia book series. Most of Thiele and Ladiges' changes are rejected.

== 21st century ==
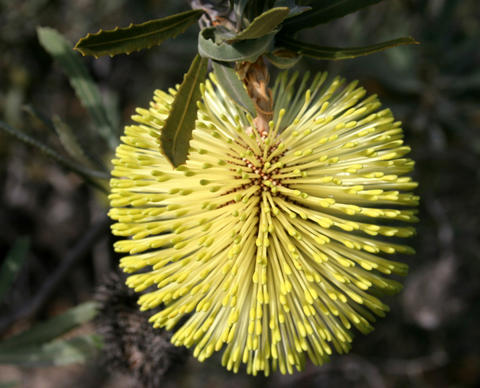
B. rosserae, the most recently discovered and described Banksia species.

- 2000 – Rosser's project to paint every Banksia species concludes with the publication of the third and final volume of her monograph The Banksias.
- 2000 – B. rosserae is discovered. Accounts of its discovery differ, with some attributing Ann Pilkington, and others John Cullen.
- 2002 – Peter Olde and Neil Marriott publish B. rosserae.
- 2002 and 2005 – Austin Mast and co-authors publish cladistic analyses of genetic data, that suggest two large Banksia clades, which they name "/Cryptostomata" ("hidden stomates") and "/Phanerostomata" ("visible stomates"). Their results also strongly suggest that Banksia is polyphyletic with Dryandra.
- 2007 Austin Mast and Kevin Thiele transfer Dryandra to Banksia and publish B. subg. Spathulatae for the "/Phanerostomata", thereby redefining B. subg. Banksia as containing the "/Cryptostomata".
