= George's taxonomic arrangement of Banksia =

1981 and 1996 arrangements of the Australian endemic plant genus Banksia

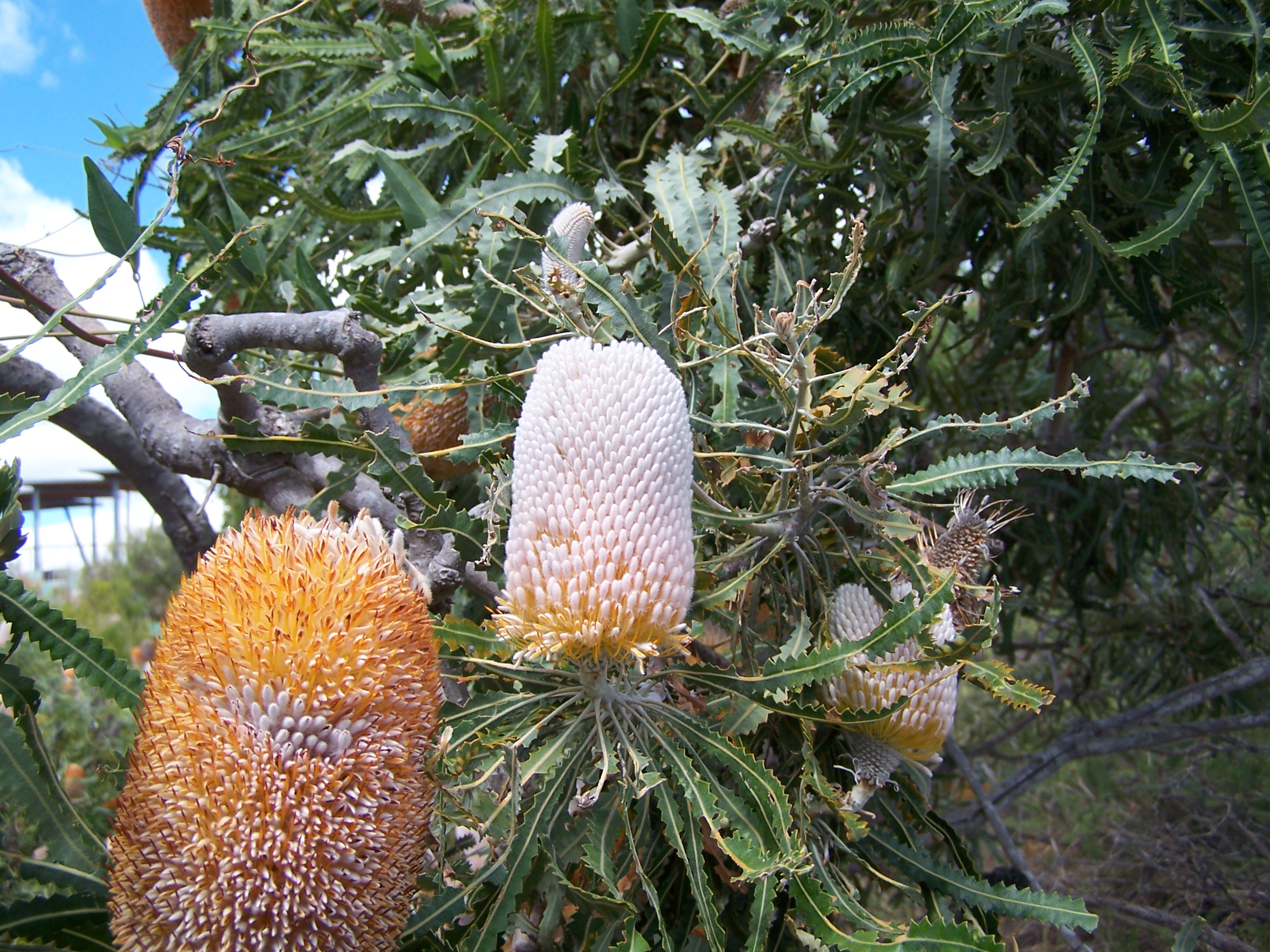
Banksia prionotes

Alex George's taxonomic arrangement of Banksia was the first modern-day arrangement for that genus. First published in 1981 in the classic monograph The genus Banksia L.f. (Proteaceae), it superseded the arrangement of George Bentham, which had stood for over a hundred years. It was overturned in 1996 by Kevin Thiele and Pauline Ladiges, but restored by George in 1999. A recent publication by Austin Mast and Kevin Thiele suggests that it will soon be overturned again.

== Background ==
Banksia is a genus of around 80 species in the plant family Proteaceae. An iconic Australian wildflower and popular garden plant, they are easily recognised by their characteristic flower spikes and fruiting "cones". They grow in forms varying from prostrate woody shrubs to trees up to 35 metres tall, and occur in all but the most arid areas of Australia. As heavy producers of nectar, they are important sources of food for nectariferous animals such as honeyeaters and honey possum, and they are of economic importance to the nursery and cut flower industries. However they are seriously threatened by a number of processes including land clearing, frequent burning, and disease, and a number of species are rare and endangered.

Specimens of Banksia were first collected by Sir Joseph Banks and Dr Daniel Solander, naturalists on the Endeavour during Lieutenant (later Captain) James Cook's 1770 voyage to the Pacific Ocean. A number of arrangements were published in the 1800s, culminating in George Bentham's 1870 arrangement. This arrangement would stand for over a hundred years.

== 1981 arrangement ==
George's arrangement of Banksia was first published in his 1981 monograph The genus Banksia L.f. (Proteaceae). The arrangement was as follows:

Banksia

B. subg. Banksia

B. sect. Banksia

B. ser. Salicinae

B. dentata
B. integrifolia

B. integrifolia var. integrifolia (now B. integrifolia subsp. integrifolia)
B. integrifolia var. compar (now B. integrifolia subsp. compar)
B. integrifolia var. aquilonia (now Banksia aquilonia)

B. conferta

B. conferta var. conferta (now B. conferta subsp. conferta)
B. conferta var. penicillata (now B. conferta subsp. penicillata)

B. marginata
B. canei
B. saxicola
B. oblongifolia
B. robur
B. paludosa

B. ser. Grandes

B. grandis
B. solandri

B. ser. Quercinae

B. quercifolia
B. oreophila
B. baueri

B. ser. Orthostylis (now B. ser. Banksia)

B. serrata
B. aemula
B. ornata
B. menziesii
B. speciosa
B. baxteri
B. candolleana
B. sceptrum

B. ser. Crocinae

B. prionotes
B. victoriae
B. hookerana (now spelled B. hookeriana)
B. burdettii

B. ser. Cyrtostylis

B. media
B. praemorsa
B. pilostylis
B. attenuata
B. lindleyana
B. ashbyi
B. benthamiana
B. audax
B. laevigata

B. laevigata subsp. laevigata
B. laevigata subsp. fuscolutea

B. lullfitzii
B. elderana (now spelled B. elderiana)
B. elegans

B. ser. Prostratae

B. goodii
B. gardneri

B. gardneri var. gardneri
B. gardneri var. brevidentata
B. gardneri var. hiemalis

B. chamaephyton
B. repens
B. blechnifolia
B. petiolaris

B. ser. Tetragonae

B. lemanniana
B. caleyi
B. aculeata

B. ser. Coccineae

B. coccinea

B. sect. Oncostylis

B. ser. Spicigerae

B. spinulosa

B. spinulosa var. spinulosa
B. spinulosa var. collina
B. spinulosa var. cunninghamii

B. ericifolia

B. ericifolia subsp. ericifolia
B. ericifolia subsp. macrantha

B. brownii
B. occidentalis
B. littoralis

B. littoralis var. littoralis
B. littoralis var. seminuda (now B. seminuda)

B. verticillata
B. tricuspis

B. ser. Dryandroideae

B. dryandroides

B. ser. Abietinae

B. sphaerocarpa

B. sphaerocarpa var. sphaerocarpa
B. sphaerocarpa var. caesia
B. sphaerocarpa var. dolichostyla

B. micrantha
B. grossa
B. leptophylla
B. lanata
B. scabrella
B. telmatiaea
B. laricina
B. incana
B. violacea
B. meisneri

B. meisneri subsp. meisneri
B. meisneri subsp. ascendens

B. pulchella
B. nutans

B. nutans var. nutans
B. nutans var. cernuella

B. subg. Isostylis

B. ilicifolia
B. cuneata

== 1999 arrangement ==
George's arrangement was superseded by Thiele and Ladiges' arrangement in 1996, but in 1999 George largely restored it in his 1999 treatment of the Flora of Australia series. George's 1999 treatment included a number of taxa described after 1981, followed Thiele and Ladiges in a few minor rankings, and altered the phyletic order of taxa in places, but it was otherwise identical to his 1981 arrangement. None of Thiele and Ladiges' four promotions to species rank was accepted, and none of the thirteen infrageneric taxa introduced by Thiele and Ladiges was retained.

George's 1999 taxonomic arrangement of Banksia was as follows:

Banksia

B. subg. Banksia

B. sect. Banksia

B. ser. Salicinae

B. dentata
B. aquilonia
B. integrifolia

B. integrifolia subsp. integrifolia
B. integrifolia subsp. compar
B. integrifolia subsp. monticola

B. plagiocarpa
B. oblongifolia
B. robur
B. conferta

B. conferta subsp. conferta
B. conferta subsp. penicillata

B. paludosa

B. paludosa subsp. astrolux
B. paludosa subsp. paludosa

B. marginata
B. canei
B. saxicola

B. ser. Grandes

B. grandis
B. solandri

B. ser. Banksia

B. serrata
B. aemula
B. ornata
B. baxteri
B. speciosa
B. menziesii
B. candolleana
B. sceptrum

B. ser. Crocinae

B. prionotes
B. burdettii
B. hookeriana
B. victoriae

B. ser. Prostratae

B. goodii
B. gardneri

B. gardneri var. gardneri
B. gardneri var. brevidentata
B. gardneri var. hiemalis

B. chamaephyton
B. blechnifolia
B. repens
B. petiolaris

B. ser. Cyrtostylis

B. media
B. praemorsa
B. epica
B. pilostylis
B. attenuata
B. ashbyi
B. benthamiana
B. audax
B. lullfitzii
B. elderiana
B. laevigata

B. laevigata subsp. laevigata
B. laevigata subsp. fuscolutea

B. elegans
B. lindleyana

B. ser. Tetragonae

B. lemanniana
B. caleyi
B. aculeata

B. ser. Bauerinae

B. baueri

B. ser. Quercinae

B. quercifolia
B. oreophila

B. sect. Coccinea

B. coccinea

B. sect. Oncostylis

B. ser. Spicigerae

B. spinulosa

B. spinulosa var. spinulosa
B. spinulosa var. collina
B. spinulosa var. neoanglica
B. spinulosa var. cunninghamii

B. ericifolia

B. ericifolia subsp. ericifolia
B. ericifolia subsp. macrantha

B. verticillata
B. seminuda
B. littoralis
B. occidentalis
B. brownii

B. ser. Tricuspidae

B. tricuspis

B. ser. Dryandroideae

B. dryandroides

B. ser. Abietinae

B. sphaerocarpa

B. sphaerocarpa var. sphaerocarpa
B. sphaerocarpa var. caesia
B. sphaerocarpa var. dolichostyla

B. micrantha
B. grossa
B. telmatiaea
B. leptophylla

B. leptophylla var. leptophylla
B. leptophylla var. melletica

B. lanata
B. scabrella
B. violacea
B. incana
B. laricina
B. pulchella
B. meisneri

B. meisneri subsp. meisneri
B. meisneri subsp. ascendens

B. nutans

B. nutans var. nutans
B. nutans var. cernuella

B. subg. Isostylis

B. ilicifolia
B. oligantha
B. cuneata

== Legacy ==
George's arrangement was undisputed as the accepted arrangement between 1981 and 1996. It was replaced by the arrangement of Thiele and Ladiges in 1996, but this lasted only until 1999, when George published a revised version of his 1981 arrangement. This revised version was not universally accepted, however: some Australian herbaria continued to follow Thiele and Ladiges on some points, for example, by recognising the four species that they promoted.

In 2005, Austin Mast, Eric Jones and Shawn Havery published the results of their cladistic analyses of DNA sequence data for Banksia. They inferred a phylogeny very greatly different from George's taxonomic arrangement, including finding Banksia to be paraphyletic with respect to Dryandra. A new taxonomic arrangement was not published at the time, but early in 2007 Mast and Thiele initiated a rearrangement by transferring Dryandra to Banksia, and publishing B. subg. Spathulatae for the species having spoon-shaped cotyledons. They foreshadowed publishing a full arrangement once DNA sampling of Dryandra was complete.
