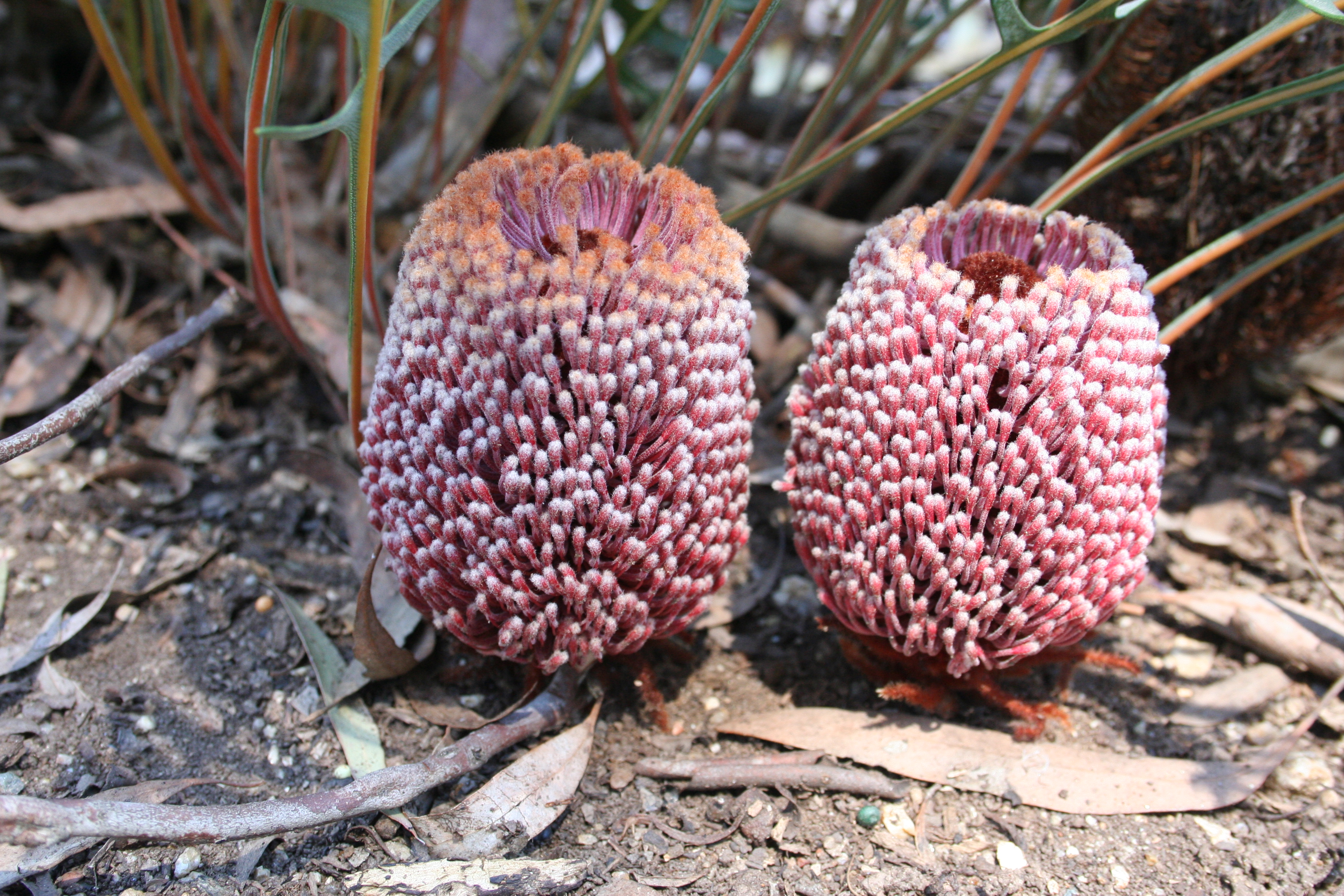
- Flower spikes in late bud, cultivated Australian National Botanic Gardens

Scientific classification
- Kingdom: Plantae
- Clade: Tracheophytes
- Clade: Angiosperms
- Clade: Eudicots
- Order: Proteales
- Family: Proteaceae
- Genus: Banksia
- Subgenus: Banksia subg. Banksia
- Species: B. blechnifolia

Binomial name
- Banksia blechnifolia F.Muell.
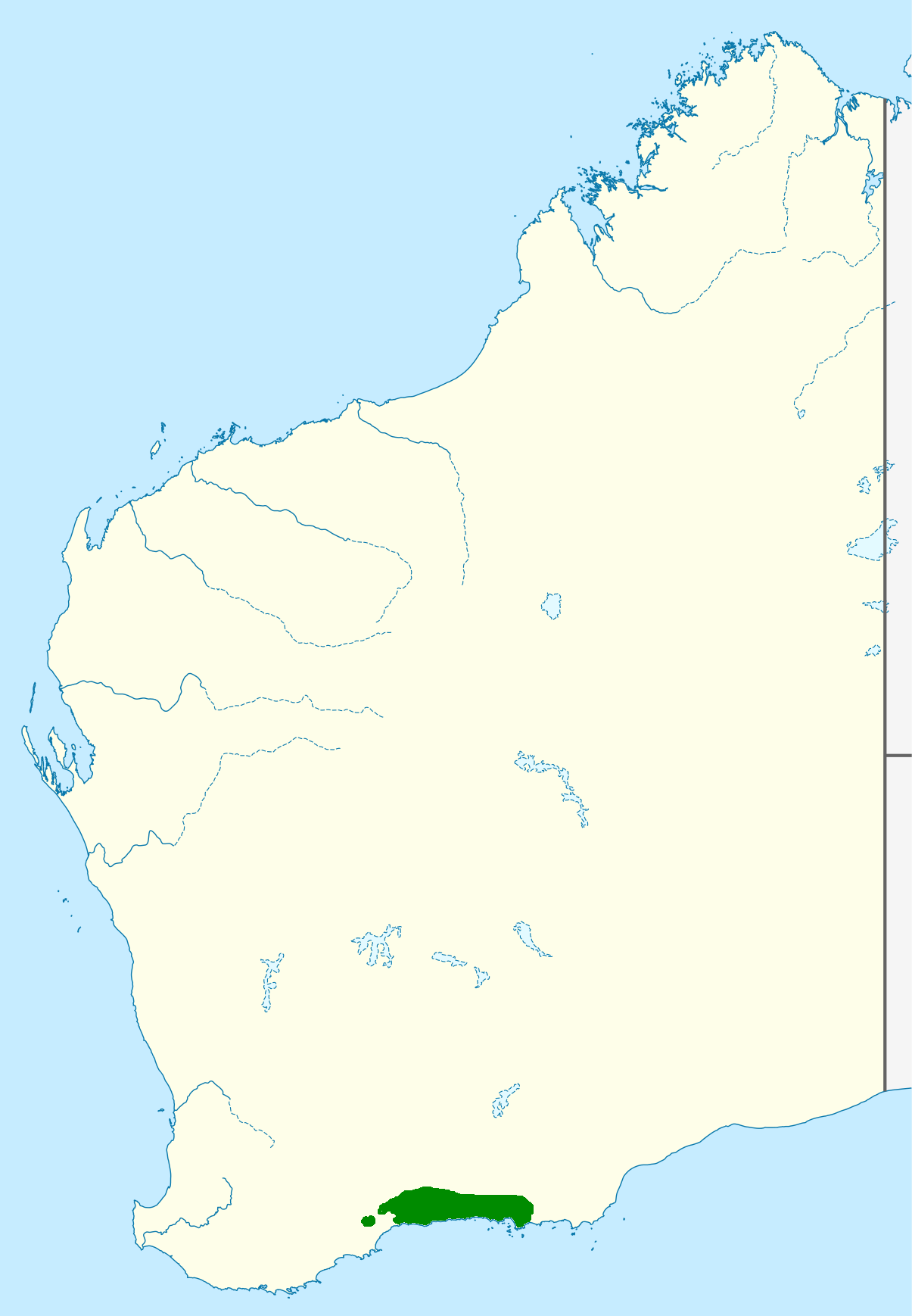
- Range of B. blechnifolia in green

= Banksia blechnifolia =

Species of plant native to Western Australia

Banksia blechnifolia is a species of flowering plant in the genus Banksia found in Western Australia. It was first described by Victorian state botanist Ferdinand von Mueller in 1864, and no subspecies are recognised. It gained its specific name as its leaves are reminiscent of a fern (Blechnum). B. blechnifolia is one of several closely related species that grow as prostrate shrubs, with horizontal stems and leathery, upright leaves. The red-brown flower spikes, known as inflorescences, are up to 20 centimetres (8 in) high and appear from September to November in the Australian spring. As the spikes age, each turns grey and develops as many as 25 woody seed pods, known as follicles.

Insects such as bees, wasps, ants and flies pollinate the flowers. Found in sandy soils in the south coastal region of Western Australia in the vicinity of Lake King, B. blechnifolia is non-lignotuberous, regenerating by seed after bushfire. The plant adapts readily to cultivation, growing in well-drained sandy soils in sunny locations. It is suitable for rockeries and as a groundcover.

== Description ==
Banksia blechnifolia is a prostrate shrub that grows to about 50 cm (19 1/2 in) high and spreads to 2–4 m (6 1/2–13 ft) across. It has thick horizontal stems up to 70 cm (27 1/2 in) long and 0.7–1.0 cm (1/4–3/8 in) thick that lie on top of the ground. They are covered in fine rusty-brown fur, which turns grey with age. The leathery herringbone leaves rise vertically from the stems on thick 5–18 cm (2–7 in) long petioles, which have two narrow ribs on the undersurface. The leaves themselves are 25–45 cm (10–17 1/2 in) long, with 8–22 deep lobes on each leaf edge. Narrowly triangular to roughly linear in shape and 2–5 cm (3/4–2 in) long, these lobes are either oppositely or alternately arranged along the leaf midline, and arise at 60–80 degrees. The leaf blade narrows for the top third of its length to a pointed apex. Flowering occurs from mid September to late November, with the flower spikes, known as inflorescences, arising at the ends of the stems. Up to 20 centimetres (7.9 in) high and 9 centimetres (3.5 in) wide, they are overall red-brown to salmon-coloured. The individual flowers are reddish pink with a cream base, fading to light brown and then grey as they age. The perianth is 2.8–3.2 cm (1 1/8–1 1/4 in) long, includes a 3.5–5 mm limb and is covered in fine fur. Old flowers remain on the spike, obscuring the developing seed pods known as follicles. Up to 25 in number, these are covered in fur and oval, measuring 2.0–3.0 cm (3/4–1 1/8 in) long, by 0.5–1.0 cm (1/4–3/8 in) high, and 1.0–1.5 cm (3/8–5/8 in) wide.

The obovate (egg-shaped) to cuneate (wedge-shaped) seed is 2.0–2.5 cm (3/4–1 in) long. It is composed of the wedge-shaped seed body (containing the embryonic plant), measuring 0.9–1.2 cm (3/8–1/2 in) long by 1.2–1.7 cm (1/2–5/8 in) wide, and a papery wing. One side, termed the outer surface, is convex and pale greyish brown with irregular pits and the inner surface is dark brown and smooth. The seeds are separated by a sturdy dark brown seed separator roughly the same shape as the seeds with a depression where the seed body sits adjacent to it in the follicle. The first pair of leaves produced by seedlings, known as cotyledons, are wedge-shaped with a convex apical side and measure 1.0–1.1 cm (3/8–3/8 in) long by 1.4–1.5 cm (1/2–5/8 in) wide. Dark green in colour, they are faintly reticulated. The auricle at the base of the cotyledon leaf is pointed and measures 0.2 cm (1/8 in) long. The cotyledons sit on a short thick hypocotyl.

== Taxonomy ==
Victorian state botanist Ferdinand von Mueller first recounted Banksia blechnifolia in 1864, from material collected in 1861 by a G. Maxwell. The species name is derived from Blechnum, a genus of fern, and folium "leaf", hence "fern-leaved". Von Mueller held it to be close to B. repens, but in his 1870 arrangement, English botanist George Bentham regarded it as synonymous with that species. Von Mueller wrote of it again in 1869 as a variety of B. repens, giving it the name Banksia pinnatisecta. The species was then mostly forgotten until 1931, when it was collected again by Western Australian botanists William Blackall and Charles Gardner near Middle Mount Barren. As the region was opened up to agriculture, the species was collected more often during the following decades. It was informally known as Banksia sp. "Lake King" during this time and was brought into cultivation. No subspecies are recognized.

In his 1981 monograph The genus Banksia L.f. (Proteaceae), Australian botanist Alex George resurrected B. blechnifolia as a valid species, placing it in B. subgenus Banksia because its inflorescence is a typical Banksia flower spike shape, in B. section Banksia because of its straight styles, and Banksia series Prostratae, because of its prostrate habit, along with five other closely related species. George, like von Mueller, held it to be related to B. repens and B. petiolaris. In 1996, botanists Kevin Thiele and Pauline Ladiges published an arrangement informed by a cladistic analysis of morphological characteristics. This arrangement maintained the species' placement in ser. Prostratae but found the most closely related taxon to be B. chamaephyton, based on their common narrow-lobed leaves, and the next closest relative to be B. repens. George later published an updated version of his 1981 arrangement in his 1999 treatment of Banksia for the Flora of Australia series of monographs. In all three arrangements, section Prostratae is circumscribed with little to no differences, though its placement within the broader system differs. The placement of B. blechnifolia in George's 1999 arrangement may be summarised as follows:

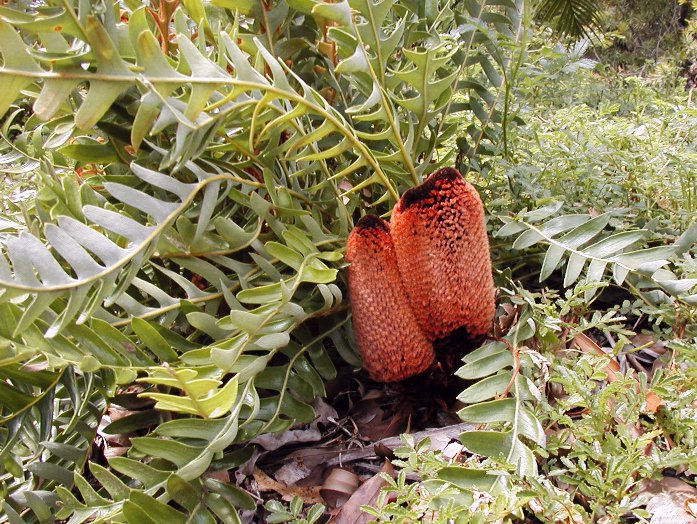
Developing buds

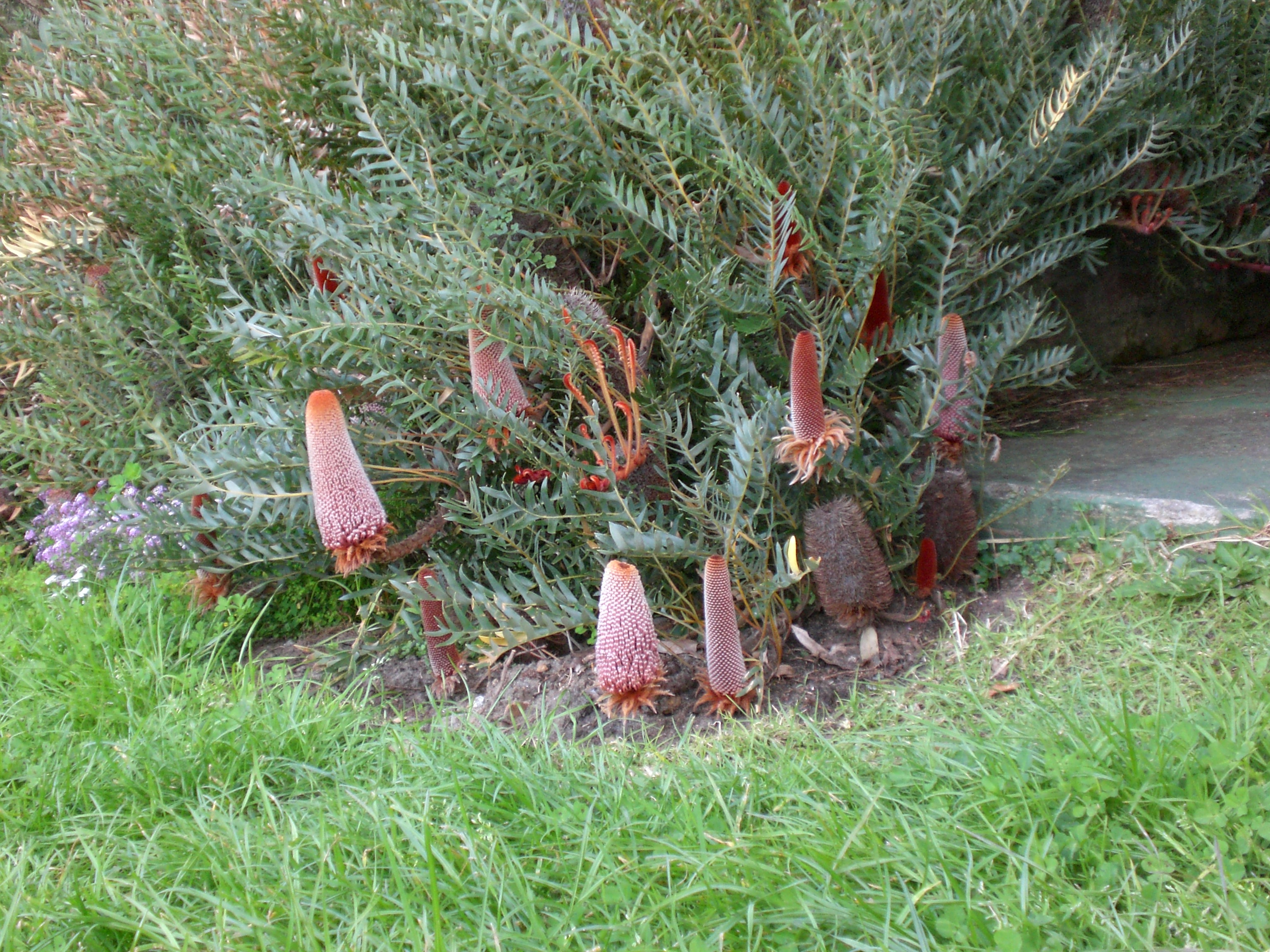
Habit

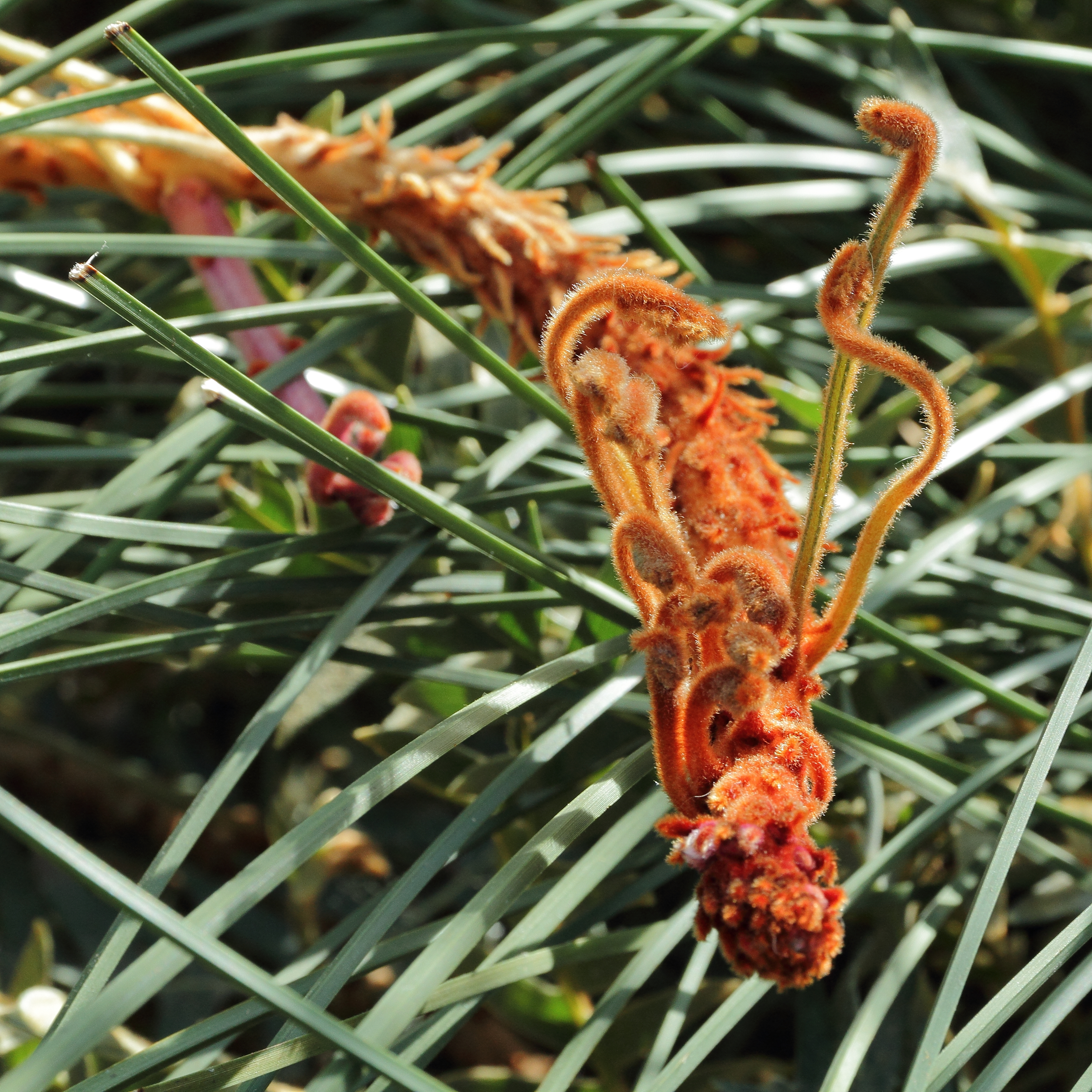
Stems with developing leaves

Banksia

B. subg. Banksia

B. sect. Banksia

B. ser. Salicinae (11 species, 7 subspecies)
B. ser. Grandes (2 species)
B. ser. Banksia (8 species)
B. ser. Crocinae
B. ser. Prostratae (6 species, 3 varieties)

B. goodii
B. gardneri

B. gardneri var. gardneri
B. gardneri var. brevidentata
B. gardneri var. hiemalis

B. chamaephyton
B. repens
B. blechnifolia
B. petiolaris

B. ser. Cyrtostylis (13 species)
B. ser. Tetragonae (3 species)
B. ser. Bauerinae (1 species)
B. ser. Quercinae (2 species)

B. sect. Coccinea (1 species)
B. sect. Oncostylis (4 series, 22 species, 4 subspecies, 11 varieties)

B. subg. Isostylis (3 species)

Since 1998, American botanist Austin Mast has been publishing results of ongoing cladistic analyses of DNA sequence data for the subtribe Banksiinae, which includes Banksia. With respect to B. blechnifolia, Mast's results have some semblance to George and Thiele's, as B. repens, B. chamaephyton and B. blechnifolia form a closely knit group within this group, although the overall inferred phylogeny is very different from George's arrangement. Early in 2007, Mast and Thiele initiated a rearrangement of Banksiinae by publishing several new names, including subgenus Spathulatae for the species of Banksia that have spoon-shaped cotyledons; in this way they also redefined the autonym B. subgenus Banksia. They have not yet published a full arrangement, but if their nomenclatural changes are taken as an interim arrangement, then B. blechnifolia is placed in subgenus Banksia. In a 2013 cladistics study, evolutionary scientists Marcell Cardillo and Renae Pratt found that B. blechnifolia diverged from a lineage that gave rise to B. goodii, B. gardneri and B. repens.

== Distribution and habitat ==
Endemic to Western Australia, B. blechnifolia is found in the state's south between Jerramungup and Gibson, and north towards the vicinity of Lake King. It grows in flat areas, on white sands in kwongan or mallee kwongan communities. It is not found within 10 km (6.2 mi) of the coast.

== Ecology ==
Like many plants in Australia's southwest, Banksia blechnifolia is adapted to an environment in which bushfire events are relatively frequent. Most Banksia species can be placed in one of two broad groups according to their response to fire: reseeders are killed by fire, but fire also triggers the release of their canopy seed bank, thus promoting recruitment of the next generation; resprouters survive fire, resprouting from a lignotuber or, more rarely, epicormic buds protected by thick bark. B. blechnifolia and the related B. petiolaris are in the former category—rapid growing plants killed by bushfire and regenerating by seed—while the other prostrate species are slow growing resprouters.

Like other banksias, B. blechnifolia plays host to a variety of pollinators—insects such as bees, wasps, ants and flies were all recorded in the 1988 The Banksia Atlas survey.

== Cultivation ==
Inoculation experiments found that B. blechnifolia is resistant to dieback. It is one of the Western Australian banksia species that adapts best to cultivation, having been readily grown in eastern states. Rusty new growth and fern-like leaves are its main horticultural features. It requires well-drained soil, preferably fairly sandy, although it can tolerate some clay. Extra water in warm weather can result in vigorous growth. Some specimens reach 4 m (13 ft) diameter in cultivation. It makes an attractive prostrate groundcover, especially in rockeries, though its growth is not dense enough to suppress weeds arising within it. Ample mulching minimises weed growth. It is hardy to moderate frosts.

Seeds do not require any treatment, and take 14 to 49 days to germinate. B. blechnifolia takes 4–5 years to flower from seed in cultivation.
