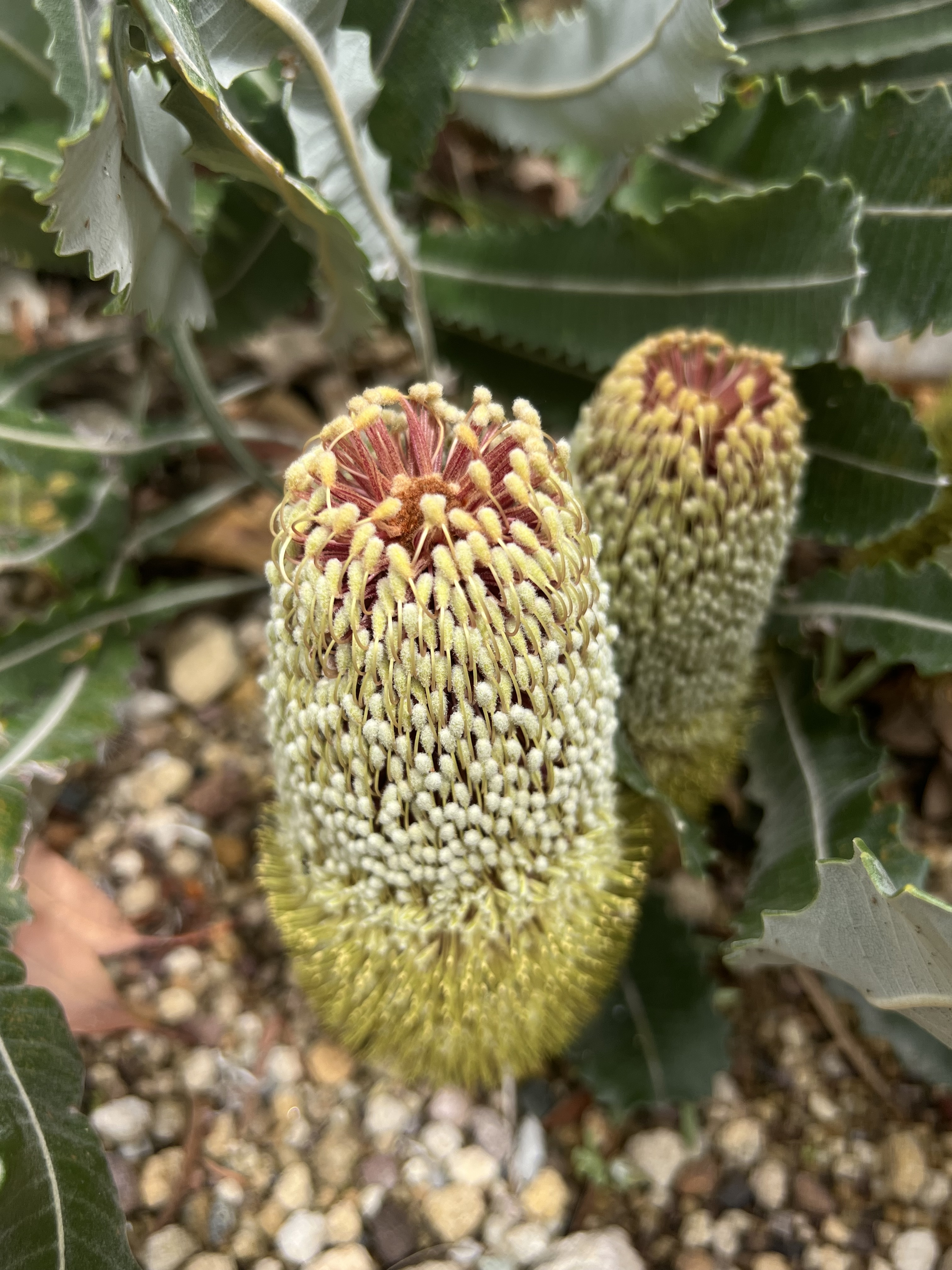

Scientific classification
- Kingdom: Plantae
- Clade: Embryophytes
- Clade: Tracheophytes
- Clade: Angiosperms
- Clade: Eudicots
- Order: Proteales
- Family: Proteaceae
- Genus: Banksia
- Subgenus: Banksia subg. Banksia
- Section: Banksia sect. Banksia
- Series: Banksia ser. Prostratae
- Species: B. petiolaris

Binomial name
- Banksia petiolaris F.Muell.
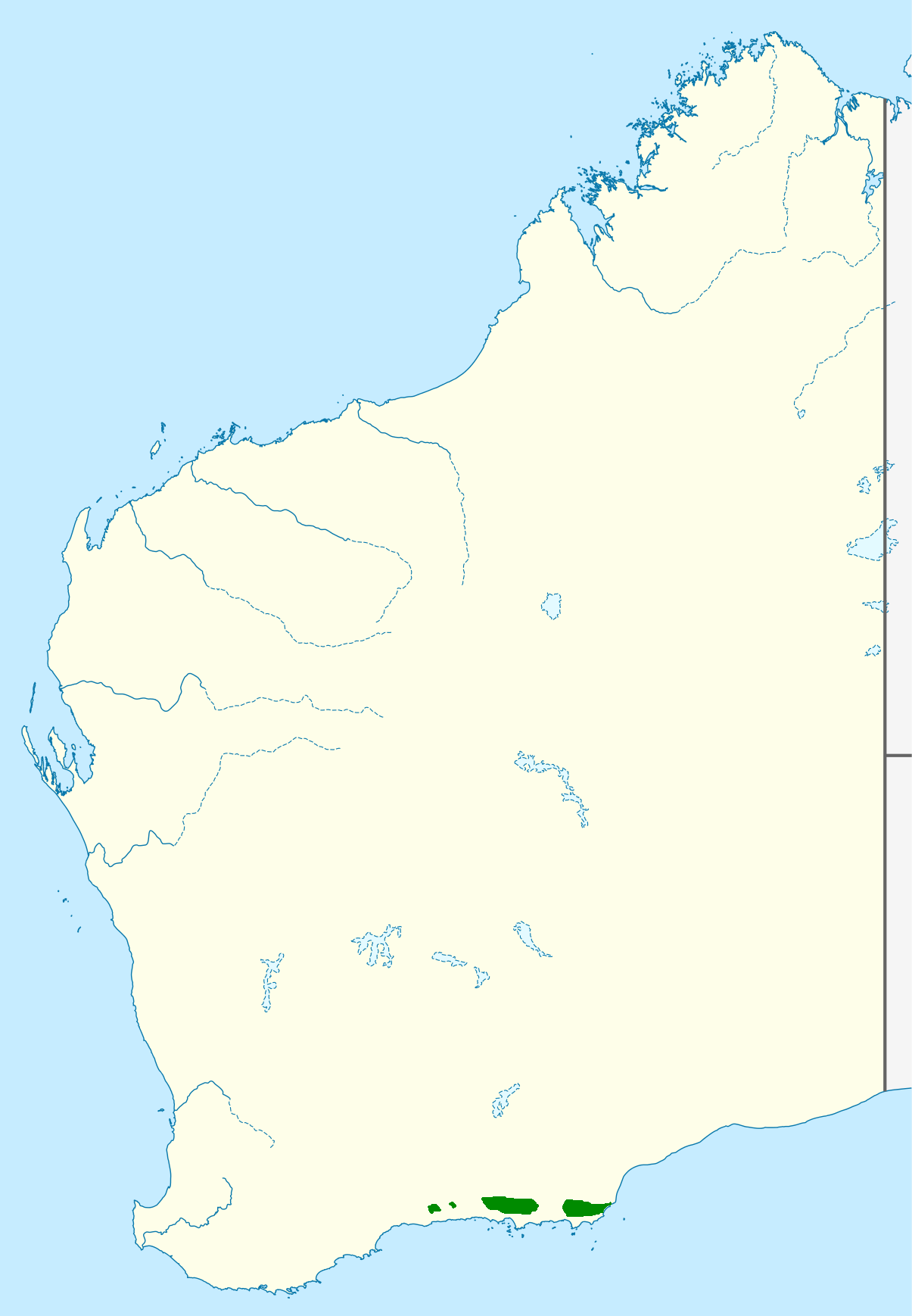
- Range of Banksia petiolaris in green

= Banksia petiolaris =

Species of plant of Western Australia

Banksia petiolaris is a rare species of flowering plant in the family Proteaceae native to Western Australia, where it is found in sandy soils in the south coastal regions from Munglinup east to Israelite Bay. It was first described by Victorian state botanist Ferdinand von Mueller in 1864, and no subspecies are recognised. B. petiolaris is one of several closely related species that will all grow as prostrate shrubs, with horizontal stems and thick, leathery upright leaves. Those of this species can be viable for up to 13 years—the longest-lived of any flowering plant recorded. It bears yellow cylindrical flower spikes, known as inflorescences, up to 16 cm (6 1/4 in) high in spring. As the spikes age, they turn grey and develop up to 20 woody seed pods, known as follicles, each.

Insects such as bees, wasps and even ants can pollinate the flowers. B. petiolaris is nonlignotuberous, meaning it regenerates by seed after bushfire. B. petiolaris adapts readily to cultivation, growing in well-drained sandy soils in sunny locations. It is suitable for rockeries and as a groundcover.

== Description ==
Banksia petiolaris is a prostrate shrub that can spread to a diameter of 2 metres (6 1/2 feet). Its thick stems grow horizontally on the ground and are covered in fine hair. The new growth is more densely covered with velvety orange brown hair. The large, leathery, upright leaves arise vertically on petioles up to 15 cm (6 in) high. The upper surface faces north and is inclined at around 15 degrees off vertical. The leaf blades can reach 60 cm (24 in) in length and 4 cm (1 1/2 in) wide. They are dull green with serrated margins and a white undersurface. Dead leaves remain on the plant. Flowering occurs in late spring. The cylindrical inflorescences are yellow in overall colour and range from 9 to 16 cm (3 1/2 to 6 1/4 in) high. As the flower spikes age, they fade to a greyish colour, the old flowers persisting. Up to 20 woody seed pods, known as follicles, may appear on each spike. Covered with a fine grey fur, they are elliptical in shape and measure 2.8–3.8 cm (1 1/8–1 1/2 in) in length, and 1.5–2 cm (5/8–3/4 in) in width.

The obovate (egg-shaped) seed is 2.5–2.8 cm (1–1 1/8 in) long and fairly flattened. It is composed of the triangular seed body (containing the embryonic plant), measuring 1.0–1.5 cm (3/8–5/8 in) long by 1.4–2.0 cm (1/2–3/4 in) wide, and a papery wing. One side, designated the outer surface, is deeply pitted and the other is brown and smooth. The seeds are separated by a sturdy dark brown seed separator that is roughly the same shape as the seeds with a depression where the seed body sits adjacent to it in the follicle. The first pair of leaves produced by seedlings, known as cotyledons, are cuneate (wedge-shaped) and measure 1.2–1.4 cm (1/2–9/16 in) long by 1.8–2.0 cm (11/16–13/16 in) wide. They are dull-green with a faint net-like pattern. The auricle at the base of the cotyledon leaf is pointed and measures 0.2 cm (1/16 in) long. The first pair of leaves to appear after the cotyledons are 3.5 cm (1 3/8 in) long and oval in shape, with 2–3 lobes or teeth on each side. The next set are 5 cm (2 in) long with 7–10 teeth.

B. petiolaris is fairly uniform across its range, though plants may vary in leaf size. Its yellow flower spikes and white leaf undersurface distinguish it from other prostrate banksias.

== Taxonomy ==
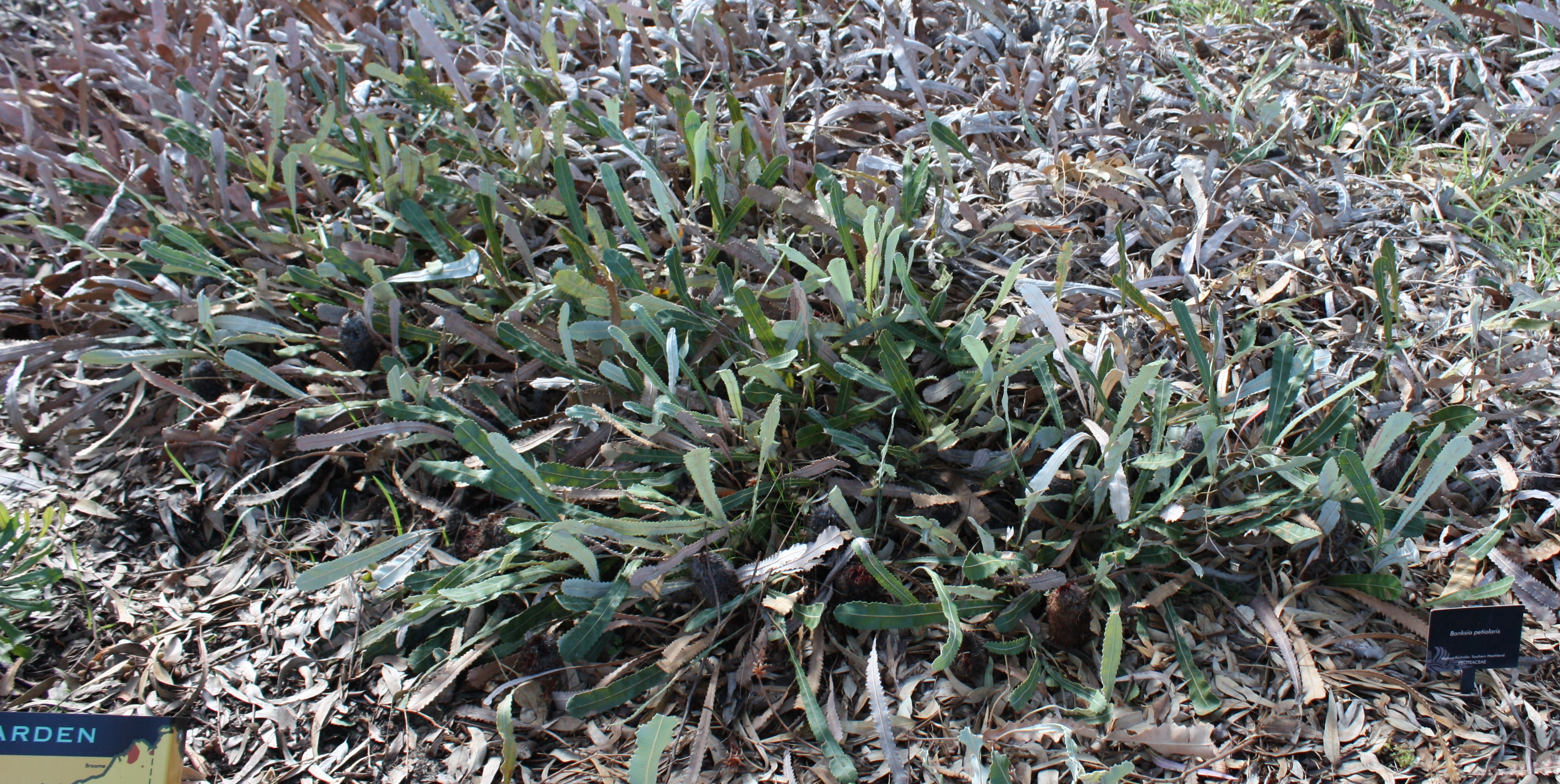
Typical prostrate shrub habit

Banksia petiolaris was first described by Victorian state botanist Ferdinand von Mueller in 1864; its specific name is Latin for "with petioles", referring to the species' long petioles. The type specimen was most likely collected in 1861 by G. Maxwell between Cape Le Grand and Cape Arid and is housed in Melbourne. George Bentham published a thorough revision of Banksia in his landmark publication Flora Australiensis in 1870. In his arrangement, Bentham defined four sections based on leaf, style and pollen-presenter characteristics. B. petiolaris was placed in section Cyrtostylis, a group of species which did not fit easily into one of the other sections. No further subspecies or varieties of B. petiolaris have been described, and it has no taxonomic synonyms. Its only nomenclatural synonym is Sirmuellera petiolaris (F.Muell.) Kuntze, which arose from Otto Kuntze's unsuccessful 1891 attempt to transfer Banksia into the new name Sirmuellera.

In his 1981 monograph on the genus, Australian botanist Alex George placed B. petiolaris in B. subgenus Banksia because its inflorescence is a typical Banksia flower spike shape, in B. section Banksia because of its straight styles, and Banksia series Prostratae, because of its prostrate habit, along with five other closely related species. George held it to be most closely related to B. blechnifolia.

In 1996, botanists Kevin Thiele and Pauline Ladiges published an arrangement informed by a cladistic analysis of morphological characteristics. Their arrangement maintained B. petiolaris in B. subg. Banksia and series Prostratae. They found it to be basal (the earliest offshoot) to the other prostrate banksias. Questioning the emphasis on cladistics in Thiele and Ladiges' arrangement, George published a slightly modified version of his 1981 arrangement in his 1999 treatment of Banksia for the Flora of Australia series of monographs. The placement of B. petiolaris in George's 1999 arrangement may be summarised as follows:

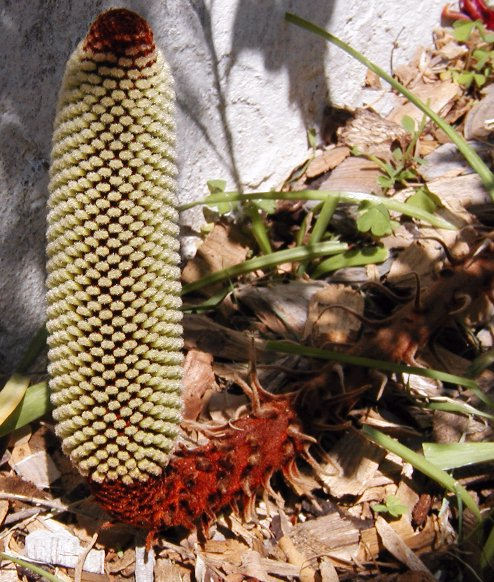
In bud, cultivated in Sydney

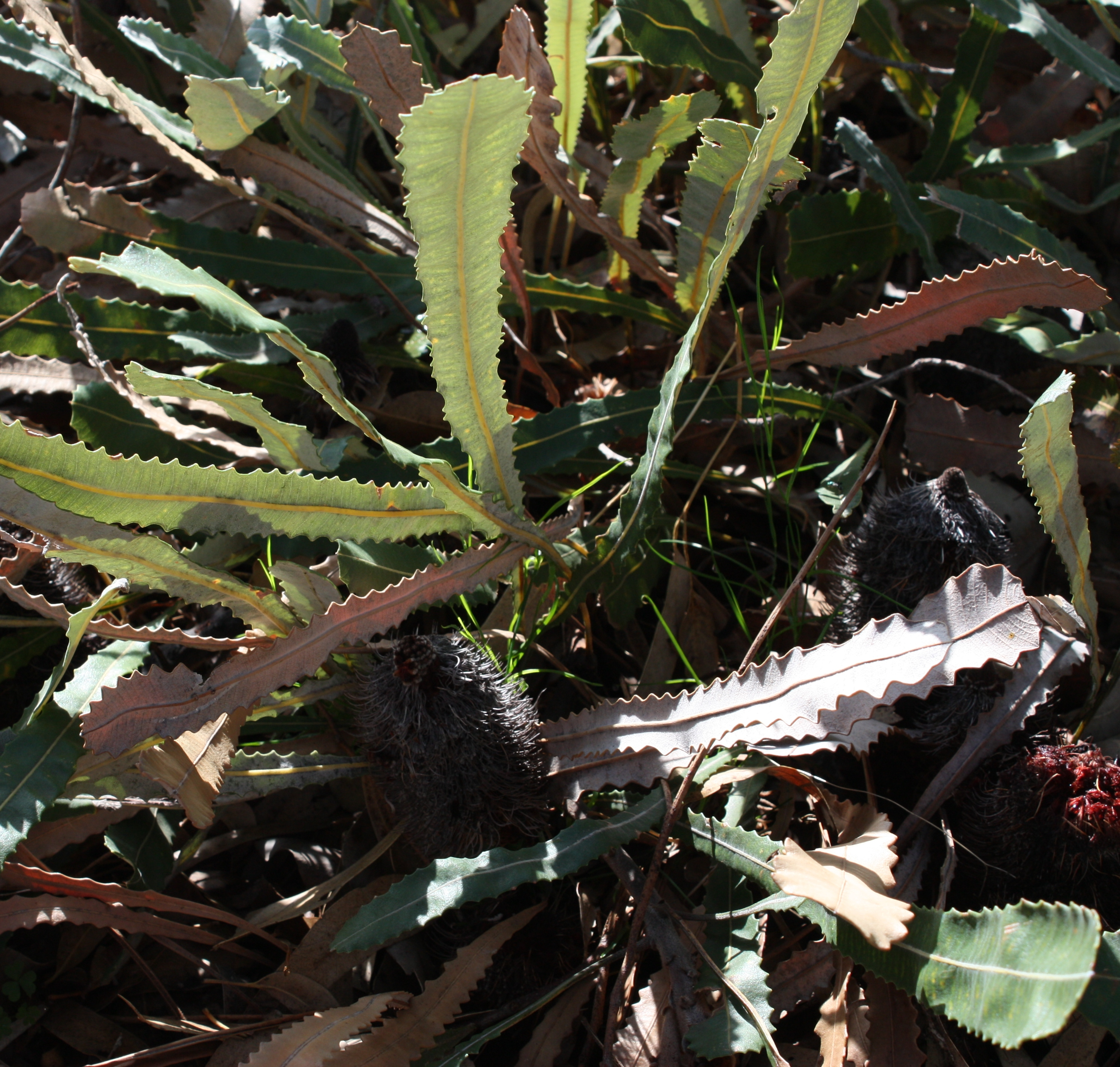
Foliage

Banksia

B. subg. Banksia

B. sect. Banksia

B. ser. Salicinae (11 species, 7 subspecies)
B. ser. Grandes (2 species)
B. ser. Banksia (8 species)
B. ser. Crocinae (4 species)
B. ser. Prostratae

B. goodii
B. gardneri

B. gardneri var. gardneri
B. gardneri var. brevidentata
B. gardneri var. hiemalis

B. chamaephyton
B. repens
B. blechnifolia
B. petiolaris

B. ser. Cyrtostylis (13 species)
B. ser. Tetragonae (3 species)
B. ser. Bauerinae (1 species)
B. ser. Quercinae (2 species)

B. sect. Coccinea (1 species)
B. sect. Oncostylis (4 series, 22 species, 4 subspecies, 11 varieties)

B. subg. Isostylis (3 species)

Since 1998, American botanist Austin Mast has been publishing results of ongoing cladistic analyses of DNA sequence data for the subtribe Banksiinae, which includes Banksia. With respect to B. petiolaris, Mast's results have some semblance to George and Thiele's. It is somewhat basal in a group with the other prostrate species as well as species in series Tetragonae, and B. elderiana, B. baueri, and B. lullfitzii. However, B. repens, B. chamaephyton and B. blechnifolia form a closely knit group within this group, and the overall inferred phylogeny is very different from George's arrangement. Early in 2007, Mast and Thiele initiated a rearrangement of Banksiinae by publishing several new names, including subgenus Spathulatae for the species of Banksia that have spoon-shaped cotyledons; in this way they also redefined the autonym B. subgenus Banksia. They have not yet published a full arrangement, but if their nomenclatural changes are taken as an interim arrangement, then B. petiolaris is placed in subgenus Banksia. In a 2013 cladistics study, evolutionary scientists Marcell Cardillo and Renae Pratt found that its closest relative is B. brevidentata.

== Distribution and habitat ==
Endemic to Western Australia, Banksia petiolaris is found near the state's south coast from the vicinity of Munglinup east to Israelite Bay, concentrated in two disjunct ranges—an eastern one around Cape Arid National Park, and western one east of Scaddan. It is found in white sandy soils in kwongan or mallee heathland, but sometimes occurs with the taller B. speciosa. It is often locally common, with many populations over 100 plants in size.

== Ecology ==
Like many plants in Australia's Southwest, Banksia petiolaris is adapted to an environment in which bushfire events are relatively frequent. Most Banksia species can be placed in one of two broad groups according to their response to fire: reseeders are killed by fire, but fire also triggers the release of their canopy seed bank, thus promoting recruitment of the next generation; resprouters survive fire, resprouting from a lignotuber or, more rarely, epicormic buds protected by thick bark. B. petiolaris and the related B. blechnifolia are in the former category—rapidly growing plants killed by bushfire and regenerating by seed—while the other prostrate species are slow growing resprouters.

Like other banksias, B. petiolaris plays host to a variety of pollinators—insects such as bees, wasps and ants were all recorded in the 1988 The Banksia Atlas survey.

An assessment of the potential impact of climate change on this species found that its range is likely to contract by between 30% and 80% by 2080, depending on the severity of the change. Many of its western populations are found on road verges, rendering them vulnerable to resurfacing or widening of roadways. It does, however, show little susceptibility to the soil-borne water mould Phytophthora cinnamomi, unlike many Western Australian banksias.

Banksia petiolaris has the longest-lived leaves of any flowering plant so far recorded—a study published in 1992 recorded a lifespan of up to 13 years for a single leaf, while leaves of 10 years of age ably maintained their ability to photosynthesize compared with young leaves. The authors concluded that leaf longevity is advantageous in plants in nutrient-poor soils, as the loss of valuable nutrients in leaf loss is minimised (the leaves store much of a plant's nutrients).

== Cultivation ==
B. petiolaris is grown fairly commonly in Australian gardens, making an attractive prostrate groundcover or rockery plant. It can also be grown on embankments to reduce soil erosion. Although somewhat resistant to dieback, it does require a well-drained soil, preferably fairly sandy. Like other banksias, it grows best in full sun. It is tolerant of alkaline soils, with one cultivated specimen recorded tolerating a pH of 9.5. Seeds do not require any treatment, and take about 18 to 49 days to germinate.
