= The genus Banksia L.f. (Proteaceae) =

1981 taxonomic monograph by Alex George

- Author: Alex George
- Language: English
- Genre: Non-fiction
- Publisher: Western Australian Herbarium
- Publication date: 1981
- Publication place: Australia

"The genus Banksia L.f. (Proteaceae)" is a 1981 monograph by Alex George on the taxonomy of the plant genus Banksia. Published by the Western Australian Herbarium as Nuytsia 3(3), it presented George's taxonomic arrangement of Banksia, the first major taxonomic revision of the genus since George Bentham published his arrangement in Flora Australiensis in 1870.

One of the most important contributions of "The genus Banksia L.f. (Proteaceae)" was the publication of ten new species and nine new varieties of Banksia. These were:

- B. aculeata (Prickly Banksia)
- B. chamaephyton (fishbone banksia)
- B. conferta (Glasshouse Banksia) (and therefore also the autonym B. conferta var. conferta, now B. conferta subsp. conferta)
- B. conferta var. penicillata (now B. conferta subsp. penicillata)
- B. cuneata (Matchstick Banksia)
- B. ericifolia var. macrantha (now B. ericifolia subsp. macrantha)
- B. gardneri var. brevidentata
- B. gardneri var. hiemalis
- B. grossa (Coarse Banksia)
- B. integrifolia var. aquilonia (now B. aquilonia)
- B. lanata (Coomallo Banksia)
- B. littoralis var. seminuda (now B. seminuda)
- B. meisneri var. ascendens (now B. meisneri subsp. ascendens)
- B. micrantha
- B. nutans var. cernuella
- B. plagiocarpa (Dallachy's Banksia)
- B. saxicola (Grampians Banksia)
- B. scabrella (Burma Road Banksia)
- B. sphaerocarpa var. caesia
- B. sphaerocarpa var. dolichostyla
- B. telmatiaea (Swamp Fox Banksia)

In addition, B. sphaerocarpa var. glabrescens was redescribed as B. incana, and B. quercifolia var. integrifolia was redescribed as B. oreophila. B. collina was demoted to B. spinulosa var. collina, and B. cunninghamii was demoted to B. spinulosa var. cunninghamii.

George further proposed a new infrageneric classification for Banksia, redefining some of the existing sections, demoting Bentham's B. sect. Cyrtostylis and B. sect. Orthostylis to B. ser. Cyrtostylis and B. ser. Orthostylis (now B. ser. Banksia) respectively, and publishing six new series:

- B. ser. Coccinea (now B. sect. Coccinea)
- B. ser. Grandes
- B. ser. Tetragonae
- B. ser. Spicigerae
- B. ser. Prostratae
- B. ser. Crocinae

The classification was widely accepted, and is essentially the one that is in use today.

Finally, having examined historical specimens at the Royal Botanic Gardens, Kew and elsewhere, George published lectotypes for most pre-existing Banksia taxa.
