= Mountain banksia =

Mountain banksia may refer to:

- Banksia canei
- Banksia oreophila
