= Bentham's taxonomic arrangement of Banksia =

1870 arrangement of the Australian endemic plant genus Banksia

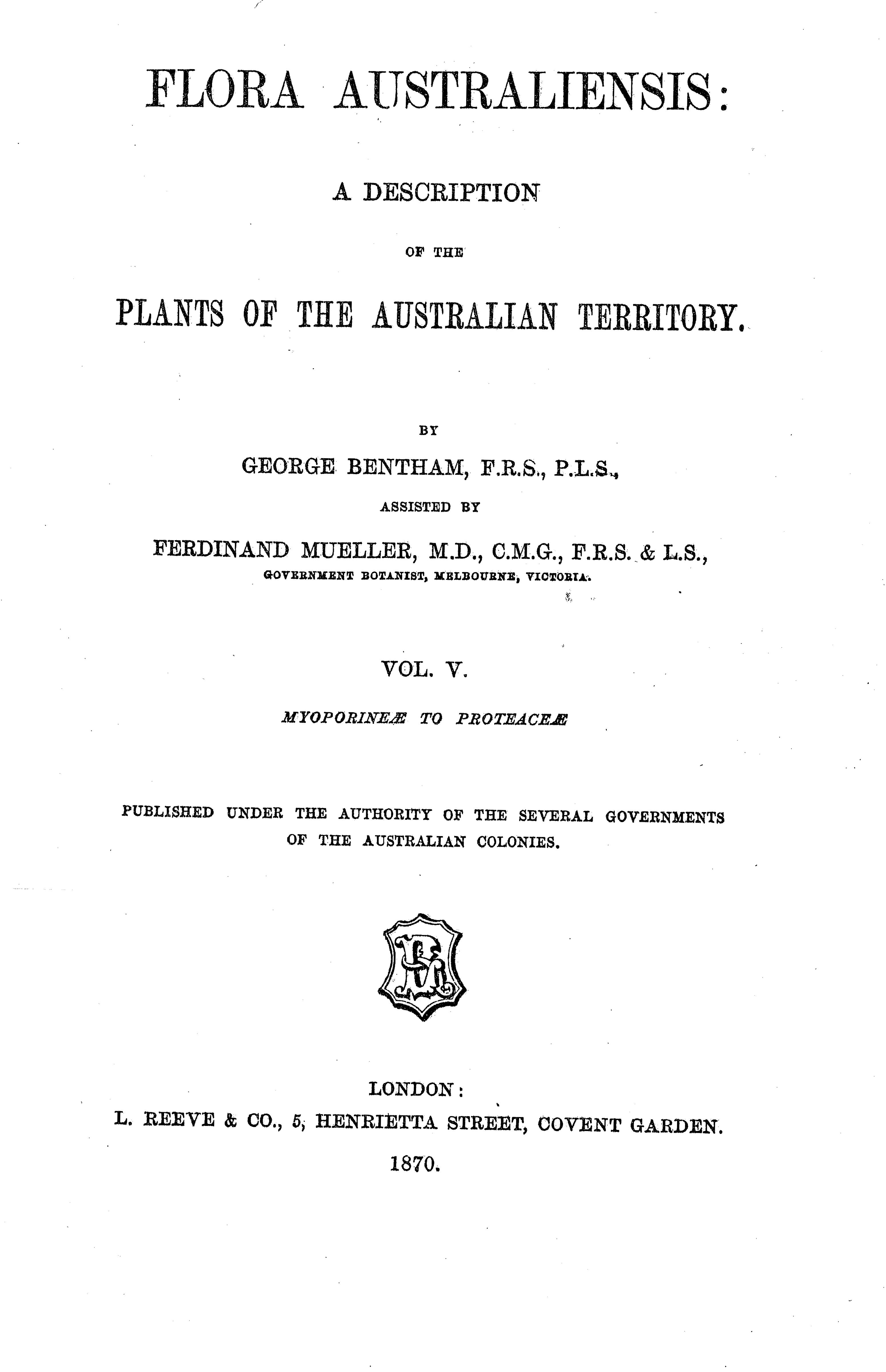
George Bentham's taxonomic arrangement of Banksia was first published in Volume V of Flora Australiensis.

George Bentham's taxonomic arrangement of Banksia was published in 1870, in Volume 5 of Bentham's Flora Australiensis. A substantial improvement on the previous arrangement, it would stand for over a century. It was eventually replaced by Alex George's 1981 arrangement, published in his classic monograph The genus Banksia L.f. (Proteaceae).

== Background ==
Banksia is a genus of around 80 species in the plant family Proteaceae. An iconic Australian wildflower and popular garden plant, they are easily recognised by their characteristic flower spikes and fruiting "cones". They grow in forms varying from prostrate woody shrubs to trees up to 35 metres tall, and occur in all but the most arid areas of Australia. As heavy producers of nectar, they are important sources of food for nectariferous animals such as honeyeaters and honey possum, and they are of economic importance to the nursery and cut flower industries. However they are seriously threatened by a number of processes including land clearing, frequent burning, and disease, and a number of species are rare and endangered.

Specimens of Banksia were first collected by Sir Joseph Banks and Dr Daniel Solander, naturalists on HM Bark Endeavour during Lieutenant (later Captain) James Cook's 1770 voyage to the Pacific Ocean. By the time of Bentham's arrangement, 60 species were recognised. The most recent taxonomic arrangement, which had stood since 1856, was that of Carl Meissner. Meissner's arrangement divided the genus into two sections, with B. ilicifolia placed alone in section Isostylis because of its unusual dome-shaped inflorescences, and all other species in section Eubanksia. The latter section was divided into four series, which were based on leaf properties and were highly heterogeneous.

== Bentham's arrangement ==
As Bentham never visited Australia, he only had access to preserved specimens. Thus he was unable to distinguish between some similar pairs of species, and so reduced the number of species to 46. He retained Isostylis, but replaced Meissner's four series by four sections based on leaf, style and pollen-presenter characters. Two of these, Oncostylis and Eubanksia, were reasonably well-defined and homogeneous; section Orthostylis was somewhat heterogeneous; section Cyrtostylis was erected to contain the species that did not belong in the other sections, and was therefore highly heterogeneous.

George Bentham's 1870 taxonomic arrangement of Banksia may be summarised as follows:

Banksia

B. sect. Oncostylis

B. pulchella
B. Meissneri
B. nutans
B. sphærocarpa

B. sphaerocarpa var. glabrescens (now B. incana)
B. sphaerocarpa var. latifolia (now B. sphaerocarpa var. sphaerocarpa)

B. tricuspis
B. occidentalis
B. littoralis
B. ericifolia
B. spinulosa
B. collina (now B. spinulosa var. collina)
B. verticillata
B. dryandroides
B. Brownii

B. sect. Cyrtostylis

B. attenuata
B. media
B. Solandri
B. Goodii
B. petiolaris
B. repens
B. prostrata (now B. gardneri)
B. grandis
B. quercifolia

B. quercifolia var. integrifolia (now B. oreophila)

B. Baueri

B. sect. Eubanksia

B. marginata
B. integrifolia
B. dentata

B. sect. Orthostylis

B. latifolia (now B. robur)
B. serrata
B. æmula
B. ornata
B. coccinea
B. sceptrum
B. Menziesii
B. lævigata
B. Hookeriana
B. prionotes
B. Victoriæ
B. speciosa
B. Baxteri
B. marcescens (now B. praemorsa)
B. Lemanniana
B. Caleyi
B. Lindleyana
B. elegans
B. Candolleana

B. sect. Isostylis

B. ilicifolia

B. ilicifolia var. integrifolia (now B. ilicifolia)

== Results ==
Despite some shortcomings, Bentham's arrangement remained current for over a hundred years. It was only superseded in 1981, with the publication of Alex George's arrangement in his landmark monograph The genus Banksia L.f. (Proteaceae).

Many of the species that Bentham discarded have now been reinstated. Section Isostylis is now maintained at subgenus level as Banksia subg. Isostylis. Sections Oncostylis and Eubanksia are still maintained, but Eubanksia has been renamed Banksia sect. Banksia in accordance with the International Code of Botanical Nomenclature. The other sections are no longer maintained.
