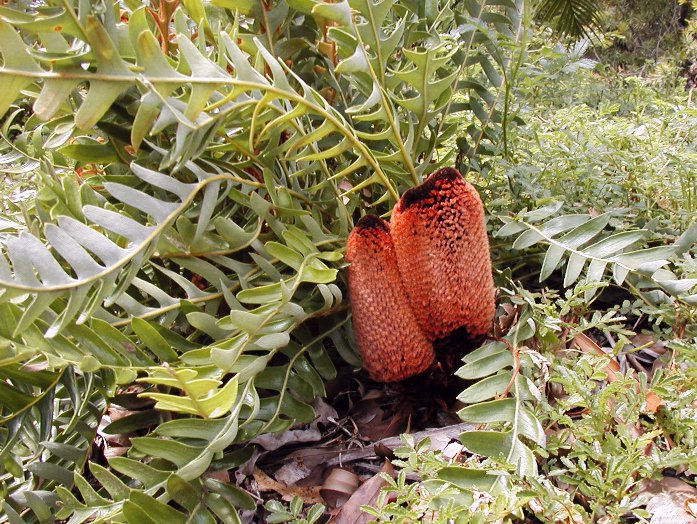
- Banksia blechnifolia, a member of series Prostratae

Scientific classification
- Kingdom: Plantae
- Clade: Tracheophytes
- Clade: Angiosperms
- Clade: Eudicots
- Order: Proteales
- Family: Proteaceae
- Genus: Banksia
- Subgenus: Banksia subg. Banksia
- Section: Banksia sect. Banksia
- Series: Banksia ser. Prostratae; A.S.George

Species
- See text

= Banksia ser. Prostratae =

Taxonomic series of Australian plants

Banksia ser. Prostratae is a taxonomic series in the genus Banksia, a genus of iconic Australian wildflowers. It consists of six closely related species in section Banksia, all endemic to Western Australia, with a prostrate habit.

== Species ==
Banksia ser. Prostratae consists of the following species:

Image	Scientific name	Common name	Distribution
	B. goodii	Good's banksia	southwest Western Australia between Albany and the Porongorup Range.
	B. gardneri	prostrate banksia	between Cranbrook, Ravensthorpe, Harrismith and the south coast of Western Australia.
	B. chaephyton	fishbone banksia	kwongan between Eneabba and Mogumber.
	B. blechnifolia		south between Jerramungup and Gibson, and north towards the vicinity of Lake King
	B. repens	creeping banksia	Cranbrook to Israelite Bay, on the Western Australian
	B. petiolaris		Munglinup east to Israelite Bay
