= The Banksia Atlas =

Book that documents plants of the genus Banksia

The first edition of The Banksia Atlas

The second edition of The Banksia Atlas

The Banksia Atlas is an atlas that documents the ranges, habitats and growth forms of various species and other subgeneric taxa of Banksia, an iconic Australian wildflower genus. First published in 1988, it was the result of a three-year nationwide program involving over 400 amateur and professional volunteers.

== History ==
The Banksia Atlas project was modelled on the Atlas of Australian Birds project, a citizen science project that has mobilised over 7,000 volunteers to collect bird sighting data since 1978. While the Atlas project was underway, Dr Stephen Hopper became interested in establishing similar projects for mapping the Australian flora. Between 1979 and 1983, Hopper ran two pilot projects, testing the use of volunteers and computer mapping for the recording of sightings of kangaroo paw and various orchids of Western Australia. In 1983 he was approached by the Australian Biological Resources Study (ABRS), who wished to pilot a nationwide distribution study of a significant plant genus. The genus Banksia was chosen as a high-profile, widely distributed genus that was easily identified, but for which distribution and habitat were poorly known.

Funded by the ABRS and the Department of Conservation and Land Management, the project started in February 1984 and went public in July. Data was collected for over two years, during which time over 25,000 records of taxa were received from over 400 volunteers.

As a result of The Banksia Atlas project, two new species, B. epica and B. oligantha (Wagin banksia), were discovered in Western Australia, new varieties of B. oblongifolia (fern-leaved banksia), B. occidentalis (red swamp banksia), B. seminuda (river banksia) and B. spinulosa (hairpin banksia) were recognised, and a cultivar of B. serrata (saw banksia), Banksia 'Superman', was registered. A number of hybrids were recorded for the first time, and some rare flower colour variants were noted. Knowledge of distribution was increased for virtually every species, with the range extended to significant new locations for around 40 species. Previously unknown populations were discovered for a number of rare Banksia species, adding to the knowledge of the conservation status of these species. For example, B. chamaephyton (fishbone banksia) was struck off the list of declared rare plants as a result of knowledge gained during The Banksia Atlas project.

Edited by Anne Taylor and Stephen Hopper and published by the Australian Government Publishing Service, The Banksia Atlas was first published in 1988 and reprinted with amendments in 1991. It presents distribution information for 75 species, 1 subspecies and 14 varieties of Banksia. For each taxon the Atlas provides an illustration and brief discussion. A distribution map is provided, along with a breakdown of observation data showing population sizes, growth forms, habitat types, response to fire, flowering times, and observed pollinators.
