= Banksia gardneri var. gardneri =

Scientific classification
- Kingdom: Plantae
- Clade: Tracheophytes
- Clade: Angiosperms
- Clade: Eudicots
- Order: Proteales
- Family: Proteaceae
- Genus: Banksia
- Species: B. gardneri A.S.George
- Variety: B. g. var. gardneri

Trinomial name
- Banksia gardneri var. gardneri

Variety of prostrate shrub

Banksia gardneri var. gardneri is a variety of Banksia gardneri. As an autonym, it is defined as encompassing the type material of the species. It is native to the Southwest Botanical Province of Western Australia.

== Use in horticulture ==
Banksia gardneri gardneri is a slow growing shrub though fairly easy to grow. It is less vigorous than Banksia blechnifolia or B. petiolaris. Seeds do not require any treatment, and take 19 to 64 days to germinate.
