= Banksia meisneri subsp. ascendens =

Scientific classification
- Kingdom: Plantae
- Clade: Tracheophytes
- Clade: Angiosperms
- Clade: Eudicots
- Order: Proteales
- Family: Proteaceae
- Genus: Banksia
- Species: B. meisneri
- Subspecies: B. m. subsp. ascendens

Trinomial name
- Banksia meisneri subsp. ascendens A.S.George

Subspecies of plant

Banksia meisneri subsp. ascendens, commonly known as Scott River banksia, is a subspecies of Banksia meisneri. It is native to the Southwest Botanical Province of Western Australia.
