= Banksia ericifolia subsp. macrantha =

Scientific classification
- Kingdom: Plantae
- Clade: Tracheophytes
- Clade: Angiosperms
- Clade: Eudicots
- Order: Proteales
- Family: Proteaceae
- Genus: Banksia
- Species: B. ericifolia
- Subspecies: B. e. subsp. macrantha

Trinomial name
- Banksia ericifolia subsp. macrantha A.S.George

Subspecies of plant native to Australia

Banksia ericifolia subsp. macrantha is a subspecies of Banksia ericifolia. It is native to New South Wales.
