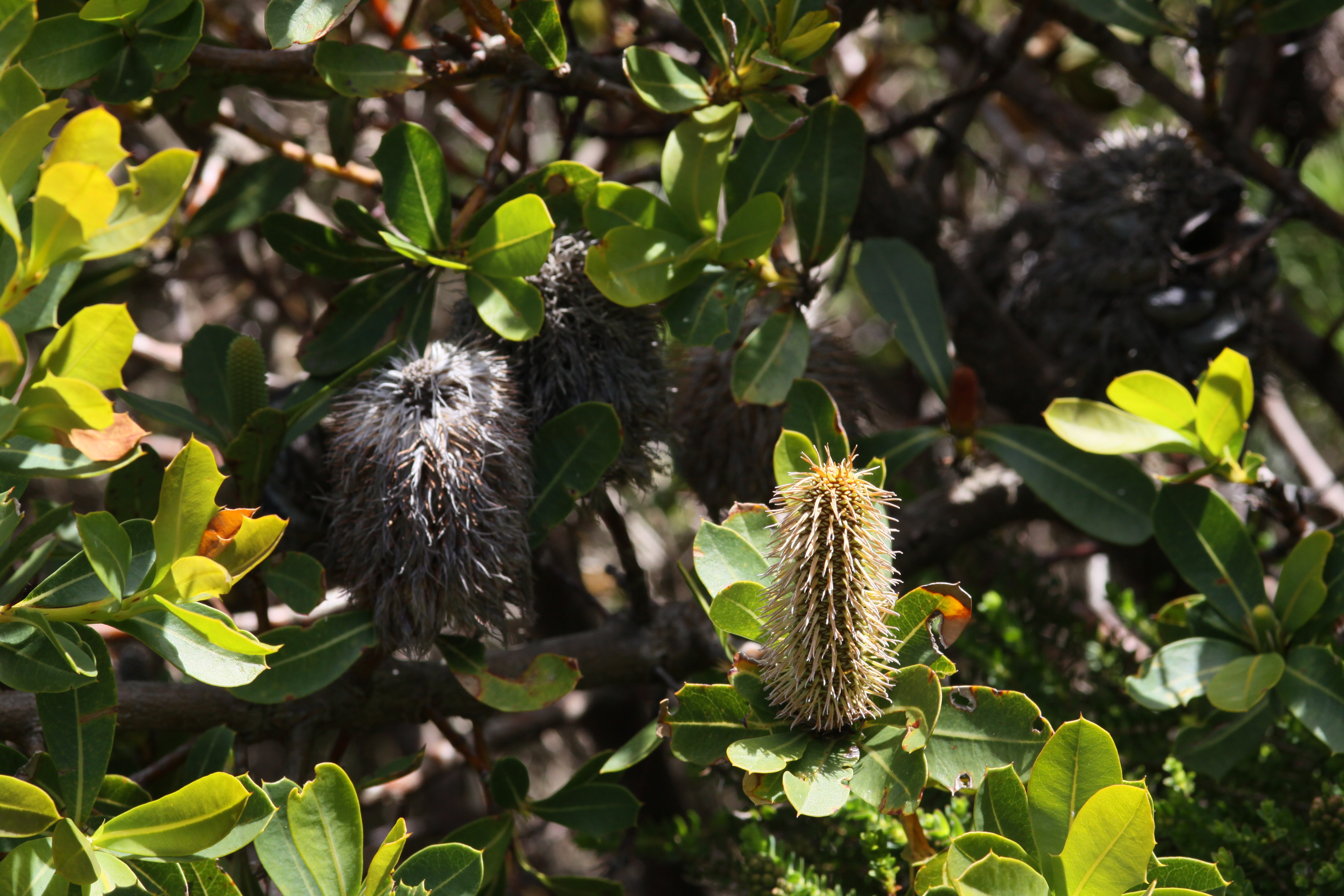
- Banksia oreophila on Bluff Knoll

Scientific classification
- Kingdom: Plantae
- Clade: Tracheophytes
- Clade: Angiosperms
- Clade: Eudicots
- Order: Proteales
- Family: Proteaceae
- Genus: Banksia
- Subgenus: Banksia subg. Banksia
- Species: B. oreophila

Binomial name
- Banksia oreophila A.S.George

Synonyms
- Banksia quercifolia var. integrifolia F.Muell.

= Banksia oreophila =

Western mountain banksia

Species of shrub endemic to Western Australia

Banksia oreophila, commonly known as the western mountain banksia or mountain banksia, is a species of shrub that is endemic to the south-west of Western Australia. It has glabrous stems, wedge-shaped or narrow egg-shaped leaves with the narrower end towards the base, cylindrical spikes of pale pink to mauve flowers and later, up to twenty follicles in each spike, surrounded by the remains of the flowers. It occurs on slopes and hilltops in the Stirling and Barren Ranges.

== Description ==
Banksia oreophila is a shrub that typically grows to a height of 0.5–3 m (1 ft 8 in – 9 ft 10 in) but does not form a lignotuber. It has smooth grey or pale brown bark. The leaves are wedge-shaped to narrow egg-shaped with the narrower end towards the base, 20–110 mm (0.79–4.33 in) long and 5–25 mm (0.20–0.98 in) wide on a petiole 2–4 mm (0.079–0.157 in) long. The edges of the leaves are only sparsely serrated, if at all. The flowers are pale mauve to pink and arranged in a cylindrical spike 20–90 mm (0.79–3.54 in) long and 40–55 mm (1.6–2.2 in) wide when the flowers open. There are tapering involucral bracts 5–10 mm (0.20–0.39 in) long at the base of the spike. The perianth is 20–29 mm (0.79–1.14 in) long and the pistil 15–21 mm (0.59–0.83 in) long and wiry. Flowering occurs from June to July and there are up to twenty elliptic to oblong follicles 20–28 mm (0.79–1.10 in) long, 10–18 mm (0.39–0.71 in) wide in each spike, surrounded by the remains of the old flowers.

== Taxonomy ==
This banksia was first formally described in 1869 by Ferdinand von Mueller in Fragmenta phytographiae Australiae and was given the name Banksia quercifolia var. integrifolia. In 1981, Alex George promoted it to species rank, however, as there was already a plant named Banksia integrifolia (coast banksia), George chose the name Banksia oreophila, from Greek words meaning "mountain-loving", referring to the habitat of this banksia.

George placed B. oreophila in subgenus Banksia, section Banksia, series Quercinae.

== Distribution and habitat ==
Banksia oreophila grows in rocky places in low heath or shrubland, mostly on the upper slopes and summits of the Stirling Range and Barrens.

== Conservation status ==
This banksia is listed as "not threatened" by the Western Australian Government Department of Parks and Wildlife.

== Use in horticulture ==
Seeds do not require any treatment, and take 23 to 27 days to germinate.
