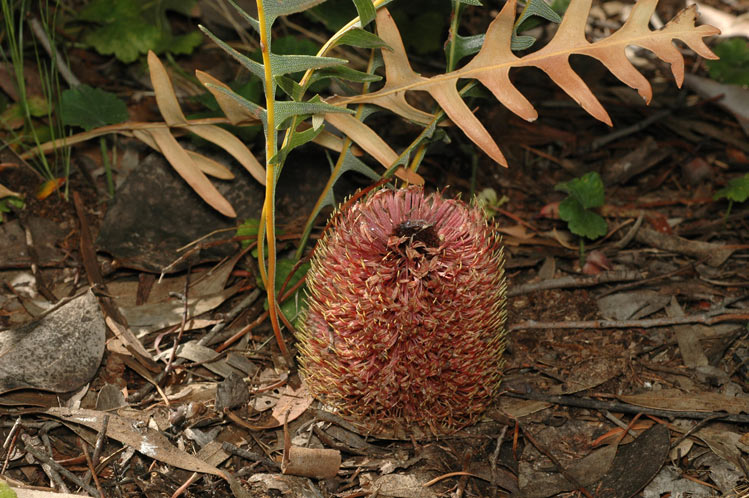
- Banksia gardneri in the ANBG

Conservation status
- Near Threatened (IUCN 3.1)

Scientific classification
- Kingdom: Plantae
- Clade: Tracheophytes
- Clade: Angiosperms
- Clade: Eudicots
- Order: Proteales
- Family: Proteaceae
- Genus: Banksia
- Subgenus: Banksia subg. Banksia
- Section: Banksia sect. Banksia
- Series: Banksia ser. Prostratae
- Species: B. gardneri

Binomial name
- Banksia gardneri A.S.George

Synonyms
- Banksia prostrata R.Br. nom. illeg.; Sermuellera prostrata Kuntze

= Banksia gardneri =

Prostrate banksia

Species of shrub endemic to Western Australia

Banksia gardneri, commonly known as prostrate banksia, is a species of prostrate shrub that is endemic to Western Australia. It has pinnatipartite or serrated leaves, usually rusty brown flowers, and up to twenty-five elliptical follicles in each fruiting head. It occurs along the west part of the south coast of the state.

== Description ==
Banksia gardneri is a prostrate shrub that forms a lignotuber and has hairy stems that usually lie on the surface. Its leaves are pinnatipartite or serrated, 100–280 mm (3.9–11.0 in) long and 20–60 mm (0.79–2.36 in) wide on a petiole 40–120 mm (1.6–4.7 in) long, the lobes on the sides triangular to oblong. The flowers are borne on a head 35–100 mm (1.4–3.9 in) long and 40–60 mm (1.6–2.4 in) wide when the flowers open, with hairy involucral bracts 10–30 mm (0.39–1.18 in) long at the base of the head. The flowers are usually rusty brown with a cream-coloured style. The perianth is 17–26 mm (0.67–1.02 in) long and the pistil 18–30 mm (0.71–1.18 in) long. Flowering occurs from April to November and up to twenty-five densely hairy, elliptical follicles 23–40 mm (0.91–1.57 in) long, 5–20 mm (0.20–0.79 in) high and 8–15 mm (0.31–0.59 in) wide form in each head.

== Taxonomy and naming ==
Prostrate banksia was first formally described in 1830 by Robert Brown who gave it the name Banksia prostrata, but the name was illegitimate because it was already in use (Banksia prostrata J.R.Forst. & G.Forst.) for a New Zealand endemic now known as Pimelea prostrata (J.R.Forst. & G.Forst.) Lam. In 1981, Alex George described the species in the journal Nuytsia, giving it the name Banksia gardneri. The specific epithet honours Charles Gardner, the Government Botanist of Western Australia from 1929 to 1960.

In the same journal, George described three varieties and the names are accepted by the Australian Plant Census:

- Banksia gardneri var. brevidentata that has serrated leaves;
- Banksia gardneri var. gardneri that has pinnatipartite leaves and rusty brown flowers mainly in spring;
- Banksia gardneri var. hiemalis that has pinnatipartite leaves and pale pink and pale brown flowers, mainly in winter.

== Distribution and habitat ==
Banksia gardneri grows in shrubland, low woodland and kwongan, mainly between Cranbrook, Ravensthorpe, Harrismith and the south coast of Western Australia.

== Conservation status ==
This banksia is classified as "not threatened" by the Western Australian Government Department of Parks and Wildlife.

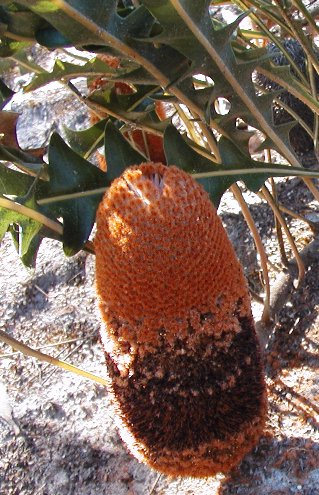
Flowers with unusual black styles near Albany

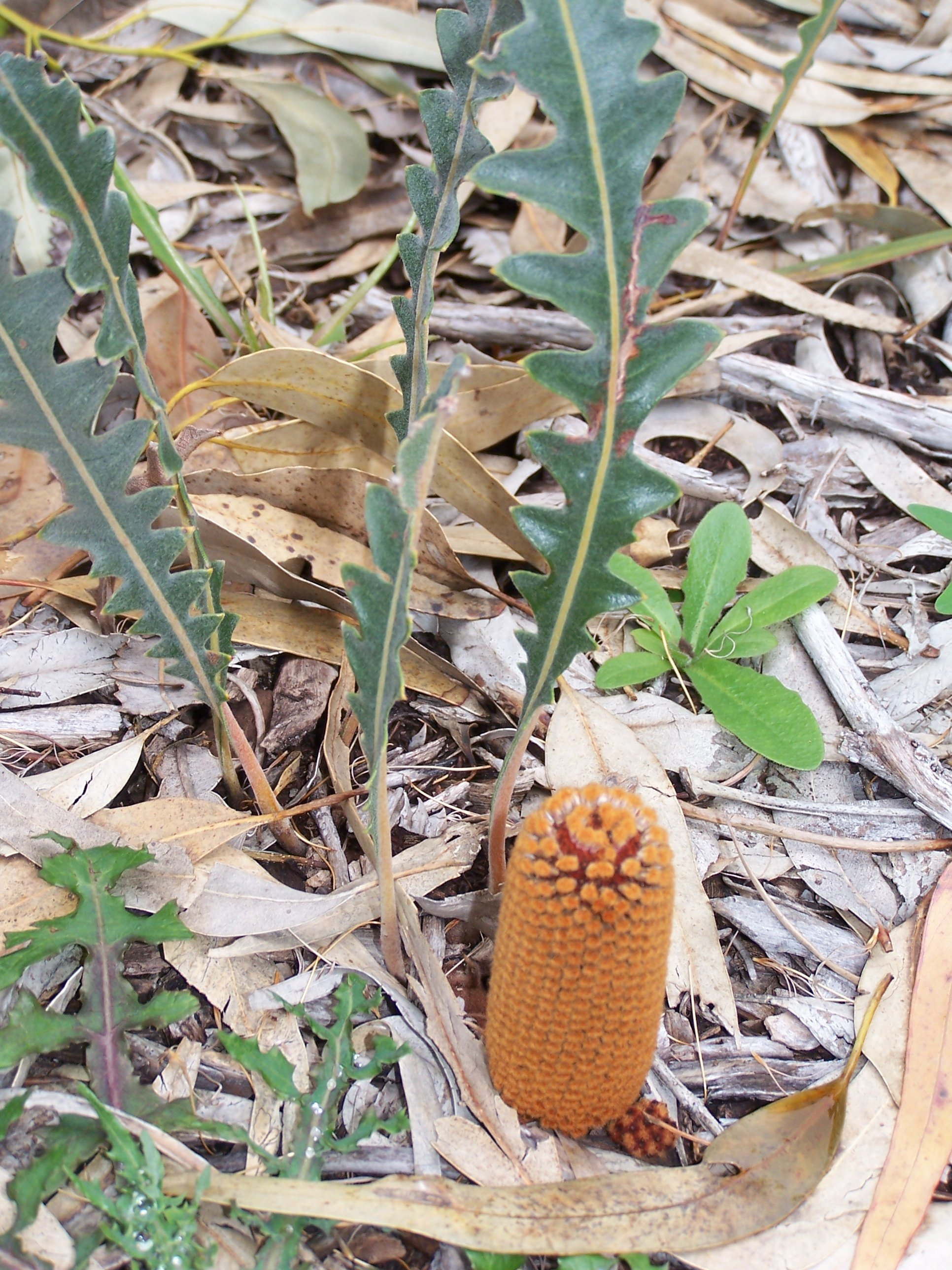
Unopened flowers
