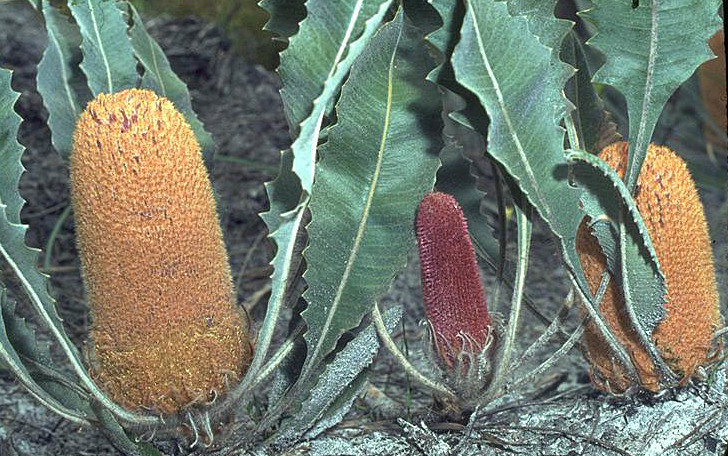
- Banksia goodii in Albany, Western Australia

Conservation status
- Endangered (IUCN 3.1)

Scientific classification
- Kingdom: Plantae
- Clade: Tracheophytes
- Clade: Angiosperms
- Clade: Eudicots
- Order: Proteales
- Family: Proteaceae
- Genus: Banksia
- Subgenus: Banksia subg. Banksia
- Section: Banksia sect. Banksia
- Series: Banksia ser. Prostratae
- Species: B. goodii

Binomial name
- Banksia goodii R.Br.

Synonyms
- Banksia barbigera Meisn.; Sirmuellera goodii (R.Br.) Kuntze

= Banksia goodii =

Good's banksia

Species of plant of Western Australia

Banksia goodii, commonly known as Good's banksia, is a species of prostrate shrub that is endemic to a small area in the south-west of Western Australia. It has densely hairy stems, wavy, oblong to egg-shaped leaves with irregularly serrated margins, rusty-brown flowers and hairy fruit. It grows in low forest and woodland near Albany, Western Australia, and is listed as "endangered".

== Description ==
Good's banksia grows as a low shrub, either prostrate or with stems up to 20 cm (7.9 in) high, and forms a lignotuber. The stems and leaves are densely hairy and new growth is a striking purple colour. The leaves are dark green with a prominent yellow midrib and are held erect. They are wavy, oblong to egg-shaped with the narrower end towards the base, coarsely and irregularly serrated along their edges. The flower spikes are 80–150 mm (3.1–5.9 in) long with prominent, hairy involucral bracts at the base of the head. The flowers are rusty brown with cream-coloured styles. The perianth is 24–26 mm (0.94–1.02 in) long and the pistil 29–31 mm (1.1–1.2 in) long and gently curved. Flowering occurs in May and November and the follicles are elliptical, 25–32 mm (0.98–1.26 in) long, 10–15 mm (0.39–0.59 in) high and 10–12 mm (0.39–0.47 in) wide and densely hairy. The old spikes have a hairy appearance due to retention of old withered flower parts. Some spikes produce no follicles but sometimes up to fifteen are formed.

== Taxonomy and naming ==
Banksia goodii was first formally described in 1830 by Robert Brown in the Supplementum primum Prodromi florae Novae Hollandiae from specimens collected by William Baxter near King George's Sound in 1829. The specific epithet (goodii) honours Peter Good, gardener assistant to Robert Brown.

In 1891, Otto Kuntze, in his Revisio Generum Plantarum, rejected the generic name Banksia L.f., on the grounds that the name Banksia had previously been published in 1776 as Banksia J.R.Forst & G.Forst, referring to the genus now known as Pimelea. Kuntze proposed Sirmuellera as an alternative, referring to this species as Sirmuellera goodii. This application of the principle of priority was largely ignored by Kuntze's contemporaries, and Banksia L.f. was formally conserved and Sirmuellera rejected in 1940.

== Distribution and habitat ==
Good's banksia occurs on shallow white or grey sand over laterite, in low forest and woodland in southwest Western Australia between Albany and the Porongorup Range. The distribution was probably greater before much of the surrounding land was cleared for agriculture.

== Conservation status ==
There are seventeen known populations of this banksia, ranging in size from 10 to 300 plants for a total of around 1000. It is listed as "vulnerable" under the Environment Protection and Biodiversity Conservation Act 1999 and as "Threatened Flora (Declared Rare Flora — Extant)" by the Department of Environment and Conservation (Western Australia). The main threats to the species include inappropriate fire regimes, road maintenance and land clearing.

The IUCN listed the species as "Endangered". Their justification was that "there is suspected to have been at least a 50% loss of the population through land conversion over the past three generations (300 years in total); it seems plausible that there will be a minor loss (perhaps 10%) of remaining populations in the next 100 years; in view of this, there will have been a loss of over 50% of the population over a three generation period. The species is probably not severely fragmented, and occurs at fewer than ten but more than five threat-defined locations. There may be as few as 1,500 individuals remaining".

== Use in horticulture ==
Seeds do not require any treatment, and take 19 to 56 days to germinate.
