= Banksia gardneri var. hiemalis =

Scientific classification
- Kingdom: Plantae
- Clade: Tracheophytes
- Clade: Angiosperms
- Clade: Eudicots
- Order: Proteales
- Family: Proteaceae
- Genus: Banksia
- Species: B. gardneri
- Variety: B. g. var. hiemalis

Trinomial name
- Banksia gardneri var. hiemalis A.S.George

Variety of prostrate shrub

Banksia gardneri var. hiemalis is a variety of Banksia gardneri. It is native to the Southwest Botanical Province of Western Australia. Seeds do not require any treatment, and take around 19 days to germinate.
