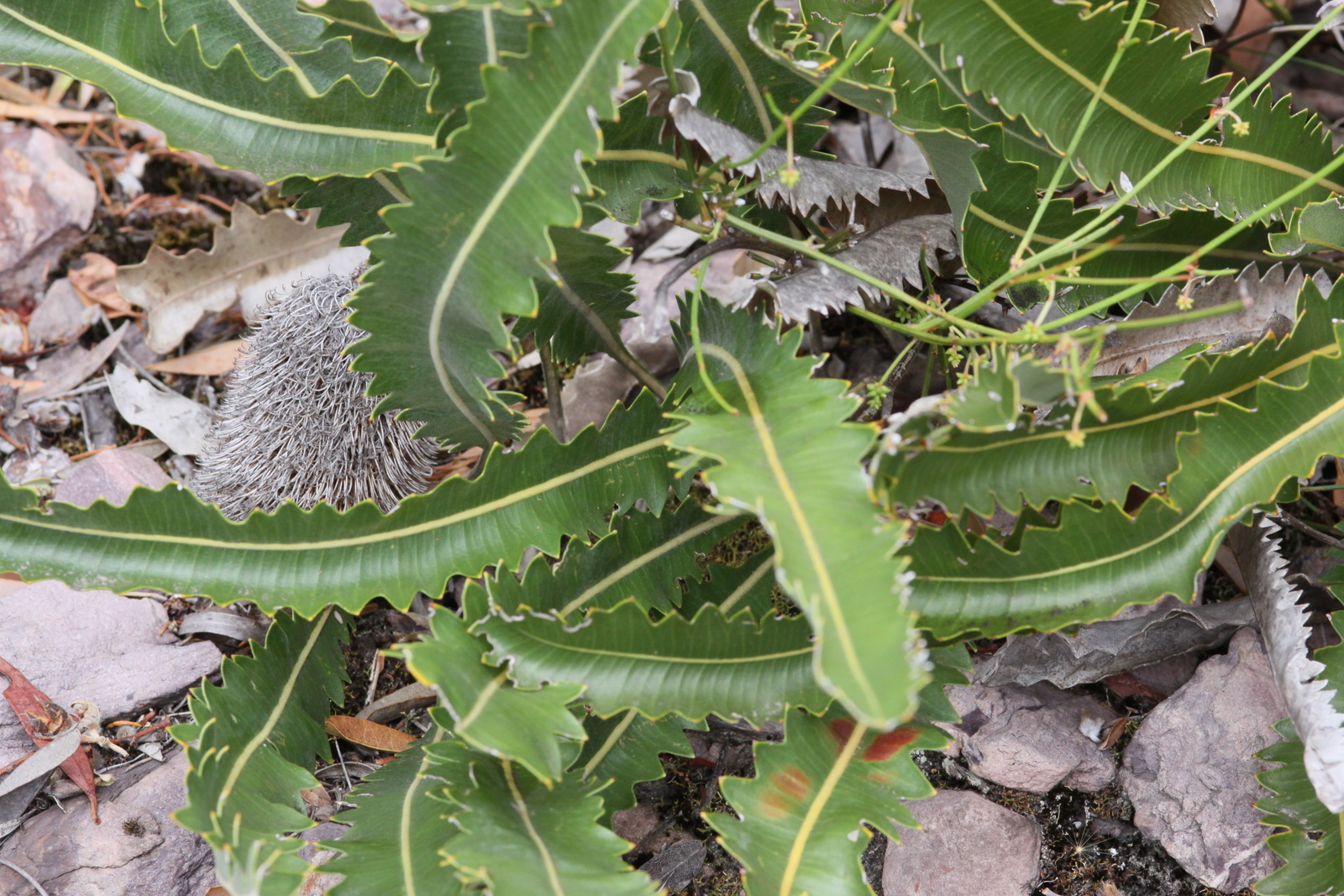

Scientific classification
- Kingdom: Plantae
- Clade: Tracheophytes
- Clade: Angiosperms
- Clade: Eudicots
- Order: Proteales
- Family: Proteaceae
- Genus: Banksia
- Species: B. gardneri
- Variety: B. g. var. brevidentata

Trinomial name
- Banksia gardneri var. brevidentata A.S.George

Synonyms
- Banksia brevidentata (A.S.George) K.R.Thiele

= Banksia gardneri var. brevidentata =

Variety of shrub in the flowering plants

Banksia gardneri var. brevidentata is a variety of prostrate shrub that is endemic to the south-west of Western Australia.
