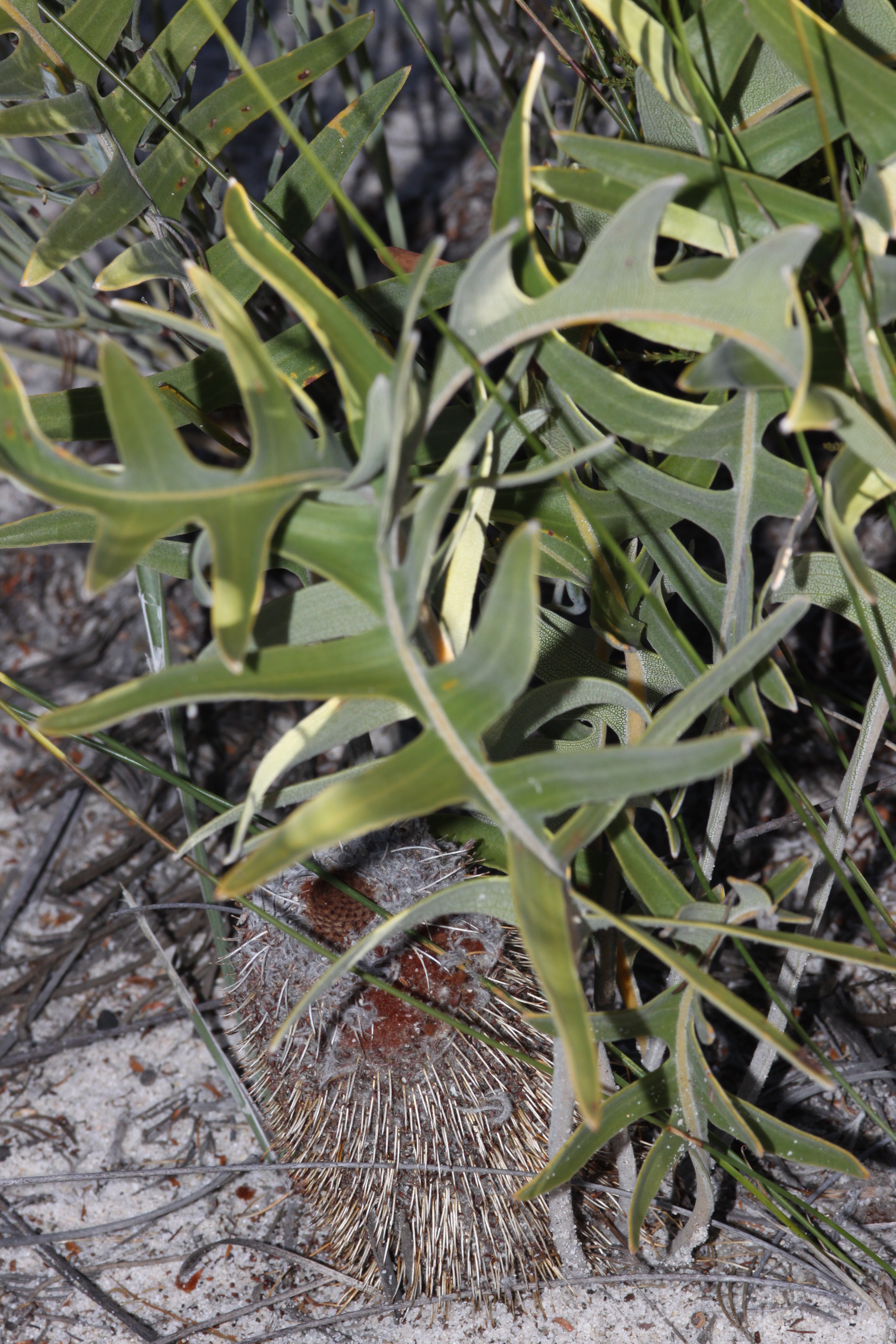
- Banksia chamaephyton with rather old flower spike at Alexander Morrison National Park, Western Australia

Conservation status
- Priority Four — Rare Taxa (DEC)

Scientific classification
- Kingdom: Plantae
- Clade: Tracheophytes
- Clade: Angiosperms
- Clade: Eudicots
- Order: Proteales
- Family: Proteaceae
- Genus: Banksia
- Species: B. chamaephyton

Binomial name
- Banksia chamaephyton A.S.George

= Banksia chamaephyton =

Fishbone banksia

Species of shrub native to Western Australia

Banksia chamaephyton, commonly known as the fishbone banksia, is a species of shrub that is endemic to Western Australia. It has prostrate, underground stems, pinnatipartite leaves, cream-coloured and brown flowers arranged in spikes surrounded by hairy bracts. It grows in kwongan near the lower west coast.

== Description ==
Banksia chamaephyton is a shrub that typically grows to 0.4 m (1 ft 4 in) high and 2 m (6 ft 7 in) wide and forms a lignotuber. It has prostrate, underground stems 8–12 mm (0.31–0.47 in) in diameter and hairy when young. The leaves are erect, 200–500 mm (7.9–19.7 in) long, 40–160 mm (1.6–6.3 in) wide on a petiole 40–210 mm (1.6–8.3 in) long and has between ten and thirty linear lobes on each side. The flowers are cream-coloured with a brown tip and arranged in a head 60–120 mm (2.4–4.7 in) long surrounded at the base by velvety involucral bracts. The perianth is 23–30 mm (0.91–1.18 in) long and the pistil curved and 25–35 mm (0.98–1.38 in) long. Flowering occurs from late October to early December and there are up to fifteen elliptic follicles in each head, the follicles 25–40 mm (0.98–1.57 in) long, 12–20 mm (0.47–0.79 in) high and 15–20 mm (0.59–0.79 in) wide.

== Taxonomy and naming ==
Banksia chamaephyton was first formally described in 1981 by Alex George from specimens he collected west of Mogumber in 1971. The specific epithet (chamaephyton) is derived from ancient Greek words meaning "low-growing" and "plant", referring to the prostrate habit of this species.

== Distribution and habitat ==
Fishbone banksia grows in kwongan between Eneabba and Mogumber.

== Conservation status ==
This banksia is classified as "Priority Four" by the Government of Western Australia Department of Parks and Wildlife, meaning that is rare or near threatened.

== Use in horticulture ==
Seeds do not require any treatment, and take around 25 days to germinate.
