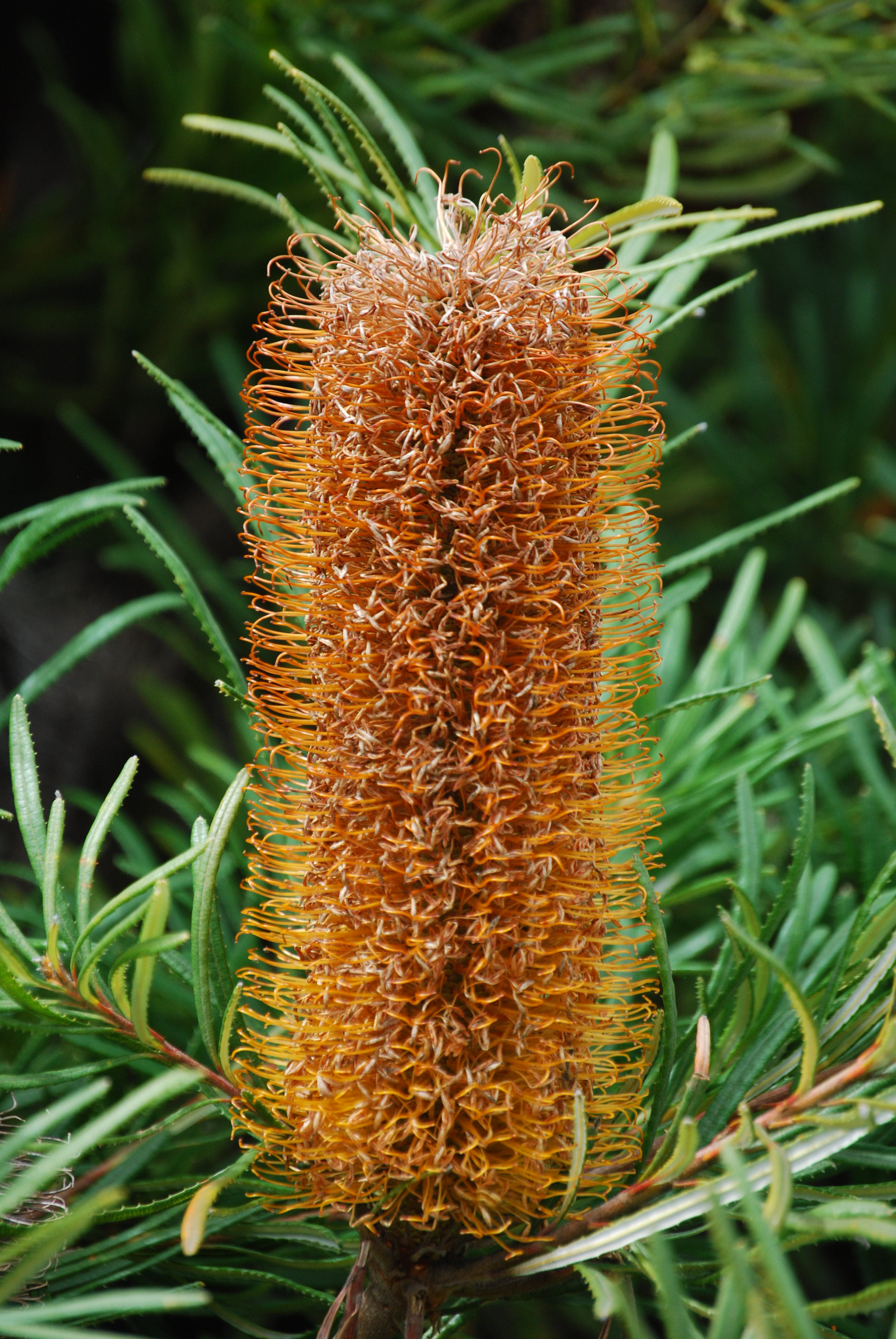

Scientific classification
- Kingdom: Plantae
- Clade: Tracheophytes
- Clade: Angiosperms
- Clade: Eudicots
- Order: Proteales
- Family: Proteaceae
- Genus: Banksia
- Species: B. spinulosa Sm.
- Variety: B. s. var. spinulosa

Trinomial name
- Banksia spinulosa var. spinulosa

= Banksia spinulosa var. spinulosa =

Variety of shrub from eastern Australia

Banksia spinulosa var. spinulosa is a shrub that grows along the east coast of Australia, in Queensland and New South Wales.

== Description ==
As with the other varieties of B. spinulosa (hairpin banksia), B. spinulosa var. spinulosa grows as a multi-stemmed lignotuberous shrub with flower spikes that are all golden or golden with red or purple styles. Its strongly revolute leaf margins distinguish it from the other varieties, and it is further distinguished from B. spinulosa var. collina in having narrower leaves that are serrate only towards the leaf tips. It is also easily distinguished from B. spinulosa var. cunninghamii by its lignotuber and resultant multi-stemmed habit.

== Taxonomy ==
B. spinulosa var. spinulosa is an autonym that encompasses the type material of the species. This material was collected by John White, probably in 1792. The following year, the species was formally described by Smith in his A Specimen of the Botany of New Holland, and given the specific epithet "spinulosa", a Latin term meaning having minute spines, probably in reference to the leaf tips.

Before 1810, no taxon had been circumscribed as equivalent to today's B. spinulosa var. spinulosa. That year saw the publication of Banksia collina (now B. spinulosa var. collina), and from then until 1981, the circumscription of B. spinulosa was roughly equivalent to the present-day circumscription of B. spinulosa var. spinulosa.

In the first infrageneric arrangement of Banksia, that of Brown in 1830, B. spinulosa was placed in subgenus Banksia verae, the "True Banksias", because its inflorescence is a typical Banksia flower spike. It was placed next to B. cunninghamii and B. collina, both now considered varieties of B. spinulosa; these three were placed between B. ericifolia (heath-leaved banksia) and B. occidentalis (red swamp banksia). Banksia verae was renamed Eubanksia by Stephan Endlicher in 1847.

Carl Meissner demoted Eubanksia to sectional rank in his 1856 classification, and divided it into four series, with B. spinulosa placed in series Abietinae, while B. cunninghamii and B. collina were placed alongside each other in series Salicinae. When George Bentham published his 1870 arrangement in Flora Australiensis, he discarded Meissner's series, placing all the species with hooked styles together in a section that he named Oncostylis. This arrangement would stand for over a century.

Alex George published a new taxonomic arrangement of Banksia in his landmark 1981 monograph The genus Banksia L.f. (Proteaceae). Endlicher's Eubanksia became B. subg. Banksia, and was divided into three sections, one of which was Oncostylis. Oncostylis was further divided into four series, with B. spinulosa placed in series Spicigerae because its inflorescences are cylindrical. B. collina and B. cunninghamii were demoted to varieties of B. spinulosa, and as a result the name B. spinulosa var. spinulosa was used for the first time.

In 1996, Kevin Thiele and Pauline Ladiges published a new arrangement for the genus, after cladistic analyses yielded a cladogram significantly different from George's arrangement. Thiele and Ladiges' arrangement retained B. spinulosa var. spinulosa's position within the B. spinulosa complex, and retained B. spinulosa in series Spicigerae, but placed the species alone in B. subser. Spinulosae. This arrangement stood until 1999, when George effectively reverted to his 1981 arrangement in his monograph for the Flora of Australia series.

Under George's taxonomic arrangement of Banksia, B. spinulosa var. spinulosa's taxonomic placement may be summarised as follows:

Genus Banksia

Subgenus Banksia

Section Banksia
Section Coccinea
Section Oncostylis

Series Spicigerae

B. spinulosa

B. spinulosa var. spinulosa
B. spinulosa var. collina
B. spinulosa var. neoanglica
B. spinulosa var. cunninghamii

B. ericifolia
B. verticillata
B. seminuda
B. littoralis
B. occidentalis
B. brownii

Series Tricuspidae
Series Dryandroidae
Series Abietinae

Subgenus Isostylis

Since 1998, Austin Mast has been publishing results of ongoing cladistic analyses of DNA sequence data for the subtribe Banksiinae. His analyses suggest a phylogeny that is very greatly different from George's arrangement. George's and Thiele and Ladiges' positioning of B. spinulosa var. spinulosa within B. spinulosa is supported, but B. spinulosa's placement is not. Series Spicigerae appears to be polyphyletic, with B. spinulosa and B. ericifolia more closely related to the taxa in Series Salicinae than it is to the other members of series Spicigerae. Early in 2007, Mast and Thiele initiated a rearrangement of Banksia by merging Dryandra into it, and publishing B. subg. Spathulatae for the species having spoon-shaped cotyledons. They foreshadowed publishing a full arrangement once DNA sampling of Dryandra was complete; in the meantime, if Mast and Thiele's nomenclatural changes are taken as an interim arrangement, then B. spinulosa var. spinulosa is placed in B. subg. Spathulatae.

The variety has two taxonomic synonyms: Banksia incognita, published anonymously in The Naturalists' Pocket Magazine in 1798, and Banksia denticulata, published by Georges Louis Marie Dumont de Courset in 1814.

== Distribution and habitat ==
This variety occurs in a series of disjunct populations along the east coast of Australia. It is most common in New South Wales where it occurs from the border with Victoria north to Newcastle. In addition there are isolated populations near Gympie in southeast Queensland, between Coral Bay and Gladstone in central Queensland, inland on the Blackdown Tableland, and in north Queensland between Mossman and Ravenshoe. It mainly grows in sand, occurring on both coastal plain and inland mountains. It is typically an understory shrub in open forests and woodlands of Eucalyptus.

== Cultivation ==
This variety is a popular garden plant, and is grown under a wide range of conditions in eastern Australia. Its behaviour is difficult to predict, as it varies greatly with provenance and growing conditions. In general, it grows slowly, taking up to eight years to flower from seed. It tolerates heavy pruning, and may even be pruned back the ground, as it can be relied upon to resprout from its lignotuber. It is also frost tolerant to −8 °C (18 °F). It prefers a sunny or somewhat shady aspect, in well-drained or heavy soil.

== Gallery ==
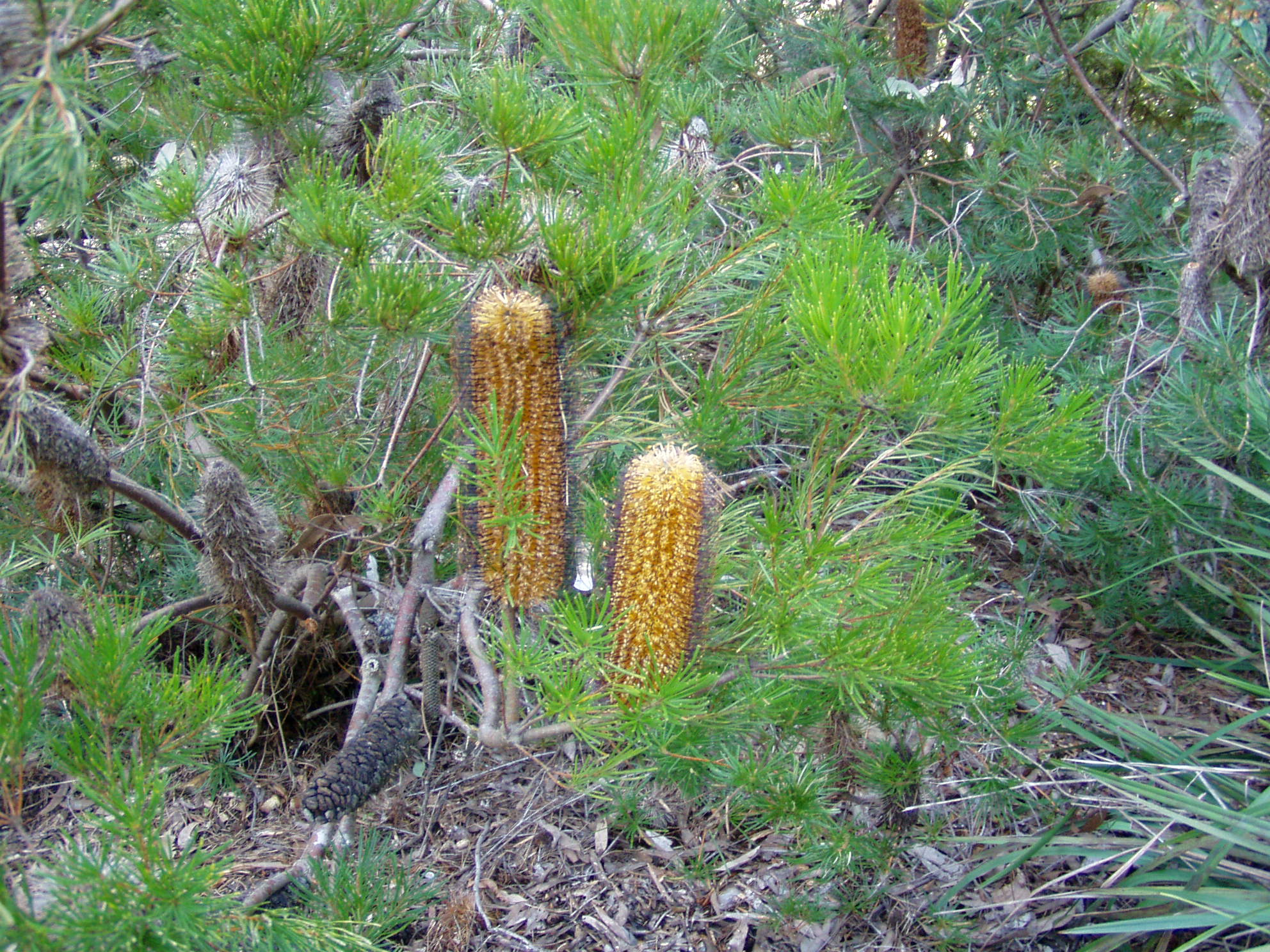
B. spinulosa spinulosa ANBG, Canberra

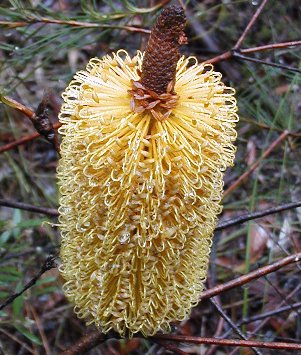
Banksia spinulosa (yellow styles), Georges River National Park (near Sydney)

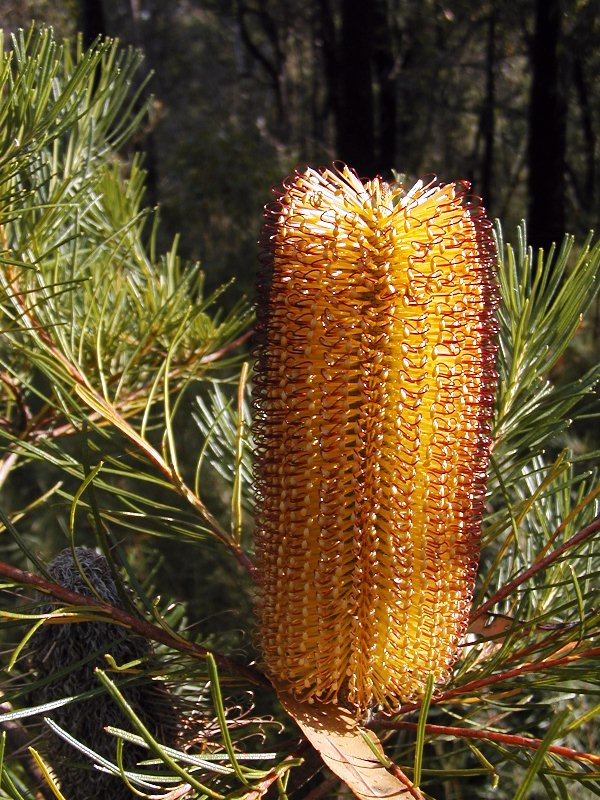
Nowra, NSW. May 2005

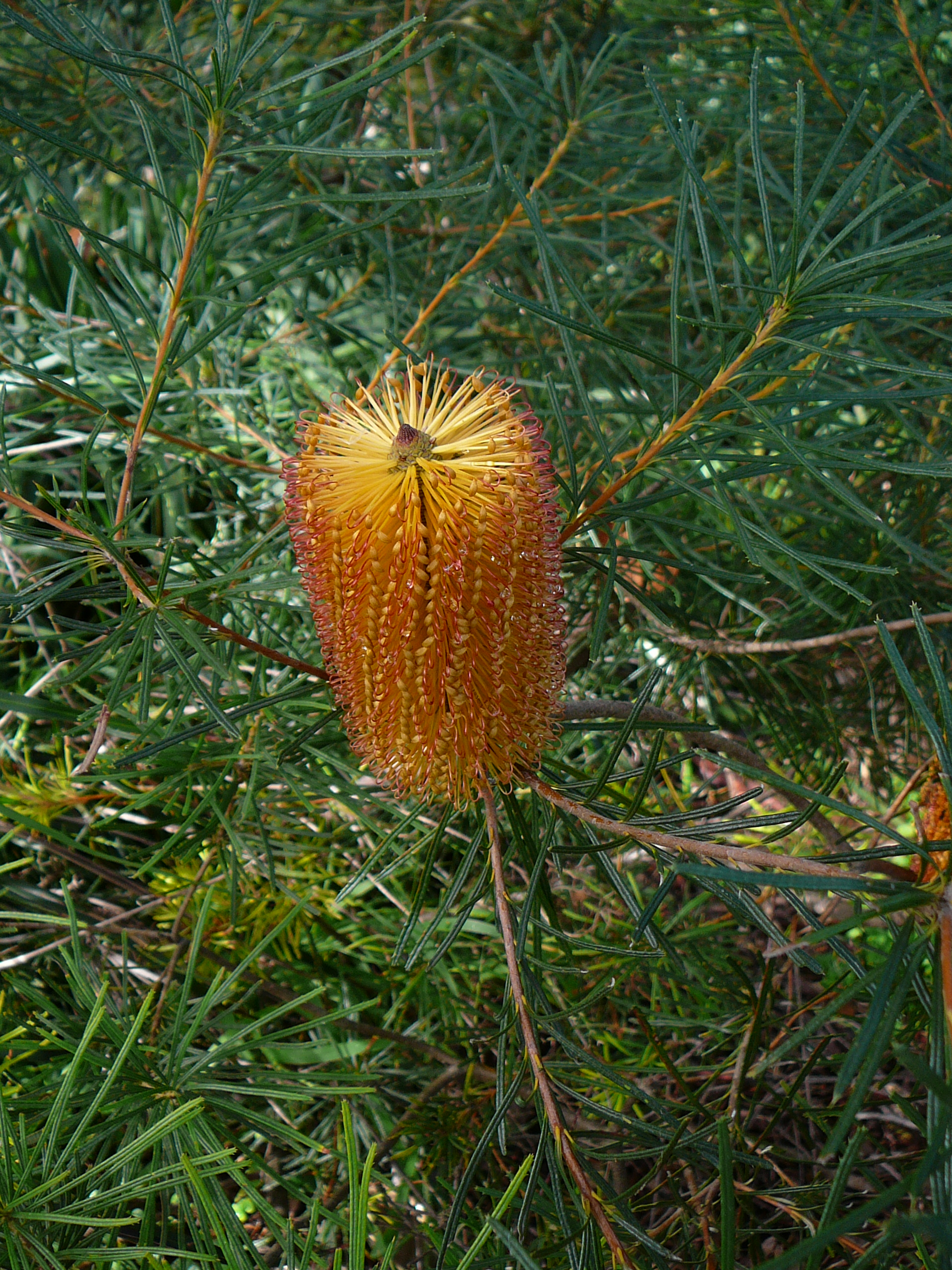
Wollstonecraft. April 2007
