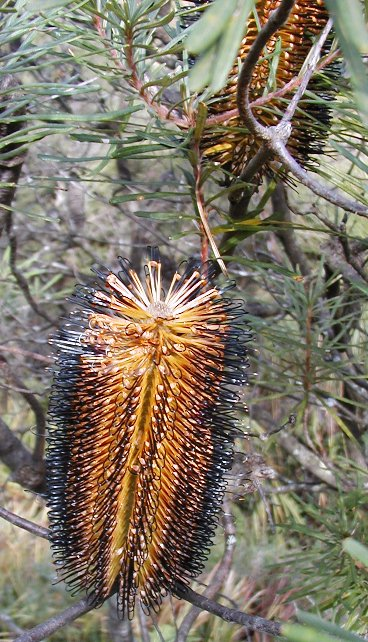

Scientific classification
- Kingdom: Plantae
- Clade: Tracheophytes
- Clade: Angiosperms
- Clade: Eudicots
- Order: Proteales
- Family: Proteaceae
- Genus: Banksia
- Species: B. spinulosa
- Variety: B. s. var. cunninghamii

Trinomial name
- Banksia spinulosa var. cunninghamii (Sieber ex Rchb.) A.S.George

= Banksia spinulosa var. cunninghamii =

Variety of shrub from eastern Australia

Banksia spinulosa var. cunninghamii, sometimes given species rank as Banksia cunninghamii, is a shrub that grows along the east coast of Australia, in Victoria and New South Wales. It is a fast-growing non-lignotuberous shrub or small tree infrequently cultivated.

== Description ==
As with the other varieties of B. spinulosa (hairpin banksia), B. spinulosa var. collina grows as a multi-stemmed shrub with flower spikes that are all golden or golden with red or purple styles. Its leaves, flowers and fruit are all very similar to though of B. neoanglica (Hill Banksia), but unlike this and all other varieties of B. spinulosa, B. spinulosa var. cunninghamii lacks a lignotuber.

== Taxonomy ==
B. spinulosa var. cunninghamii was first collected by Franz Sieber in 1823, from Mount York in the Blue Mountains of New South Wales. He gave it the name Banksia cunninghamii in honour of Allan Cunningham, and this name was honoured when a formal description of the taxon was published by Ludwig Reichenbach in 1827.

It retained its specific rank in Brown's 1830 arrangement of Banksia, being placed between B. spinulosa and B. collina (now B. spinulosa var. collina) in subgenus Banksia verae, the "True Banksias", because its inflorescence is a typical Banksia flower spike. It was placed immediately.

Over the next 26 years, three synonyms were published. The first, Banksia lambertii, was published by Richard Courtois in 1833. Then in 1853 Ferdinand von Mueller published Banksia prionophylla. This was a nomen nudum until the following year, when Carl Meissner republished the name with a formal description. This is now considered a taxonomic synonym of B. spinulosa var. cunninghamii, although in 1981 Alf Salkin proposed to resurrect the name for the Victorian population, on grounds of the large distance (700 km) between forms, and some distinguishing characteristics. A final synonym, Banksia ledifolia, dates from 1856, when Meissner inexplicably listed the name as a synonym (authored by Cunningham and in manuscript form in the Herbarium) in his chapter on the Proteaceae for A. P. de Candolle's Prodromus.

Banksia verae was renamed Eubanksia by Stephan Endlicher in 1847, and in Meissner's 1856 classification it was demoted to sectional rank. Meissner further divided it into four series, with B. cunninghamii placed alongside B. collina in series Salicinae, while B. spinulosa was placed in series Abietinae.

When George Bentham published his 1870 arrangement in Flora Australiensis, he discarded Meissner's series, placing all the species with hooked styles together in a section that he named Oncostylis. B. cunninghamii was reduced to synonymy with B. collina, which was placed next to B. spinulosa in section Oncostylis. This arrangement would stand for over a century.

Alex George published a new taxonomic arrangement of Banksia in his landmark 1981 monograph The genus Banksia L.f. (Proteaceae). Endlicher's Eubanksia became B. subg. Banksia, and was divided into three sections, one of which was Oncostylis. Oncostylis was further divided into four series, with B. spinulosa placed in series Spicigerae because its inflorescences are cylindrical. B. cunninghamii was reinstated at variety rank as B. spinulosa var. cunninghamii.

In 1996, Kevin Thiele and Pauline Ladiges published a new arrangement for the genus, after cladistic analyses yielded a cladogram significantly different from George's arrangement. Thiele and Ladiges' arrangement retained B. spinulosa var. collina's position within the B. spinulosa complex, and retained B. spinulosa in series Spicigerae, but placed the species alone in B. subser. Spinulosae. This arrangement stood until 1999, when George effectively reverted to his 1981 arrangement in his monograph for the Flora of Australia series.

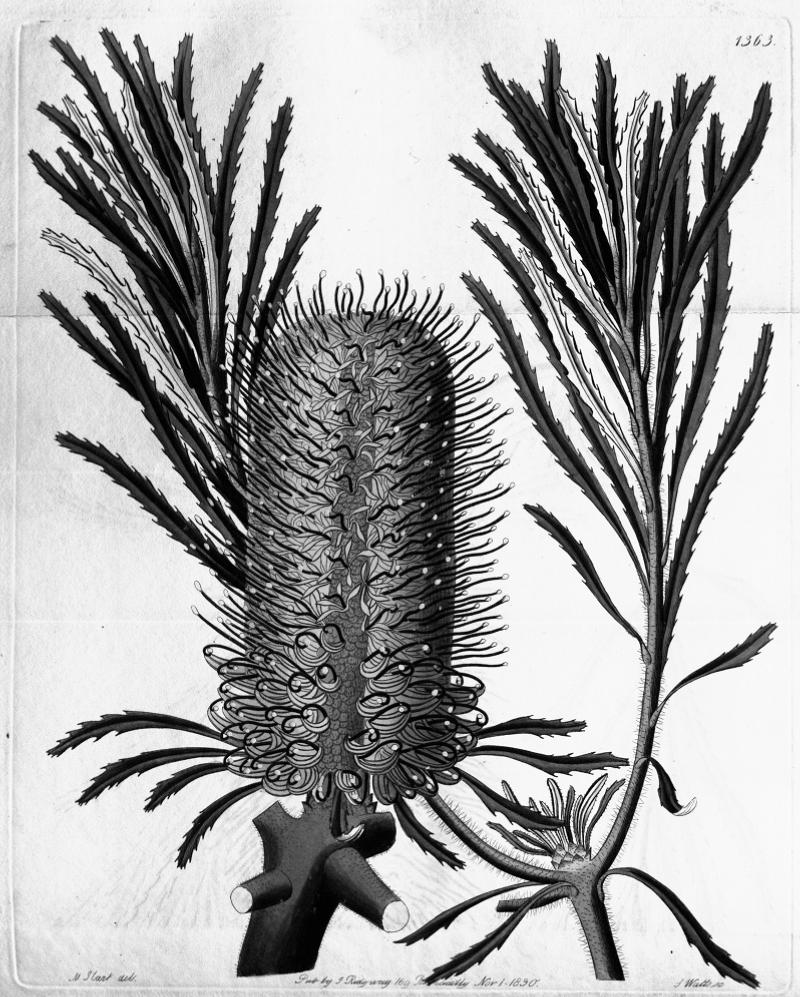
In 1830, a colour plate of B. spinulosa var. cunninghamii was featured in Edwards's Botanical Register, but misidentified as B. littoralis (western swamp banksia).

Under George's taxonomic arrangement of Banksia, B. spinulosa var. cunninghamii's taxonomic placement may be summarised as follows:

Genus Banksia

Subgenus Banksia

Section Banksia
Section Coccinea
Section Oncostylis

Series Spicigerae

B. spinulosa

B. spinulosa var. spinulosa
B. spinulosa var. collina
B. spinulosa var. neoanglica
B. spinulosa var. cunninghamii

B. ericifolia
B. verticillata
B. seminuda
B. littoralis
B. occidentalis
B. brownii

Series Tricuspidae
Series Dryandroidae
Series Abietinae

Subgenus Isostylis

Since 1998, Austin Mast has been publishing results of ongoing cladistic analyses of DNA sequence data for the subtribe Banksiinae. His analyses suggest a phylogeny that is very greatly different to George's arrangement. George's and Thiele and Ladiges' positioning of B. spinulosa var. cunninghamii within B. spinulosa is supported, but B. spinulosa's placement is not. Series Spicigerae appears to be polyphyletic, with B. spinulosa and B. ericifolia more closely related to the taxa in Series Salicinae than it is to the other members of series Spicigerae. Early in 2007, Mast and Thiele initiated a rearrangement of Banksia by merging Dryandra into it, and publishing B. subg. Spathulatae for the species having spoon-shaped cotyledons. They foreshadowed publishing a full arrangement once DNA sampling of Dryandra was complete; in the meantime, if Mast and Thiele's nomenclatural changes are taken as an interim arrangement, then B. spinulosa var. cunninghamii is placed in B. subg. Spathulatae.

To date, the National Herbarium of New South Wales continues to treat this taxon as having species rank, referring to it as B. cunninghamii. Moreover, B. neoanglica is treated as a subspecies of it; this placement has no formal name, so is referred to by the manuscript name Banksia cunninghamii subsp. A sensu Harden. A 2013 molecular study by Marcel Cardillo and colleagues using chloroplast DNA and combining it with earlier results placed B. cunninghamii as the earliest offshoot of a lineage that gave rise to the three other subspecies of B. spinulosa.

== Distribution and habitat ==
This taxon occurs along the coast from Melbourne, Victoria to the northern boundary of New South Wales, with large populations east of Melbourne, along the coast near the boundary of Victoria and New South Wales, and around Sydney. There are also many records of collections of this species in mountainous areas of northern New South Wales, but these probably need to be re-classified as B. neoanglica.

It mainly grows in sand, often over rock, but is also found in heavier soils. It is usually an understory shrub in open forests and woodlands of Eucalyptus.

== Cultivation ==
B. spinulosa var. cunninghamii is a fast-growing shrub that flowers in around five years from seed. The flower spikes are attractive but are often obscured by foliage. It prefers a well-drained heavy soil with some shade, and tolerates frost down to −8 °C (18 °F). It should be pruned only lightly, and not below the green foliage.
