= Brown's taxonomic arrangement of Banksia =

1810 taxonomy of certain flowering plants

Robert Brown's taxonomic arrangement of Banksia was published in his book of 1810, Prodromus Florae Novae Hollandiae et Insulae Van Diemen, and expanded in the supplement to that publication, Supplementum Primum Prodromi Florae Novae Hollandiae, in 1830. It was the first survey of Banksia species to be published, and included descriptions of a number of previously undescribed species.

== Background ==
Banksia is a genus of around 175 species in the plant family Proteaceae. An iconic Australian wildflower and popular garden plant, they are recognised by their flower spikes or domes, and their fruiting "cones". They grow in forms varying from prostrate woody shrubs to trees up to 35 metres tall, and occur in all but the most arid areas of Australia. As heavy producers of nectar, they are important sources of food for nectariferous animals such as honeyeaters and honey possum, and they are of economic importance to the nursery and cut flower industries. However they are seriously threatened by a number of processes including land clearing, frequent burning, and disease, and a number of species are rare and endangered.

== Brown's 1810 arrangement ==
Specimens of Banksia were first collected by Sir Joseph Banks and Dr Daniel Solander, naturalists on HM Bark Endeavour during Lieutenant (later Captain) James Cook's voyage to the Pacific Ocean in 1770. By the time of Brown's arrangement of 1810, less than 20 Banksia species had been published. However, Brown had himself collected specimens of 26 unpublished species in 1801 and 1802. Thirteen of these were thought by Brown to belong to a new genus, which he named Dryandra (now B. ser. Dryandra). The remaining species were assigned to Banksia; thus Brown was able to publish an arrangement of 31 species.

Brown divided Banksia into two unranked groups. He placed B. ilicifolia alone in Isostylis because of its unusual dome-shaped inflorescences. All other species were placed in Banksia verae, the "true banksias", because they have the elongate flower spike then considered characteristic of Banksia. The arrangement was as follows:

Banksia

Banksia verae

B. pulchella
B. sphærocarpa
B. nutans
B. ericifolia
B. spinulosa
B. collina (now B. spinulosa var. collina)
B. occidentalis
B. littoralis
B. marginata
B. depressa (now B. marginata)
B. patula (now B. marginata)
B. australis (now B. marginata)
B. insularis (now B. marginata)
B. integrifolia
B. compar (now B. integrifolia subsp. compar)
B. verticillata
B. coccinea
B. paludosa
B. oblongifolia
B. latifolia (now B. robur)
B. marcescens (now B. praemorsa)
B. attenuata
B. elatior (now B. aemula)
B. serrata
B. æmula
B. dentata
B. quercifolia
B. speciosa
B. grandis
B. repens

Isostylis

B. ilicifolia

== Brown's 1830 arrangement ==
Brown released a second edition of his Prodromus in 1821, but no new species of Banksia had been collected since that time, so the arrangement was the same as in the first edition. Between 1823 and 1829, a number of new species were collected, most of which were not published. In 1830, Brown issued his Supplementum, describing eleven additional Banksia species, nine of which were previously unpublished. A revised arrangement was not proffered; instead, Brown gave a position into which each new taxon was to be inserted in the 1810 arrangement. Brown's 1830 arrangement may be summarised as follows:

Banksia

Banksia verae

B. pulchella
B. sphærocarpa
B. nutans
B. ericifolia
B. spinulosa
B. Cunninghamii (now B. spinulosa var. cunninghamii)
B. collina (now B. spinulosa var. collina)
B. occidentalis
B. littoralis
B. marginata
B. depressa (now B. marginata)
B. patula (now B. marginata)
B. australis (now B. marginata)
B. insularis (now B. marginata)
B. integrifolia
B. compar (now B. integrifolia subsp. compar)
B. verticillata
B. coccinea
B. paludosa
B. oblongifolia
B. latifolia (now B. robur)
B. marcescens (now B. praemorsa)
B. media
B. attenuata
B. Caleyi
B. Baueri
B. Menziesii
B. elatior (now B. aemula)
B. serrata
B. æmula
B. dentata
B. quercifolia
B. speciosa
B. Solandri
B. grandis
B. Baxteri
B. Goodii
B. prostrata (now B. gardneri)
B. repens
B. Dryandroides
B. Brownii

B. subg. Isostylis

B. ilicifolia

== Legacy ==
Brown's Banksia verae was renamed Eubanksia by Stephan Endlicher in 1847. The arrangement was eventually superseded by Carl Meissner's 1856 revision. Meissner retained Eubanksia and Isostylis, giving them sectional rank. They have since been promoted to subgenus rank by Alex George, although Eubanksia is now known as B. subg. Banksia.

Recent cladistic analyses have revealed a phylogeny that Brown's arrangement fails to reflect. Dryandra is shown to have arisen from within the ranks of Banksia, so should not have been treated as a separate genus; and B. ilicifolia is a fairly derived species, contrary to the basal position suggested by Brown. The phyletic order of species is accurate in some cases but grossly inaccurate in others; for example B. brownii and B. nutans are closely related but are placed very far apart by Brown.

== See also ==
- List of Australian plant species authored by Robert Brown
