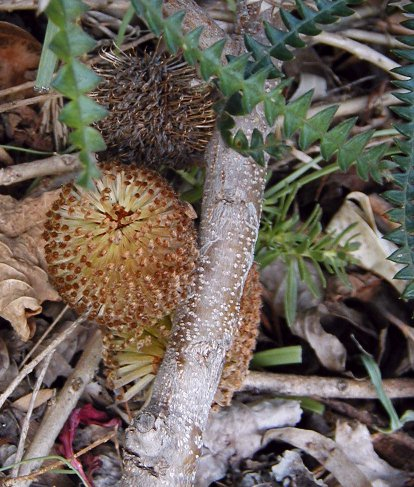
- B. dryandroides (dryandra-leaved banksia), the type species of B. ser. Dryandroideae

Scientific classification
- Kingdom: Plantae
- Clade: Tracheophytes
- Clade: Angiosperms
- Clade: Eudicots
- Order: Proteales
- Family: Proteaceae
- Genus: Banksia
- Subgenus: Banksia subg. Banksia
- Section: Banksia sect. Oncostylis
- Series: Banksia ser. Dryandroideae; Meisn.

= Banksia ser. Dryandroideae =

Taxonomic series of Australian plants

Banksia ser. Dryandroideae is a taxonomic series in the plant genus Banksia. First published by Carl Meissner in 1856, the name has had two circumscriptions. As presently circumscribed it is monotypic, containing only B. dryandroides.

== According to Meissner ==
B. ser. Dryandroideae was first published in 1856, in Carl Meissner's chapter on the Proteaceae in A. P. de Candolle's Prodromus systematis naturalis regni vegetabilis. It was one of four series into which the subgenus Eubanksia was divided. These four series were defined in terms of leaf characters, with series Dryandroideae containing the species with leaves divided into lobels. As they were defined on leaf characters alone, all of Meissner's series were highly heterogeneous.

The placement and circumscription of B. ser. Dryandroideae in Meissner's arrangement may be summarised as follows:

Banksia

B. sect. Eubanksia

B. ser. Abietinae (8 species, 1 variety)
B. ser. Salicinae (23 species, 8 varieties)
B. ser. Quercinae (18 species, 2 varieties)
B. ser. Dryandroideae

B. grandis
B. Baxteri
B. speciosa
B. Victoriæ
B. elegans
B. Candolleana
B. dryandroides
B. Brownii

B. sect. Isostylis (1 species)

Meissner's arrangement was current until 1870, when George Bentham published his arrangement, discarding all four of Meissner's series.

== According to George ==
In 1981, Alex George published a thorough revision of Banksia in his classic monograph The genus Banksia L.f. (Proteaceae). Though he did not accept Meissner's definition of B. ser. Dryandroideae, he felt that "Banksia dryandroides appears to provide a link between the Spicigerae and the Abietinae but is sufficiently distinct from both to be placed in its own series." He therefore resurrected B. ser. Dryandroideae as a monotypic series containing B. dryandroideae alone, placing it in Bentham's B. sect. Oncostylis, which was defined as containing the species with hooked styles. Since Meissner had not designated a type species for the series, George also declared B. dryandroides to lectotype.

The placement and circumscription of B. ser. Dryandroideae in George's taxonomic arrangement of Banksia may be summarised as follows:

Banksia

B. subg. Banksia

B. sect. Banksia (9 series, 50 species, 9 subspecies, 3 varieties)
B. sect. Coccinea (1 species)
B. sect. Oncostylis

B. ser. Spicigerae (7 species, 2 subspecies, 4 varieties)
B. ser. Tricuspidae (1 species)
B. ser. Dryandroideae

B. dryandroides

B. ser. Abietinae (13 species, 2 subspecies, 9 varieties)

B. subg. Isostylis (3 species)

In 1996, Kevin Thiele and Pauline Ladiges published a new arrangement of Banksia, after cladistic analyses yielded a cladogram significantly different from George's arrangement. George's sections were discarded, but many of his series were retained. Thiele and Ladiges found B. dryandroides to be sister (that is, the next closest relative) to a clade containing B. ser. Abietinae and B. tricuspis (Lesueur banksia). Since this placement was consistent with the placement of B. dryandroides alone in a series, and on the stated principle that "[n]omenclatural changes from the currently accepted classification are minimised", Thiele and Ladiges retained George's circumscription of B. ser. Dryandroideae as containing only B. dryandroides.

The placement and circumscription of B. ser. Dryandroideae in Thiele and Ladiges' arrangement may be summarised as follows:

Banksia

B. subg. Isostylis (3 species)
B. elegans (incertae sedis)
B. subg. Banksia

B. ser. Tetragonae (4 species)
B. ser. Lindleyanae (1 species)
B. ser. Banksia (2 subseries, 12 species)
B. baueri (incertae sedis)
B. lullfitzii (incertae sedis)
B. attenuata (incertae sedis)
B. ashbyi (incertae sedis)
B. coccinea (incertae sedis)
B. ser. Prostratae (8 species)
B. ser. Cyrtostylis (4 species)
B. ser. Ochraceae (3 species, 2 subspecies)
B. ser. Grandes (2 species)
B. ser. Salicinae (2 subseries, 11 species, 4 subspecies)
B. ser. Spicigerae (3 subseries, 7 species, 6 varieties)
B. ser. Quercinae (2 species)
B. ser. Dryandroideae

B. dryandroides

B. ser. Abietinae (4 subseries, 15 species, 8 varieties)

Thiele and Ladiges' arrangement remained current only until 1999, when George's treatment of the genus for the Flora of Australia series of monographs was published. This was essentially a revision of George's 1981 arrangement, which took into account some of Thiele and Ladiges' data, but rejected their overall arrangement. With respect to B. ser. Dryandroideae, George's 1999 arrangement is no different from that of 1981.

== Recent developments ==
Since 1998, Austin Mast has been publishing results of ongoing cladistic analyses of DNA sequence data for the subtribe Banksiinae. His analyses suggest a phylogeny that is very greatly different from George's taxonomic arrangement, though it is not yet clear how these findings will impace B. ser. Dryandroideae.

Early in 2007 Mast and Thiele initiated a rearrangement of Banksia by transferring Dryandra into it, and publishing B. subg. Spathulatae for the species having spoon-shaped cotyledons. B. dryandroides falls within B. subg. Spathulatae, but no further details have been proffered. Mast and Thiele have foreshadowed publishing a full arrangement once DNA sampling of Dryandra is complete.
