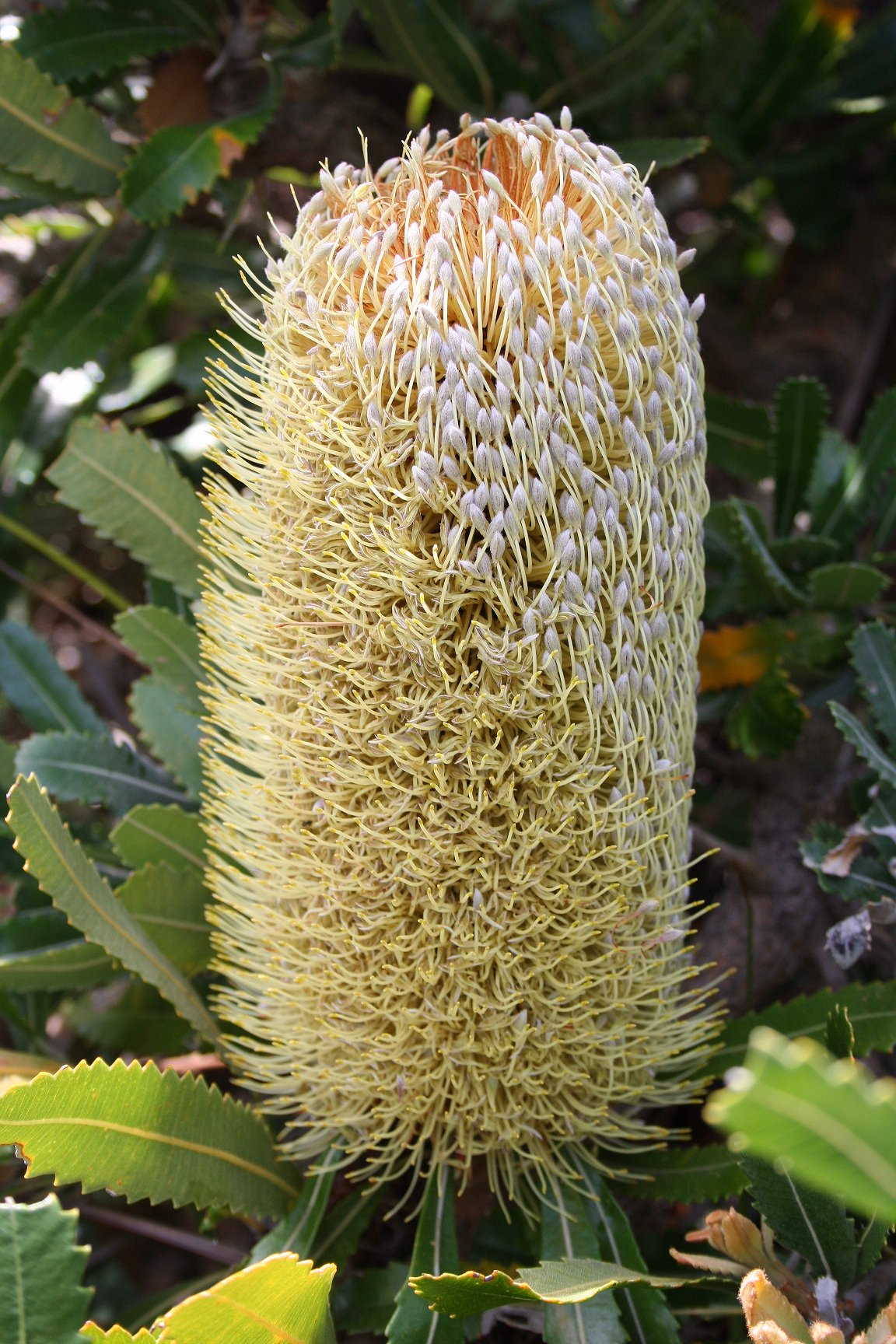
- Banksia serrata (saw banksia), the type species of Banksia

Scientific classification
- Kingdom: Plantae
- Clade: Tracheophytes
- Clade: Angiosperms
- Clade: Eudicots
- Order: Proteales
- Family: Proteaceae
- Genus: Banksia
- Subgenus: Banksia subg. Banksia

= Banksia subg. Banksia =

Subgenus of plants found in Australia

Banksia subg. Banksia is a valid botanic name for a subgenus of Banksia. As an autonym, it necessarily contains the type species of Banksia, B. serrata (saw banksia). Within this constraint, however, there have been various circumscriptions.

== Banksia verae ==
B. subg. Banksia can be traced back to Banksia verae, an unranked taxon published by Robert Brown in his 1810 Prodromus Florae Novae Hollandiae et Insulae Van Diemen. Under Brown's arrangement, Banksia was divided into two groups based on inflorescence shape. Banksia verae was defined as containing those Banksia taxa with the elongate flower spike typical of Banksia, and it thus contained all but one species. The remaining species, B. ilicifolia (Holly-leaved Banksia), has a dome-shaped head and so was placed alone in Isostylis.

Brown published a further eleven species in 1830, placing all of them in Banksia verae. The 1830 circumscription of Banksia verae was as follows:

Banksia

Banksia verae

B. pulchella
B. sphærocarpa
B. nutans
B. ericifolia
B. spinulosa
B. Cunninghamii (now B. spinulosa var. cunninghamii)
B. collina (now B. spinulosa var. collina)
B. occidentalis
B. littoralis
B. marginata
B. depressa (now B. marginata)
B. patula (now B. marginata)
B. australis (now B. marginata)
B. insularis (now B. marginata)
B. integrifolia
B. compar (now B. integrifolia subsp. compar)
B. verticillata
B. coccinea
B. paludosa
B. oblongifolia
B. latifolia (now B. robur)
B. marcescens (now B. praemorsa)
B. media
B. attenuata
B. Caleyi
B. Baueri
B. Menziesii
B. elatior (now B. aemula)
B. serrata
B. æmula
B. dentata
B. quercifolia
B. speciosa
B. Solandri
B. grandis
B. Baxteri
B. Goodii
B. prostrata (now B. gardneri)
B. repens
B. Dryandroides
B. Brownii

Isostylis (one species)

== Eubanksia ==
Banksia verae was renamed Eubanksia by Stephan Endlicher in his 1847 fourth supplement to Genera Plantarum Secundum Ordines Naturales Disposita, and this name was retained in Carl Meissner's 1856 arrangement. Meissner gave Eubanksia sectional rank, further dividing it into four series, B. ser. Abietinæ, B. ser. Salicinae, B. ser. Quercinae and B. ser. Dryandroideae. These series were defined in terms of leaf shape alone, and were hence all highly heterogeneous, with the exception of B. ser. Abietinæ, which contained only (but not all) species with hooked styles.

Meissner's 1856 circumscription of B. sect. Eubanksia was as follows:

Banksia

B. sect. Eubanksia

B. ser. Abietinæ

B. pulchella
B. Meisneri
B. sphærocarpa

B. sphaerocarpa var. glabrescens (now B. incana)

B. pinifolia (now B. leptophylla)
B. nutans
B. ericifolia
B. spinulosa
B. tricuspis

B. ser Salicinæ

B. cunninghamii (now B. spinulosa var. cunninghamii)
B. collina (now B. spinulosa var. collina)
B. occidentalis
B. littoralis
B. cylindrostachya (now B. attenuata)
B. lindleyana
B. marginata

B. marginata var. Cavanillesii (now B. marginata)
B. marginata var. microstachya (now B. marginata)
B. marginata var. humilis (now B. marginata)

B. depressa (now B. marginata)

B. depressa var. subintegra (now B. marginata)

B. patula (now B. marginata)
B. australis (now B. marginata)
B. Gunnii (now B. marginata)
B. insularis (now B. marginata)
B. integrifolia

B. integrifolia var. minor (now B. integrifolia subsp. integrifolia)
B. integrifolia var. major (now B. integrifolia subsp. integrifolia)
B. integrifolia var. dentata (now B. robur)

B. compar (now B. integrifolia subsp. compar)
B. paludosa
B. verticillata
B. media
B. attenuata
B. elatior (now B. aemula)
B. lævigata
B. Hookeriana
B. prionotes
B. Menziesii

B. ser. Quercinæ

B. coccinea
B. sceptrum
B. Baueri
B. ornata
B. latifolia (now B. robur)
B. marcescens (now B. praemorsa)
B. oblongifolia
B. serrata
B. æmula
B. Caleyi

B. caleyi var. sinuosa (now B. caleyi)

B. Lemanniana
B. quercifolia
B. dentata
B. prostrata (now B. gardneri)
B. Goodii
B. barbigera
B. repens
B. Solandri

B. solandri var. major (now B. solandri)

B. ser. Dryandroideæ

B. grandis
B. Baxteri
B. speciosa
B. Victoriæ
B. elegans
B. Candolleana
B. dryandroides
B. Brownii

B. sect. Isostylis (one species)

The top-level split into Eubanksia and Isostylis was abandoned by George Bentham in 1870. Instead, Bentham divided the genus into five section, retaining B. sect. Isostylis, but dividing the remaining species into four sections.

== B. subg. Banksia sensu George ==
In 1981, Alex George published a thorough revision of Banksia in his classic monograph The genus Banksia L.f. (Proteaceae). George reinstated Meissner's Eubanksia and Isostylis, giving them subgeneric rank. By this time, however, the rules of botanical nomenclature had been formalised in such a way that Eubanksia was required to take the autonym B. subg. Banksia.

George's arrangement was overturned in 1996 by Kevin Thiele and Pauline Ladiges, but in 1999 George published a slightly modified version in his treatment of Banksia for the Flora of Australia series of monographs. George's 1999 arrangement is not universally accepted, and accords poorly with recently published cladistic analyses, yet it remains the most recently published arrangement.

In George's taxonomic arrangement of Banksia, B. subg. Banksia is further divided into three sections, primarily on the shape of the style. B. sect. Banksia species have a straight or curved, but never hooked, style; this section contains about 50 species that are further divided into nine series. B. sect. Coccinea contains a single species, Banksia coccinea. B. sect. Oncostylis contains those species whose styles are hooked; it contains about 20 species, which are further divided into four series. It is circumscribed as follows:

Banksia

B. subg. Banksia

B. sect. Banksia

B. ser. Salicinae

B. dentata
B. aquilonia
B. integrifolia

B. integrifolia subsp. integrifolia
B. integrifolia subsp. compar
B. integrifolia subsp. monticola

B. plagiocarpa
B. oblongifolia
B. robur
B. conferta

B. conferta subsp. conferta
B. conferta subsp. penicillata

B. paludosa

B. paludosa subsp. astrolux
B. paludosa subsp. paludosa

B. marginata
B. canei
B. saxicola

B. ser. Grandes

B. grandis
B. solandri

B. ser. Banksia

B. serrata
B. aemula
B. ornata
B. baxteri
B. speciosa
B. menziesii
B. candolleana
B. sceptrum

B. ser. Crocinae

B. prionotes
B. burdettii
B. hookeriana
B. victoriae

B. ser. Prostratae

B. goodii
B. gardneri

B. gardneri var. gardneri
B. gardneri var. brevidentata
B. gardneri var. hiemalis

B. chamaephyton
B. blechnifolia
B. repens
B. petiolaris

B. ser. Cyrtostylis

B. media
B. praemorsa
B. epica
B. pilostylis
B. attenuata
B. ashbyi
B. benthamiana
B. audax
B. lullfitzii
B. elderiana
B. laevigata

B. laevigata subsp. laevigata
B. laevigata subsp. fuscolutea

B. elegans
B. lindleyana

B. ser. Tetragonae

B. lemanniana
B. caleyi
B. aculeata

B. ser. Bauerinae

B. baueri

B. ser. Quercinae

B. quercifolia
B. oreophila

B. sect. Coccinea

B. coccinea

B. sect. Oncostylis

B. ser. Spicigerae

B. spinulosa

B. spinulosa var. spinulosa
B. spinulosa var. collina
B. spinulosa var. neoanglica
B. spinulosa var. cunninghamii

B. ericifolia

B. ericifolia subsp. ericifolia
B. ericifolia subsp. macrantha

B. verticillata
B. seminuda
B. littoralis
B. occidentalis
B. brownii

B. ser. Tricuspidae

B. tricuspis

B. ser. Dryandroideae

B. dryandroides

B. ser. Abietinae

B. sphaerocarpa

B. sphaerocarpa var. sphaerocarpa
B. sphaerocarpa var. caesia
B. sphaerocarpa var. dolichostyla

B. micrantha
B. grossa
B. telmatiaea
B. leptophylla

B. leptophylla var. leptophylla
B. leptophylla var. melletica

B. lanata
B. scabrella
B. violacea
B. incana
B. laricina
B. pulchella
B. meisneri

B. meisneri subsp. meisneri
B. meisneri subsp. ascendens

B. nutans

B. nutans var. nutans
B. nutans var. cernuella

B. subg. Isostylis (3 species)

== B. subg. Banksia sensu Thiele and Ladiges ==
In 1996, Kevin Thiele and Pauline Ladiges published the results of a cladistic analysis of Banksia. They found George's arrangement to accord fairly closely with their inferred cladogram, so sought to publish a taxonomic arrangement that reflected their phylogeny whilst being minimally disruptive to the then-current arrangement. They accepted both of George's subgenera prior to the analysis, using each as an outgroup in the analysis of the other. Thus their analysis yielded little information about the circumscription and placement of B. subg. Banksia. They did find, however, that the subgenus was not monophyletic unless B. elegans (elegant banksia) was excluded. They ended up listing B. elegans and five other species as incertae sedis, but otherwise maintained George's circumscription of the subgenus.

In Thiele and Ladiges' taxonomic arrangement of Banksia, B. subg. Banksia is divided into twelve series. Its placement and circumscription may be summarised as follows:

Banksia

B. subg. Isostylis (three species)
B. elegans (incertae sedis)
B. subg. Banksia

B. ser. Tetragonae

B. elderiana
B. lemanniana
B. caleyi
B. aculeata

B. ser. Lindleyanae

B. lindleyana

B. ser. Banksia

B. subser. Banksia

B. ornata
B. serrata
B. aemula

B. subser. Cratistylis

B. candolleana
B. sceptrum
B. baxteri
B. speciosa
B. menziesii
B. burdettii
B. victoriae
B. hookeriana
B. prionotes

B. baueri (incertae sedis)
B. lullfitzii (incertae sedis)
B. attenuata (incertae sedis)
B. ashbyi (incertae sedis)
B. coccinea (incertae sedis)
B. ser. Prostratae

B. petiolaris
B. repens
B. chamaephyton
B. blechnifolia
B. hiemalis (now B. gardneri var. hiemalis)
B. gardneri
B. brevidentata (now B. gardneri var. brevidentata)
B. goodii

B. ser. Cyrtostylis

B. pilostylis
B. media
B. epica
B. praemorsa

B. ser. Ochraceae

B. benthamiana
B. audax
B. laevigata

B. laevigata subsp. laevigata
B. laevigata subsp. fuscolutea

B. ser. Grandes

B. grandis
B. solandri

B. ser. Salicinae

B. subser. Acclives

B. oblongifolia
B. plagiocarpa
B. robur
B. dentata

B. subser. Integrifoliae

B. marginata
B. conferta
B. penicillata (now B. conferta subsp. penicillata)
B. paludosa
B. canei
B. saxicola
B. integrifolia

B. integrifolia subsp. integrifolia
B. integrifolia subsp. monticola
B. integrifolia subsp. compar
B. integrifolia subsp. aquilonia (now B. aquilonia)

B. ser. Spicigerae

Banksia subser. Spinulosae

B. spinulosa

B. spinulosa var. spinulosa
B. spinulosa var. collina
B. spinulosa var. cunninghamii
B. spinulosa var. neoanglica

B. subser. Ericifoliae

B. ericifolia

B. ericifolia var. ericifolia
B. ericifolia var. macrantha

B. subser. Occidentales

B. occidentalis
B. brownii
B. seminuda
B. verticillata
B. littoralis

B. ser. Quercinae

B. quercifolia
B. oreophila

B. ser. Dryandroideae

B. dryandroides

B. ser. Abietinae

B. subser. Nutantes

B. nutans

B. nutans var. nutans
B. nutans var. cernuella

B. subser. Sphaerocarpae

B. grossa
B. dolichostyla (now B. sphaerocarpa var. dolichostyla)
B. micrantha
B. sphaerocarpa

B. sphaerocarpa var. sphaerocarpa
B. sphaerocarpa var. caesia

B. subser. Leptophyllae

B. telmatiaea
B. scabrella
B. leptophylla

B. leptophylla var. melletica
B. leptophylla var. leptophylla

B. lanata

B. subser. Longistyles

B. violacea
B. laricina
B. incana
B. tricuspis
B. pulchella
B. meisneri

B. meisneri var. meisneri
B. meisneri var. ascendens:

B. ser. Dryandra

== B. subg. Banksia sensu Mast and Thiele ==
In 2005, Austin Mast, Eric Jones and Shawn Havery published the results of their cladistic analyses of DNA sequence data for Banksia. They inferred a phylogeny very greatly different from the accepted taxonomic arrangement, including finding Banksia to be paraphyletic with respect to Dryandra. A new taxonomic arrangement was not published at the time, but early in 2007 Mast and Thiele initiated a rearrangement by transferring Dryandra to Banksia, and publishing B. subg. Spathulatae for the species having spoon-shaped cotyledons. Thus B. subg. Banksia was redefined as containing the species lacking spoon-shaped cotyledons. Mast and Thiele have foreshadowed publishing a full arrangement once DNA sampling of Dryandra is complete.
