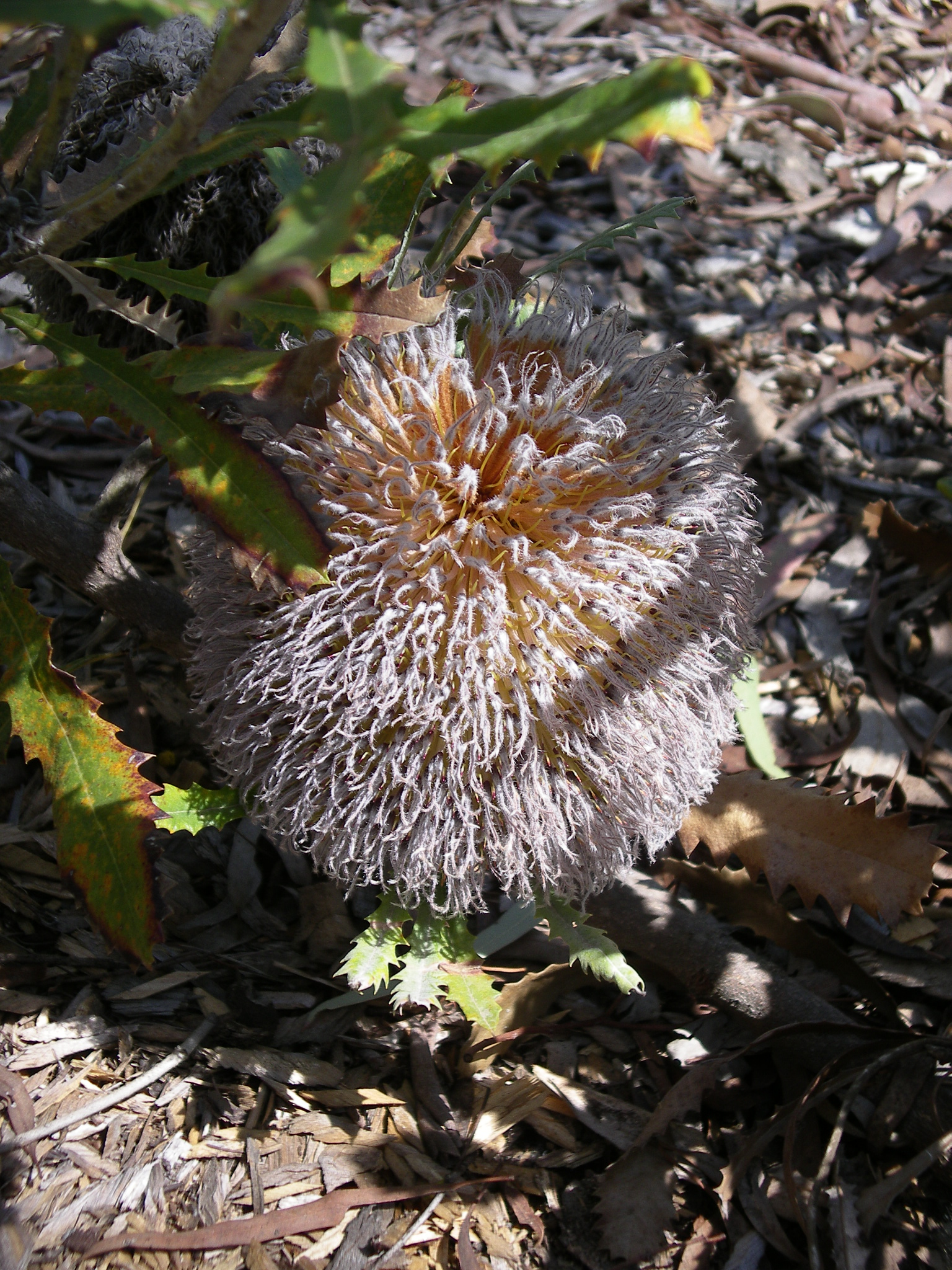
- Banksia baueri inflorescence

Conservation status
- Near Threatened (IUCN 3.1)

Scientific classification
- Kingdom: Plantae
- Clade: Tracheophytes
- Clade: Angiosperms
- Clade: Eudicots
- Order: Proteales
- Family: Proteaceae
- Genus: Banksia
- Species: B. baueri

Binomial name
- Banksia baueri R.Br.

Synonyms
- Sirmuellera baueri (R.Br.) Kuntze

= Banksia baueri =

Woolly banksia

Species of shrub native to Western Australia

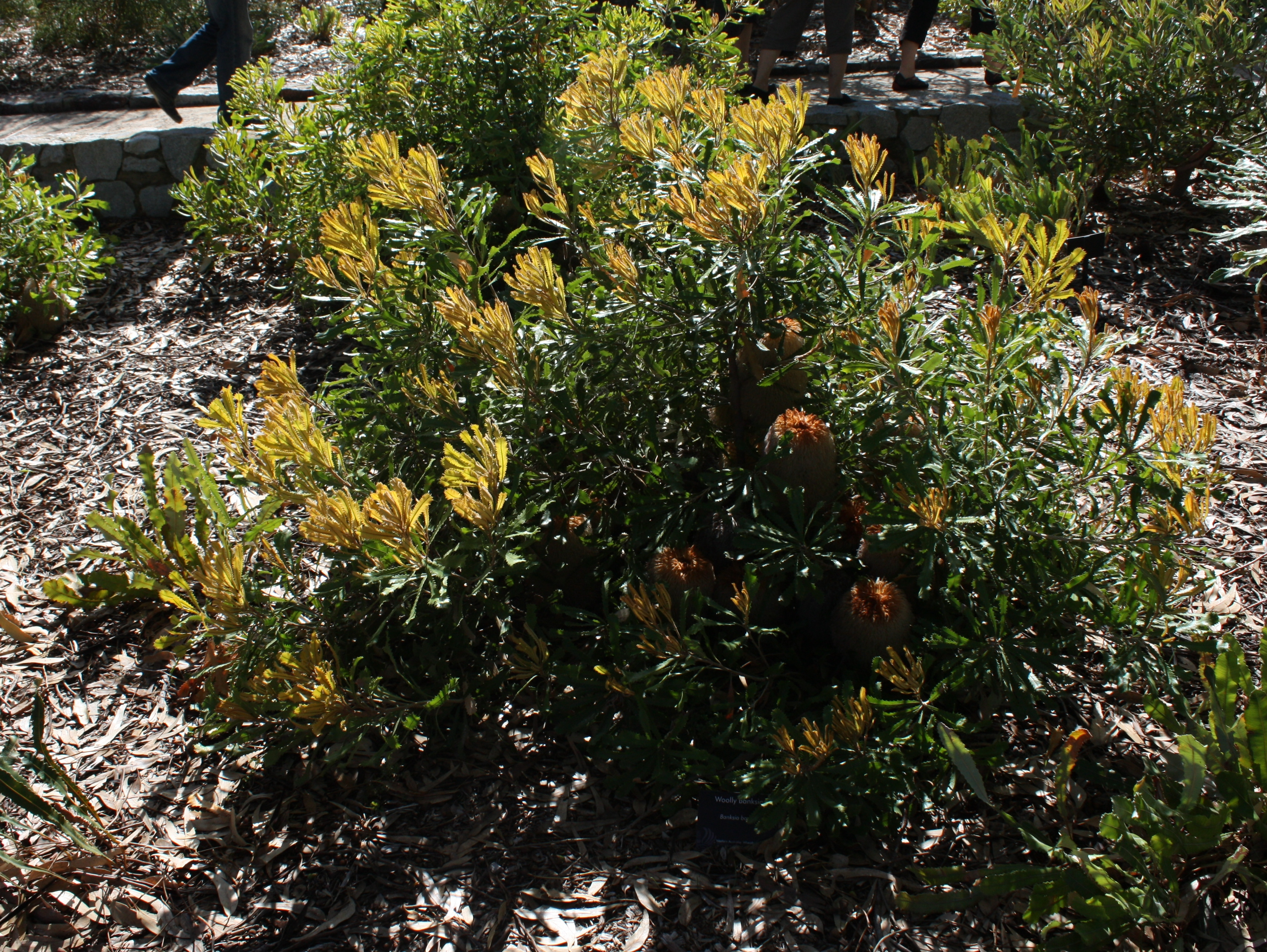
Habit in Kings Park, Western Australia

Banksia baueri, commonly known as the woolly banksia, is a species of shrub that is endemic to the southwest of Western Australia. It has serrated leaves and a distinctively large and hairy looking inflorescence with cream, yellow or brown flowers, and hairy fruit.

== Description ==
Banksia baueri grows as a many-branched spreading shrub reaching 0.5–2 m (1 ft 8 in – 6 ft 7 in) high, and 3 m (9.8 ft) wide but does not form a lignotuber. Its bark is thin and grey with long fissures, while new growth is covered in fine pale brown fur. New growth occurs in summer. The leaves are usually narrow egg-shaped with the narrower end towards the base, 40–130 mm (1.6–5.1 in) long and 5–35 mm (0.20–1.38 in) wide with serrated edges, tapering to a petiole 5–10 mm (0.20–0.39 in) long. The inflorescence develops over 5–6 months, and can reach 120–130 mm (4.7–5.1 in) in diameter, 170 mm (6.7 in) high and is borne on a short side branch. The flowers are cream, yellow or brown and hairy, the perianth 50–70 mm (2.0–2.8 in) long and the pistil 50–58 mm (2.0–2.3 in) long with a glabrous style. The fruit is a hairy, elliptical follicle 12–17 mm (0.47–0.67 in) long.

== Taxonomy ==
Robert Brown described Banksia baueri in 1830, after it had been collected by William Baxter at King Georges Sound in 1829. The description was published in Brown's supplement to his Prodromus. It was named for the brothers Austrian botanical artists Franz and Ferdinand Bauer, Ferdinand having travelled with Brown on his 1801–1805 voyage.

Under Brown's taxonomic arrangement, B. baueri was placed in subgenus Banksia verae, the "True Banksias", because the inflorescence is a typical Banksia flower spike. Banksia verae was renamed Eubanksia by Stephan Endlicher in 1847, and demoted to sectional rank by Carl Meissner in his 1856 classification. Meissner further divided Eubanksia into four series, with B. baueri placed in series Quercinae on the basis of its toothed leaves. When George Bentham published his 1870 arrangement in Flora Australiensis, he discarded Meissner's series, replacing them with four sections. B. baueri was placed in Cyrtostylis, a heterogeneous section containing 13 species that did not readily fit elsewhere. This arrangement would stand for over a century.

In 1891, Otto Kuntze, in his Revisio Generum Plantarum, rejected the generic name Banksia L.f., on the grounds that the name Banksia had previously been published in 1776 as Banksia J.R.Forst & G.Forst, referring to the genus now known as Pimelea. Kuntze proposed Sirmuellera as an alternative, referring to this species as Sirmuellera baueri. This application of the principle of priority was largely ignored by Kuntze's contemporaries, and Banksia L.f. was formally conserved and Sirmuellera rejected in 1940.

It is placed alone in series Banksia series Bauerinae. In his 1981 monograph on the genus, Alex George classified it in the reinstated but much-reduced series Quercinae, alongside Banksia quercifolia and B. oreophila. However he noted its follicles, which are beaked after they open, and cotyledon shape, did not fit with the other taxa and pondered an affinity with B. menziesii and B. sceptrum

Common names include woolly banksia, possum banksia, woolly-spiked banksia, pussy cat banksia or teddy bear banksia, all of which relate to the large furry flower spikes.

== Distribution and habitat ==
Banksia baueri is found in southern Western Australia in three disjunct areas - from Bremer Bay in the east to Jerdacuttup, on the south Stirling Plains, and to the northwest inland between Kweda and Tarin Rock. Plants grow in shrubland or mallee, on flat or genty sloping ground, on white or grey sand or on shallow sand over laterite or quartzite.

== Ecology ==
A 1985–86 field study in the Fitzgerald River National Park found it to be a main wintertime food source for the nectar-feeding honey possum (Tarsipes rostratus).

== Use in horticulture ==
Its unusual flower spikes are an attractive horticultural feature. It requires well-drained soil in full sun or part shade. Seeds do not require any treatment, and take 20 to 49 days to germinate.
