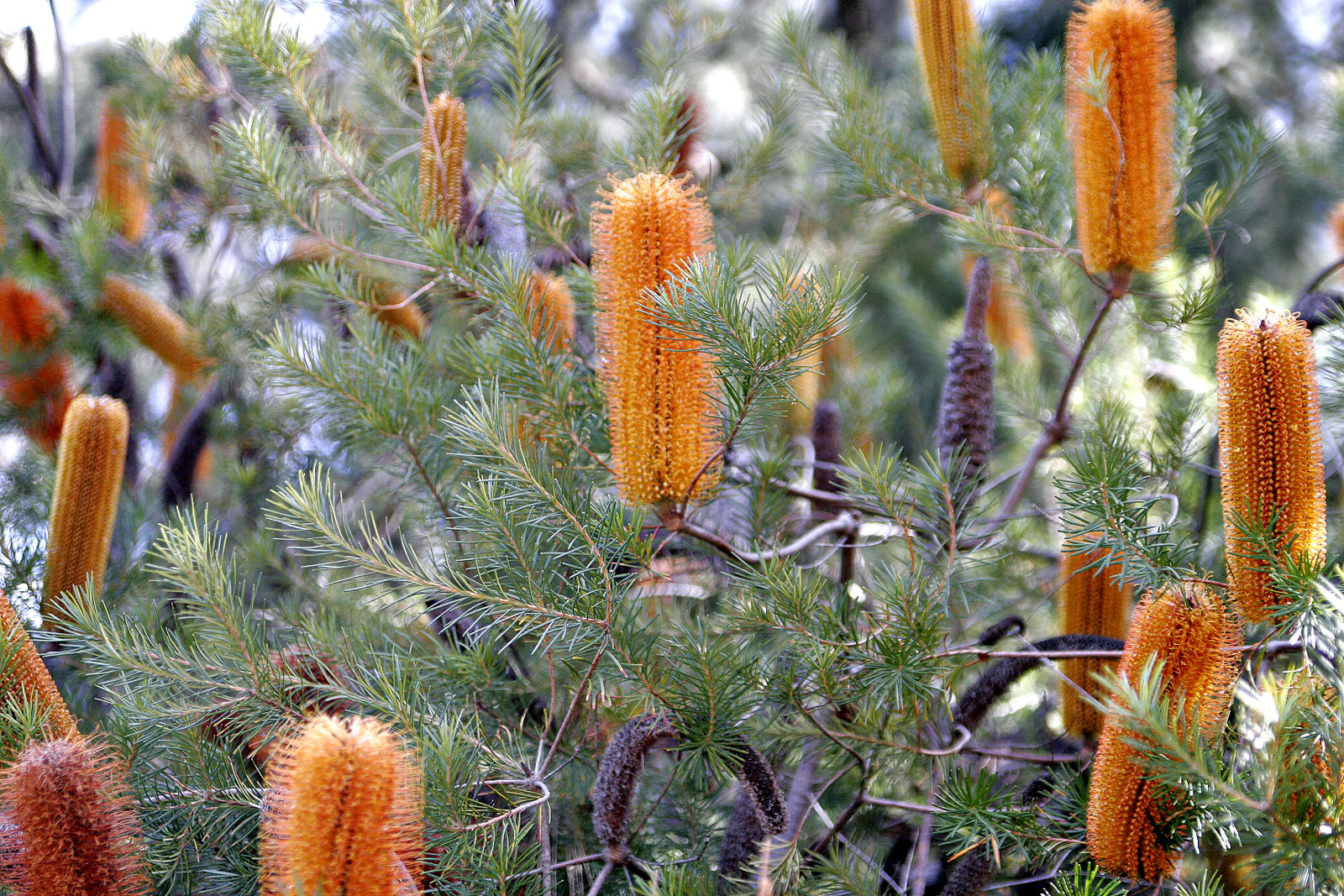
- Banksia ericifolia, a member of series Spicigerae

Scientific classification
- Kingdom: Plantae
- Clade: Tracheophytes
- Clade: Angiosperms
- Clade: Eudicots
- Order: Proteales
- Family: Proteaceae
- Genus: Banksia
- Subgenus: Banksia subg. Banksia
- Section: Banksia sect. Oncostylis
- Series: Banksia ser. Spicigerae; A. S. George

Species
- See text

= Banksia ser. Spicigerae =

Taxonomic series of Australian plants

Banksia ser. Spicigerae is a taxonomic series in the genus Banksia. It consists of the seven species in section Oncostylis that have cylindrical inflorescences. These range in form from small shrubs to tall trees. The leaves grow in either an alternate or whorled pattern, with various shape forms. The Spicigerae inflorescence is held erect, subtended by a whorl of branchlets, and retains a regular pattern until anthesis. The perianth limb is horizontal until anthesis, at which point the perianth opens from underneath. The pollen-presenter is ovoid or conical. The seed wings are not notched.

== Taxa ==
Five of the Spicigerae are endemic to southwest Western Australia. The other two, Banksia ericifolia (heath-leaved banksia) and Banksia spinulosa (hairpin banksia), are endemic to the east coast of Australia. It is therefore thought to be the oldest of the series, having developed before the onset of aridity in the Nullarbor Plain.

=== Species and subspecies ===
- B. spinulosa comprising:
  - B. s. var. collina
  - B. s. var. cunninghamii
  - B. s. var. neoanglica
  - B. s. var. spinulosa
- B. ericifolia comprising:
  - B. e. var. ericifolia
  - B. e. var. macrantha
- B. verticillata
- B. seminuda
- B. littoralis
- B. occidentalis
- B. brownii

== See also ==
- Taxonomy of Banksia
