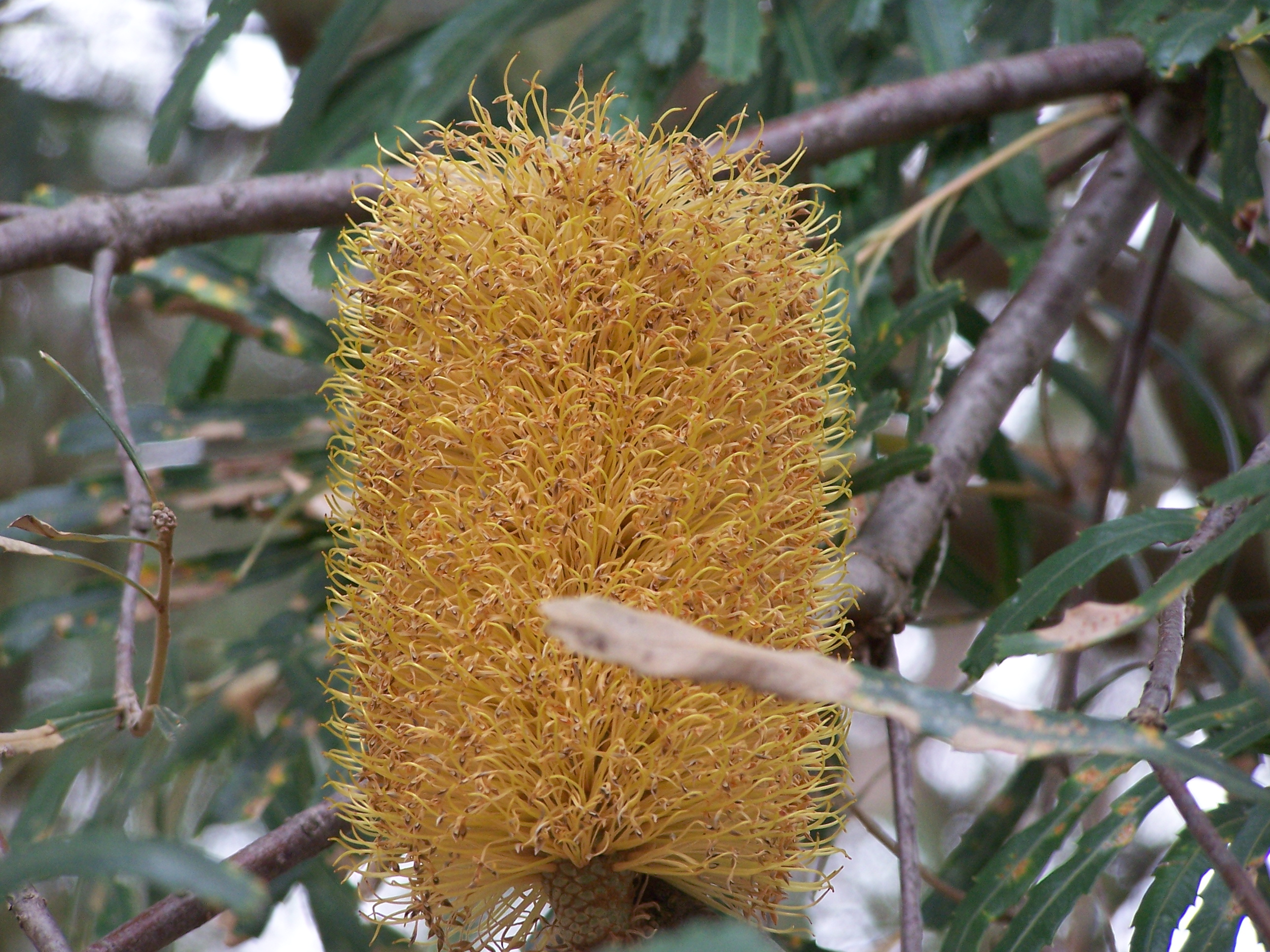
- Cultivated plant in Kings Park

Scientific classification
- Kingdom: Plantae
- Clade: Embryophytes
- Clade: Tracheophytes
- Clade: Spermatophytes
- Clade: Angiosperms
- Clade: Eudicots
- Order: Proteales
- Family: Proteaceae
- Genus: Banksia
- Subgenus: Banksia subg. Banksia
- Species: B. littoralis

Binomial name
- Banksia littoralis R.Br.

Synonyms
- Banksia littoralis R.Br. var. littoralis; Sirmuellera litoralis Kuntze orth. var.; Sirmuellera littoralis (R.Br.) Kuntze

= Banksia littoralis =

Swamp banksia

Species of tree endemic to Western Australia

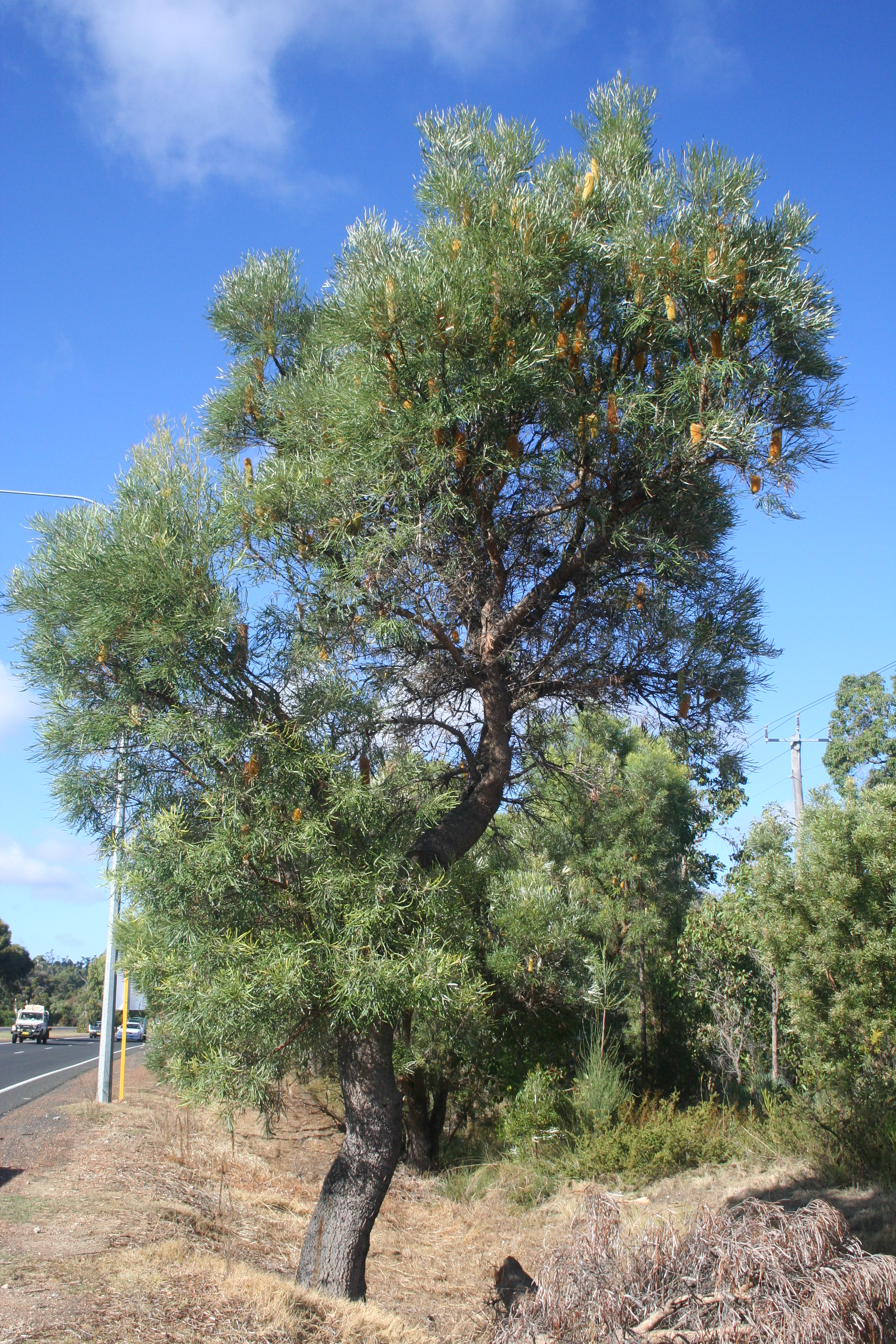
Banksia littoralis near Bunbury

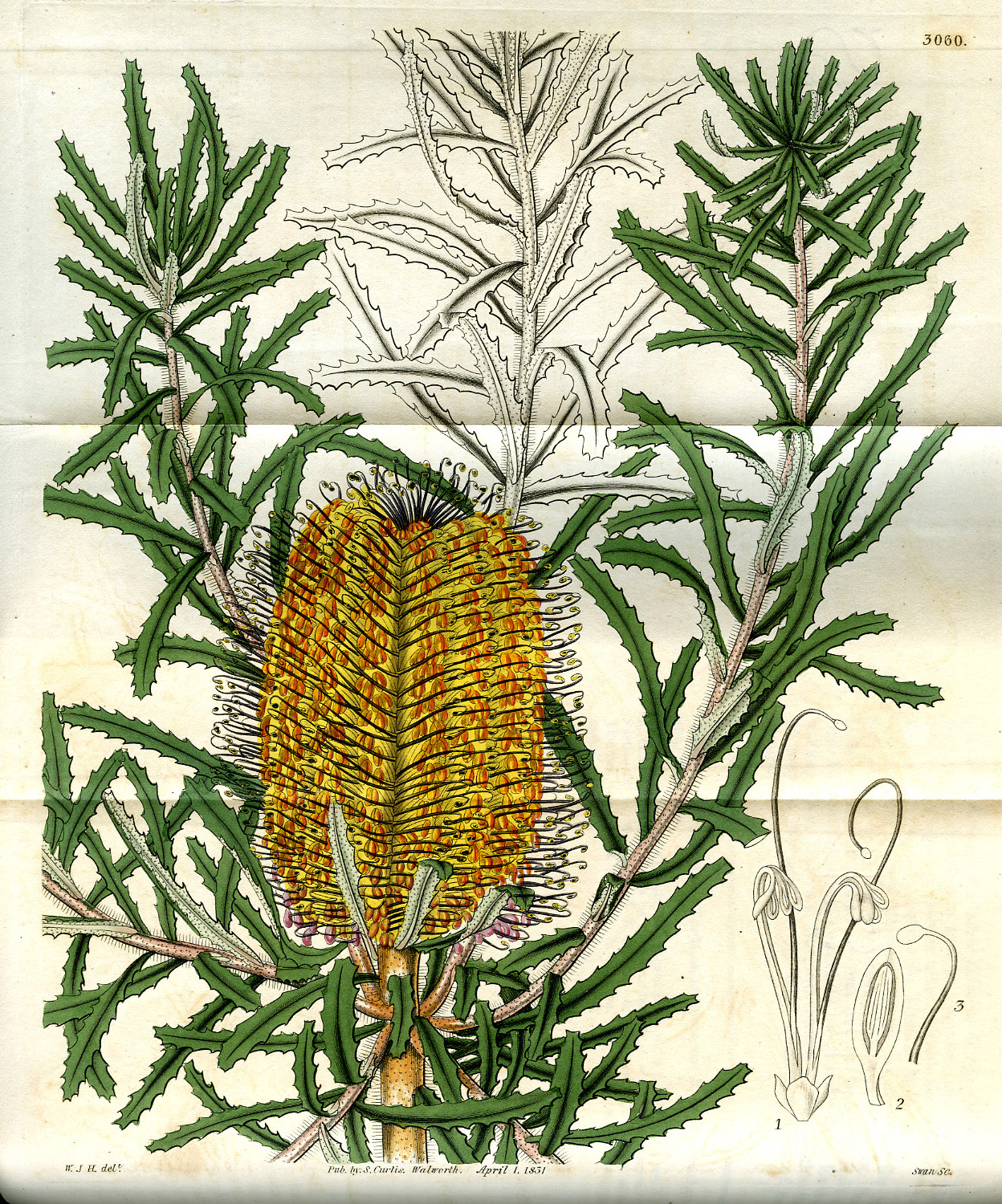
Illustration from The Botanical Magazine (1831)

Banksia littoralis, commonly known as the swamp banksia, swamp oak, river banksia or seaside banksia and the western swamp banksia, is a species of tree that is endemic to the south-west of Western Australia. The Noongar peoples know the plant as pungura, boongura or gwangia. It has rough, crumbly bark, linear, more or less serrated leaves arranged in whorls, yellow flowers and up to two hundred follicles in each head.

== Description ==
Banksia littoralis is a tree that typically grows up to around 1.5 to 12 m (4 ft 11 in to 39 ft 4 in), sometimes to 25 m (82 ft), with rough, crumbly bark and woolly-hairy stems. The leaves are arranged in whorls and are linear in shape, usually serrated in the upper half, 70–230 mm (2.8–9.1 in) long and 4–18 mm (0.16–0.71 in) wide on a petiole 5–10 mm (0.2–0.4 in) long. The flowers are arranged on a cylindrical head 70–200 mm (2.8–7.9 in) long and 60–70 mm (2.4–2.8 in) wide when the flowers open. The flowers are yellow with a perianth 25–27 mm (0.98–1.06 in) long and a hooked pistil 29–35 mm (1.1–1.4 in) long. Flowering occurs from March to July and the follicles are broadly linear to narrow elliptical, 11–22 mm (0.4–0.9 in) long, 2.5–8 mm (0.1–0.3 in) high and 4–8 mm (0.16–0.31 in) wide, the old flowers having fallen. There are sometimes up to two hundred follicles in each head.

== Taxonomy and naming ==
Banksia littoralis was first formally described by Robert Brown in Transactions of the Linnean Society of London from specimens he collected from around the shores of King George Sound, "especially of Princess Royal Harbour", in December 1801.

In 1891, Otto Kuntze, in his Revisio Generum Plantarum, rejected the generic name Banksia L.f., on the grounds that the name Banksia had previously been published in 1776 as Banksia J.R.Forst & G.Forst, referring to the genus now known as Pimelea. Kuntze proposed Sirmuellera as an alternative, referring to this species as Sirmuellera littoralis. This application of the principle of priority was largely ignored by Kuntze's contemporaries, and Banksia L.f. was formally conserved and Sirmuellera rejected in 1940.

Banksia littoralis appears most closely related to the other species of the series Spicigerae, such as B. seminuda and B. occidentalis, and is also quite closely related to B. verticillata, a smaller shrub with much thicker leaves.

== Distribution and habitat ==
Swamp banksia is found in coastal areas of southwestern Western Australia, including the Wheatbelt, Peel, South West and Great Southern regions, where it is often situated along creeks and rivers, in low-lying, seasonally damp areas like swamps and depressions, where it grows well in high moisture peaty to sandy soils. It is often part of low woodland communities and often is associated with Melaleuca preissiana and also in Eucalyptus gomphocephala forest communities, but rarely is it found as a part of low coastal kwongan communities. The range extends from around Mount Lesueur in the north to around Cape Leeuwin in the southwest, extending east to around Two Peoples Bay and the Stirling Range.

== Ecology ==
=== Response to fire ===
This banksia releases its seeds from the follicles as they mature and the plant responds to fire by resprouting from epicormic buds.

== Use in horticulture ==
Banksia littoralis is relatively easy to grow. It is possibly not as sensitive to dieback as other western banksias. Seeds do not require any treatment, and take 20 to 36 days to germinate.
