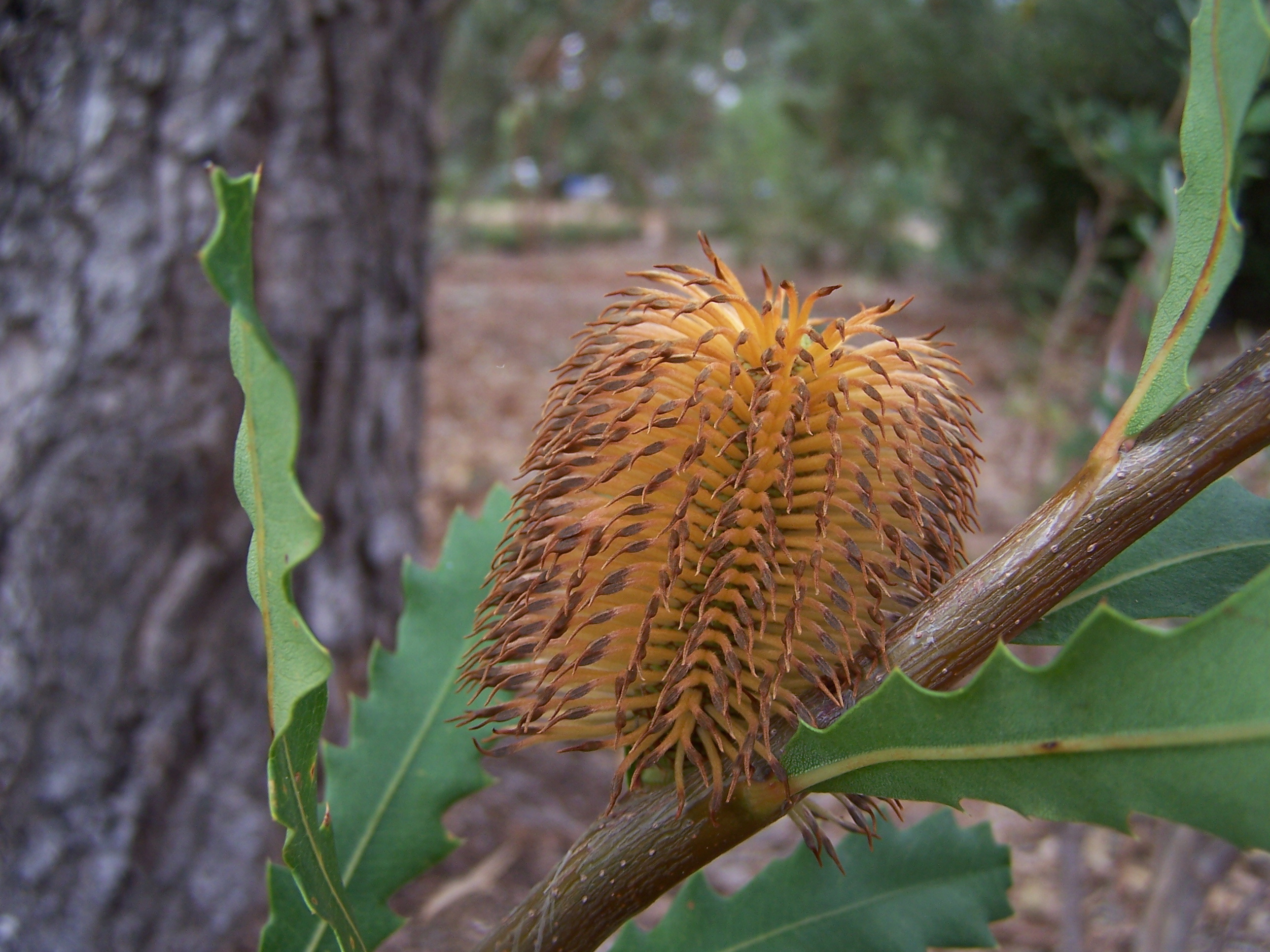
- Banksia quercifolia in Kings Park

Scientific classification
- Kingdom: Plantae
- Clade: Embryophytes
- Clade: Tracheophytes
- Clade: Spermatophytes
- Clade: Angiosperms
- Clade: Eudicots
- Order: Proteales
- Family: Proteaceae
- Genus: Banksia
- Subgenus: Banksia subg. Banksia
- Species: B. quercifolia

Binomial name
- Banksia quercifolia R.Br.

Synonyms
- Dryandra quercifolia R.Br. var. quercifolia; Sirmuellera quercifolia (R.Br.) Kuntze

= Banksia quercifolia =

Oak-leaved banksia

Species of shrub native to Western Australia

Banksia quercifolia, commonly known as the oak-leaved banksia, is a species of shrub that is endemic to the southwestern coast of Western Australia. It has smooth, greenish bark, wavy, wedge-shaped, serrated leaves, yellow, orange or brown flowers in cylindrical spikes, followed by broadly linear follicles surrounded by the remains of the flowers.

== Description ==
Banksia quercifolia is a shrub that typically grows to a height of 0.5 to 3 m (1 ft 8 in to 9 ft 10 in). It does not form a lignotuber. It has smooth, greenish brown bark that becomes lightly tessellated and grey as it ages. It has wavy, serrated, narrow wedge-shaped leaves 30–150 mm (1.2–5.9 in) long and 10–40 mm (0.39–1.57 in) wide on a petiole 1–4 mm (0.039–0.157 in) long. The flowers are arranged in a cylindrical spike 20–100 mm (0.79–3.94 in) long and 35–45 mm (1.4–1.8 in) wide when the flowers open. The flowers are yellow, orange or brown with the perianth 23–27 mm (0.91–1.06 in) long and a stiff, gently curved pistil 17–21 mm (0.67–0.83 in) long. Flowering occurs from March to November and up to thirty-five follicles develop in each head surrounded by the remains of the flowers. The follicles are broadly linear and wavy, 15–20 mm (0.59–0.79 in) long, 11–15 mm (0.43–0.59 in) high and 4–6 mm (0.16–0.24 in) wide.

== Taxonomy ==
The type specimen of B. quercifolia was collected by Robert Brown from around King George Sound in December 1801 when Brown was the botanist aboard HMS Investigator captained by Matthew Flinders. The species was formally described by Brown in 1810 in the Transactions of the Linnean Society of London.

In 1869, Ferdinand von Mueller described two varieties of B. quercifolia in Fragmenta phytographiae Australiae but the names, var. integrifolia and var. quercifolia are not accepted by the Australian Plant Census.

== Distribution and habitat ==
Oak-leaved banksia occurs on the south coast of Western Australia from D'Entrecasteaux National Park in the west to Mount Manypeaks in the east where it is commonly grows in depressions, seasonally wet flats and along the margins of swamps, in white or grey peaty sandy soils.

== Ecology ==
An assessment of the potential impact of climate change on this species found that its range is likely to contract by between 50% and 80% by 2080, depending on the severity of the change.

== Use in horticulture ==
Banksia quercifolia is a fast-growing, bushy shrub that flowers within five years from seed. The flowers are sometimes hidden but are numerous and persist for many years. Because of its natural habitat, it may tolerate more moisture than other banksias. Seeds do not require any treatment, and take 25 to 40 days to germinate.
