= Banksia sect. Eubanksia =

Obsolete section of Australian plants

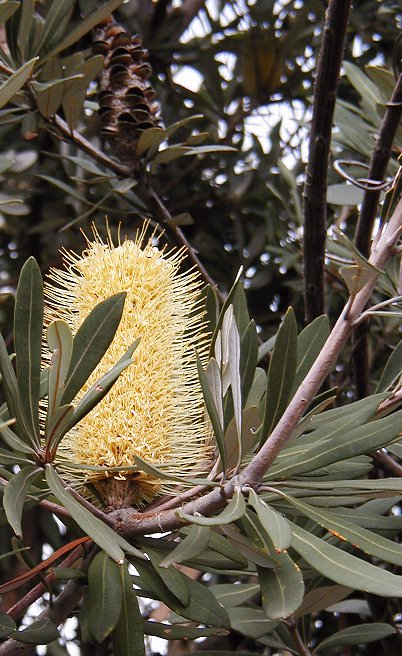
B. integrifolia (coast banksia), one of the three species in George Bentham's circumscription of B. sect. Banksia

Banksia sect. Eubanksia is an obsolete section of Banksia. There have been two circumscriptions, one of which is synonymous with the recently abandoned B. subg. Banksia sensu Alex George, the other having no modern equivalent.

The name Eubanksia was first published without rank by Stephan Endlicher in 1847. He published it as a replacement name for Robert Brown's Banksia verae, the "true banksias". In Brown's taxonomic arrangement of Banksia, Banksia verae was defined as comprising all species with a typical Banksia flower spike, and thus contained all known species except B. ilicifolia (holly-leaved banksia), which was unusual in having domed flower heads. Brown's circumscription of Banksia verae was retained for Eubanksia by Endlicher, and again by Carl Meissner, who gave Eubanksia sectional rank in his 1856 arrangement. Meissner divided B. sect. Eubanksia into four series, on the basis of leaf characters: B. ser. Abietinae, B. ser. Salicinae, B. ser. Quercinae and B. ser. Dryandroideae.

George Bentham published a new arrangement of Banksia in 1870, dividing Banksia into five sections. He appropriated B. sect. Eubanksia for a section containing only B. marginata (silver banksia), B. dentata (tropical banksia) and B. integrifolia (coast banksia), claiming that "the three species here included... are so closely allied and so frequently connected by intermediates, that they might almost be considered as varieties of a single one." Thus Bentham's circumscription was completely unrelated to that of Brown, Endlicher and Meissner.

B. sect. Eubanksia fell into disuse in 1981, when Alex George published his arrangement in The genus Banksia L.f. (Proteaceae). He reverted to the circumscription of Brown, Endlicher and Meissner, but by this time the rules of botanical nomenclature had been formalised in such a way that Brown's Banksia verae had to be given the autonym B. subg. Banksia; thus Endlicher's unranked Eubanksia and Meissner's section Eubanksia are now considered nomenclatural synonyms of B. subg. Banksia sensu George. This circumscription was retained in Thiele and Ladiges' 1996 arrangement, and in George's 1999 arrangement, but was finally abandoned in 2007 with the publication of B. subg. Banksia sensu Austin Mast and Kevin Thiele.

On the other hand, Bentham's circumscription of B. sect. Eubanksia has no modern equivalent. The three species placed in that section by Bentham were all placed by George in B. ser. Salicinae, and retained in that series under Thiele and Ladiges' 1996 arrangement. In both arrangements, however, the series contains a number of other species, and Bentham's three species are not considered particularly closely related.
