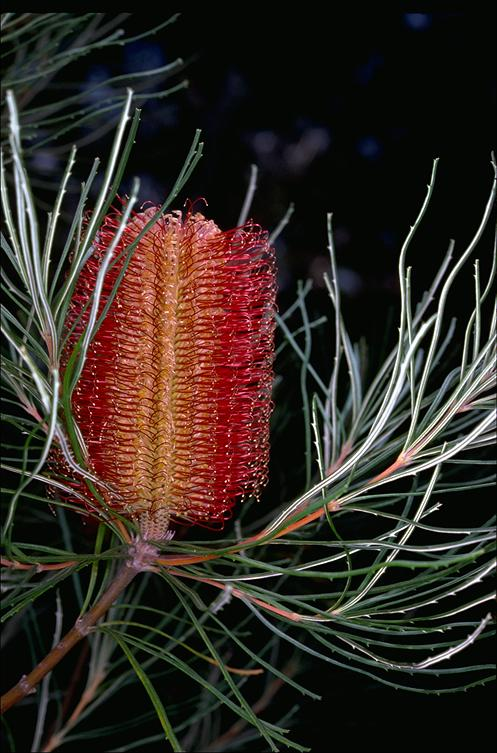
- In the ANBG

Scientific classification
- Kingdom: Plantae
- Clade: Tracheophytes
- Clade: Angiosperms
- Clade: Eudicots
- Order: Proteales
- Family: Proteaceae
- Genus: Banksia
- Subgenus: Banksia subg. Banksia
- Species: B. occidentalis

Binomial name
- Banksia occidentalis R.Br.

Synonyms
- Banksia occidentalis subsp. formosa Hopper; Banksia occidentalis R.Br. subsp. occidentalis; Sirmuellera occidentalis (R.Br.) Kuntze

= Banksia occidentalis =

Red swamp banksia

Species of shrub endemic to Western Australia

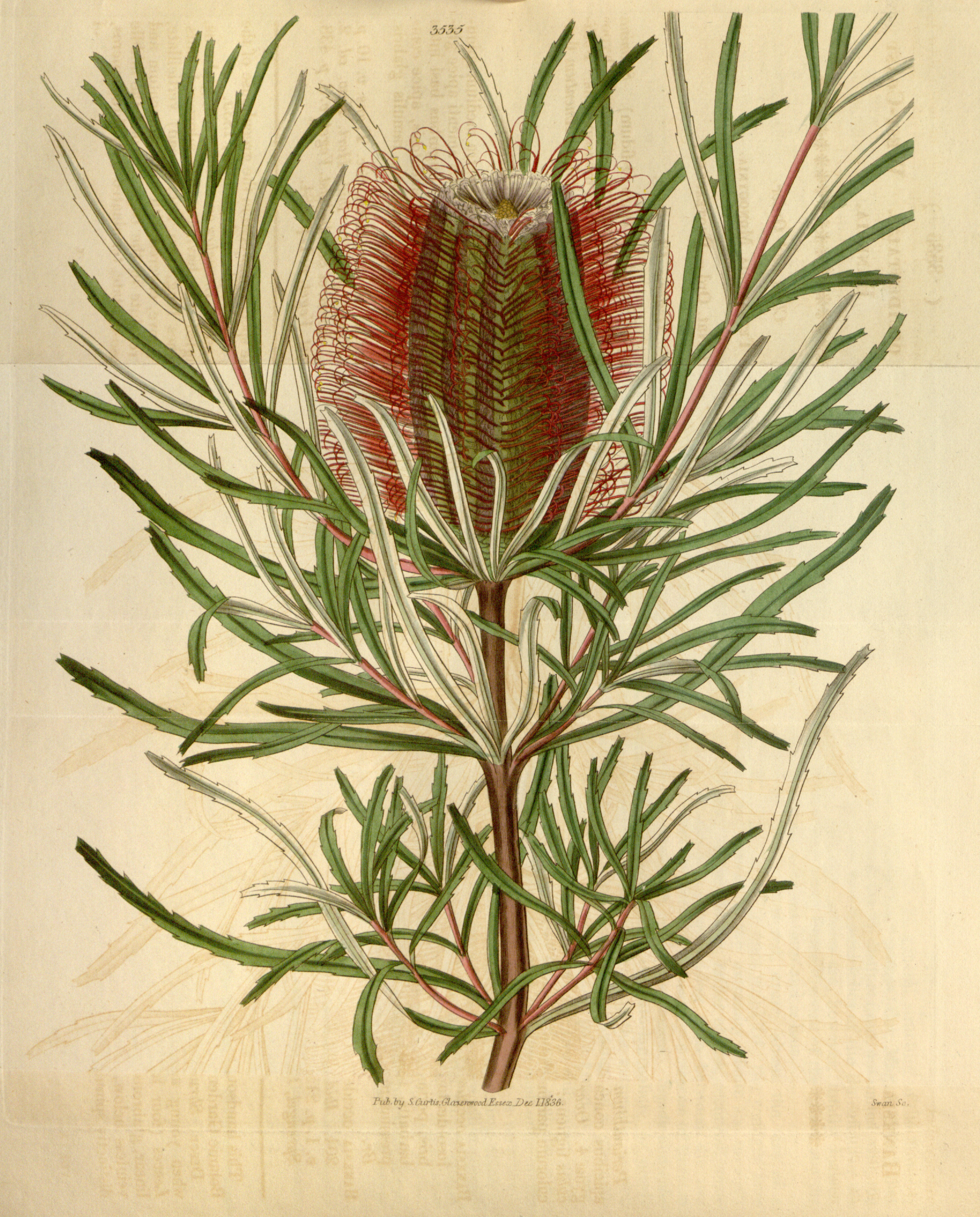
Illustration from Curtis's Botanical Magazine

Banksia occidentalis, commonly known as the red swamp banksia, is a species of shrub or small tree that is endemic to the south coast of Western Australia. It has smooth bark, linear, sparsely serrated leaves, golden flowers in a cylindrical spike, and later up to sixty follicles in each spike.

== Description ==
Banksia occidentalis is a shrub or small tree that typically grows to a height of 1–7 m (3 ft 3 in – 23 ft 0 in) and has smooth bark but does not form a lignotuber. The leaves are linear, sparsely serrated, whorled, 40–130 mm (1.6–5.1 in) long, 2–3 mm (0.08–0.1 in) wide on a petiole 1–5 mm (0.04–0.2 in) long. The flowers are arranged in a cylindrical spike 40–140 mm (1.6–5.5 in) long and 65–75 mm (2.6–3.0 in) wide at flowering. The flowers are gold-coloured with red styles, the perianth 17–18 (0.7 in) long and the pistil 29–35 mm (1.1–1.4 in) long and hooked. Flowering occurs from April to May or from August to November or January and the follicles are elliptical, 1–18 mm (0.04–0.71 in) long, 4–7 mm (0.16–0.28 in) high and 3–7 mm (0.12–0.28 in) wide. Up to sixty follicles form in each spike, the old flowers having fallen.

== Taxonomy and naming ==
Banksia occidentalis was first formally described in 1810 by Robert Brown in Transactions of the Linnean Society of London. The specific epithet (occidentalis) is a Latin word meaning 'western', referring to the distribution of this species relative to the related B. spinulosa. George placed this species in section Oncostylis, series Spicigerae.

== Distribution and habitat ==
Red swamp banksia occurs along the south coast of Western Australia between Augusta and Cape Arid National Park where it grows in shrubland or woodland, usually on the edges of swamps but sometimes also on coastal dunes.

== Ecology ==
A 1980 field study at Cheyne Beach showed it to be pollinated by the New Holland honeyeater and white-cheeked honeyeater.

== Conservation status ==
This banksia is listed as "not threatened" by the Western Australian Government Department of Parks and Wildlife.

== Use in horticulture ==
Seeds do not require any treatment, and take 21 to 47 days to germinate. The species was observed to be in cultivation in England in the gardens of Chiswick House in 1834.
