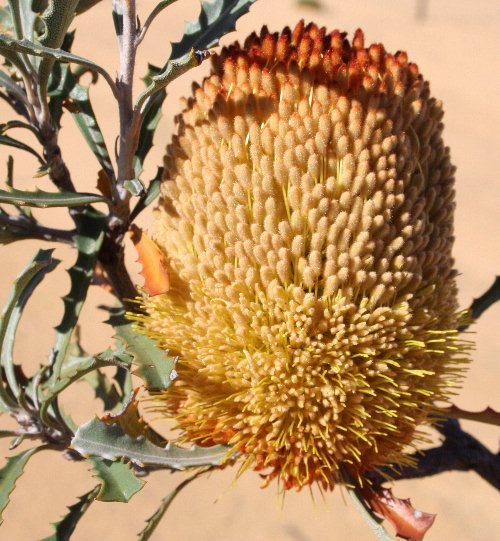
- B. audax, a member of B. ser. Ochraceae

Scientific classification
- Kingdom: Plantae
- Clade: Tracheophytes
- Clade: Angiosperms
- Clade: Eudicots
- Order: Proteales
- Family: Proteaceae
- Genus: Banksia
- Subgenus: Banksia subg. Banksia
- Series: Banksia ser. Ochraceae; K.R.Thiele

Species
- See text

= Banksia ser. Ochraceae =

Taxonomic series of Australian plants

Banksia ser. Ochraceae is a valid botanic name for a taxonomic series within the plant genus Banksia. It was published by Kevin Thiele in 1996, but discarded by Alex George in 1999.

== Cladistics ==
The name came about after a cladistic analysis of Banksia by Thiele and Pauline Ladiges yielded a phylogeny somewhat at odds with the arrangement of Alex George. They found George's B. ser. Cyrtostylis to be "widely polyphyletic", with six of its fourteen taxa occurring singly in locations throughout the cladogram; these were transferred to other series or left incertae sedis. The remaining eight taxa formed a clade, which further resolved into two subclades:

- - B. pilostylis
  - - B. media
    - B. epica
    - B. praemorsa
- - B. benthamiana
  - B. audax
  - - B. laevigata subsp. laevigata
    - B. laevigata subsp. fuscolutea

== Taxonomy ==
Thiele and Ladiges preferred to give series rank to the subclades, rather than the entire clade, so they transferred the taxa of the second clade into a new series, retaining only the taxa of the first clade in B. ser. Cyrtostylis. The new series was given the name B. ser. Ochraceae, from the Latin ochraceae ("ochre-coloured"), in reference to the colour of the inflorescences of most species in that series. It was formally defined as containing those species with "linear-terete pollen-presenters that are scarcely distinct from the style, very small, narrowly flabellate-tridentate early seedling leaves, and often browning-orange inflorescences". B. benthamiana (Bentham's banksia) was designated the type species.

The placement and circumscription of B. ser. Ochraceae in Thiele and Ladiges' arrangement of Banksia may be summarised as follows:

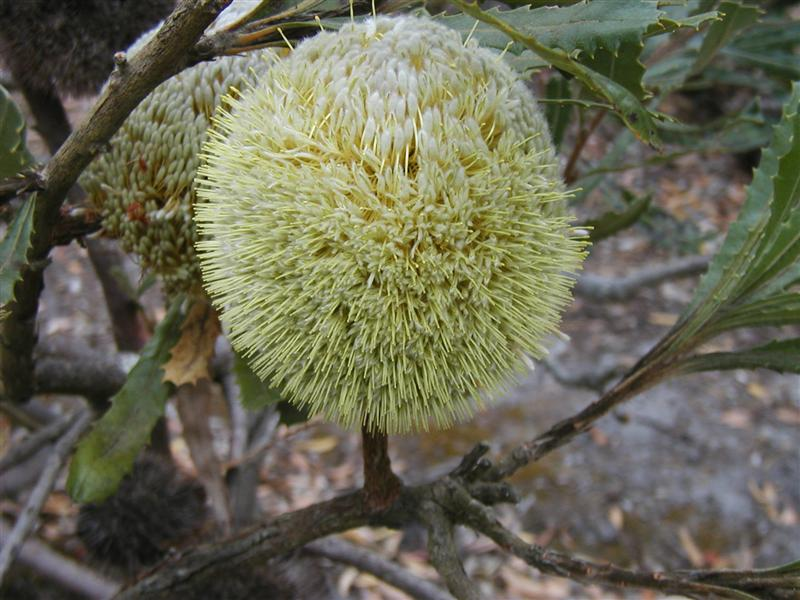
B. laevigata subsp. laevigata

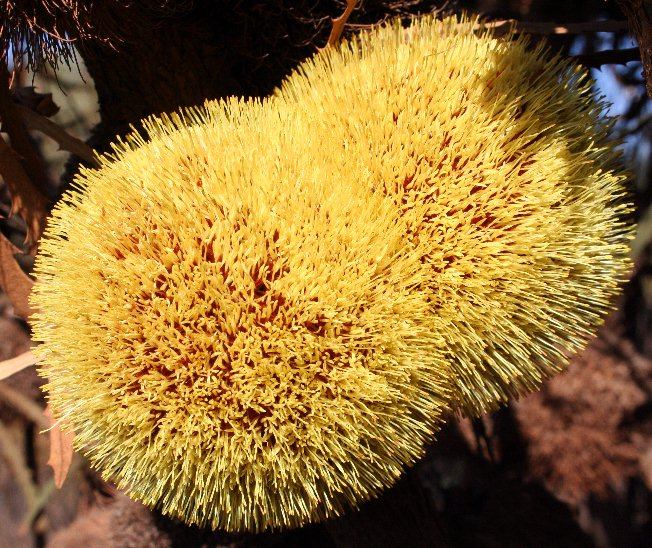
B. laevigata subsp. fuscolutea

Banksia

B. subg. Isostylis (3 species)
B. elegans (incertae sedis)
B. subg. Banksia

B. ser. Tetragonae (4 species)
B. ser. Lindleyanae (1 species)
B. ser. Banksia (2 subseries, 12 species)
B. baueri (incertae sedis)
B. lullfitzii (incertae sedis)
B. attenuata (incertae sedis)
B. ashbyi (incertae sedis)
B. coccinea (incertae sedis)
B. ser. Prostratae (8 species)
B. ser. Cyrtostylis (4 species)
B. ser. Ochraceae

B. benthamiana
B. audax
B. laevigata

B. laevigata subsp. laevigata
B. laevigata subsp. fuscolutea

B. ser. Grandes (2 species)
B. ser. Salicinae (2 series, 11 species, 4 subspecies)
B. ser. Spicigerae (3 series, 7 species, 6 varieties)
B. ser. Quercinae (2 species)
B. ser. Dryandroideae (1 species)
B. ser. Abietinae (4 subseries, 15 species, 8 varieties)

Thiele and Ladiges' arrangement remained current only until 1999, when it was overturned by George.

== Recent developments ==
Since 1998, Austin Mast has been publishing results of ongoing cladistic analyses of DNA sequence data for the subtribe Banksiinae. His analyses suggest a phylogeny that is rather different from previous taxonomic arrangements. With respect to B. ser. Ochraceae, Mast's results differ somewhat from the arrangement of Thiele and Ladiges. B. benthamiana and B. audax appear to be closely related, but B. laevigata forms only one of three polytomous sister clades to it, and the clade corresponding to Thiele and Ladiges' B. ser. Cyrtostylis is not particularly close.

Early in 2007 Mast and Thiele initiated a rearrangement of Banksia by transferring Dryandra into it, and publishing B. subg. Spathulatae for the species having spoon-shaped cotyledons; in this way they also redefined the autonym B. subg. Banksia. All members of B. ser. Ochraceae fall within Mast and Thiele's B. subg. Banksia, but nothing further has been published. Mast and Thiele have foreshadowed publishing a full arrangement once DNA sampling of Dryandra is complete.
