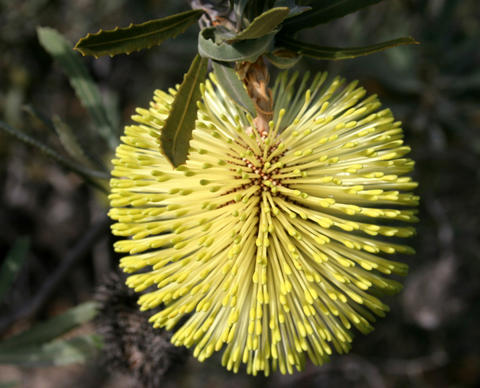

Scientific classification
- Kingdom: Plantae
- Clade: Tracheophytes
- Clade: Angiosperms
- Clade: Eudicots
- Order: Proteales
- Family: Proteaceae
- Genus: Banksia
- Species: B. rosserae

Binomial name
- Banksia rosserae Olde & Marriott

= Banksia rosserae =

Species of shrub endemic to Western Australia

Banksia rosserae is a recently described species of Banksia. Endemic to inland Western Australia, it is the only Banksia species to occur solely within the arid zone.

The species was originally discovered in September 2000 by John Cullen on an "orange sand dune". In 2001, Peter Olde and Neil Marriott, along with Keith Alcock, visited the area, and Alcock discovered the specimens. In January 2002, Kevin Collins and John Cullen discovered six more plants around 20 kilometres (12 mi) from the first discovery for a total of 27 plants. It wasn't until 2006, after a rain, that the plants flowered.

It has been suggested that the species be placed on the Department of Environment and Conservation's Declared Rare and Priority Flora List. There is no current listing on the Rare or Threatened Australian Plants (ROTAP) system or listed in the Environment Protection and Biodiversity Conservation Act 1999 (EPBC).

== Description ==
B. rosserae grows as a multi-stemmed shrub 2.5 to 3 metres (8.2 to 9.8 ft) high, and 3 to 4 metres (9.8 to 13.1 ft) wide. The trunks are from 10 to 15 centimetres (3.9 to 5.9 in) in diameter. Unusually for Banksia species, the grey bark is papery and flaky. The leaves are dark green, 5 to 12 centimetres (2.0 to 4.7 in) long and 5 to 12 millimetres (0.20 to 0.47 in) wide, with serrated margins. Flowers are yellow and occur in Banksia's distinctive flower spikes; these are approximately spherical, with a diameter of about 5 centimetres (2 in). The "cones" have a hairy appearance due to the retention of old flower parts. They typically contain from twelve to twenty follicles, most of which do not open until stimulated to do so by fire.

== Taxonomy ==
=== Taxonomic history ===
Reports of who first discovered B. rosserae are somewhat contradictory. Peter Olde and Neil Marriott acknowledge Ann Pilkington of Kirkalocka, "who discovered Banksia rosserae and who drew it to our attention through various third parties." However, Kevin Collins states that it was first discovered in September 2000 by a Grevillea enthusiast named John Cullen. According to Collins, Cullen had visited Kirkalocka in search of an undescribed Grevillea species mentioned in the writings of Charles Gardner (now published as G. kirkalocka); in addition to finding the Grevillea, he also found two B. rosserae plants growing on the top of an orange sand dune.

Irrespective of who first discovered it, its presence in the area was reported to Peter Olde and Neil Marriott. In 2001, Olde, Marriott and Keith Alcock visited the area in search of the undescribed Grevillea species. While there, they also searched for the Banksia, and eventually Alcock located two specimens growing on top of a dune. The plants were clearly an undescribed species, so specimens were collected so that a formal description of the species could be published. The following year it was published as Banksia rosserae Olde & Marriott. The name honours Celia Rosser, an illustrator, whose three-volume monograph The Banksias has been acclaimed as one of 20th century's great works of botanical illustration.

In January 2002, Kevin Collins and John Cullen undertook a search for more plants, locating a clump of six plants about 20 kilometres (12 mi) from the original two, and a further 18 plants on crown land adjacent to Kirkalocka. No flowering specimen was seen during these visits; indeed, no-one knew what the flower looked like until 2006. In March of that year, storms associated with Cyclone Glenda dumped a year's worth of rain in the area in a single day, and shortly afterwards, flowers began to form. Two months later, a party of botanists and Banksia enthusiasts visited the area, and observed the flowers for the first time.

=== Infrageneric placement ===
B. rosserae's relationship to other Banksia species is uncertain. Its leaves are virtually indistinguishable from narrow-leaved forms of B. laevigata (Tennis Ball Banksia), and like that species it has condensed, roughly spherical inflorescences, and slender styles. However, unlike B. laevigata it has a lignotuber, and terminal inflorescences that hang down instead of being held erect. The lignotuber suggests an affinity with B. lullfitzii, while the pendulous inflorescences suggest a relationship with the Banksia ser. Tetragonae series.

Olde and Marriott provisionally placed it in subgenus Banksia because its inflorescences take the form of Banksia's characteristic flower spikes; Banksia sect. Banksia because of its straight styles; and Banksia ser. Cyrtostylis because it has slender flowers. It was placed alongside B. laevigata, but with the proviso that "we have perceived a close relationship between Banksia laevigata and Banksia rosserae which a more informed study may find superficial."

B. rosserae's current placement within Banksia may be summarised as follows:

Banksia

B. subg. Banksia

B. sect. Banksia

B. ser. Salicinae (11 species, 7 subspecies)
B. ser. Grandes (2 species)
B. ser. Banksia (8 species)
B. ser. Crocinae (4 species)
B. ser. Prostratae (6 species, 3 varieties)
B. ser. Cyrtostylis

B. media
B. praemorsa
B. epica
B. pilostylis
B. attenuata
B. ashbyi
B. benthamiana
B. audax
B. lullfitzii
B. rosserae
B. elderiana
B. laevigata (2 subspecies)
B. elegans
B. lindleyana

B. ser. Tetragonae (3 species)
B. ser. Bauerinae (1 species)
B. ser. Quercinae (2 species)

B. sect. Coccinea (1 species)
B. sect. Oncostylis (4 series, 22 species, 4 subspecies, 11 varieties)

B. subg. Isostylis (3 species)

A 2013 molecular study by Cardillo and colleagues using chloroplast DNA found that B. rosserae was sister species to a clade made up of Banksia meisneri adscendens and Banksia pulchella, and the three together were sister to Banksia meisneri meisneri.

== Distribution ==
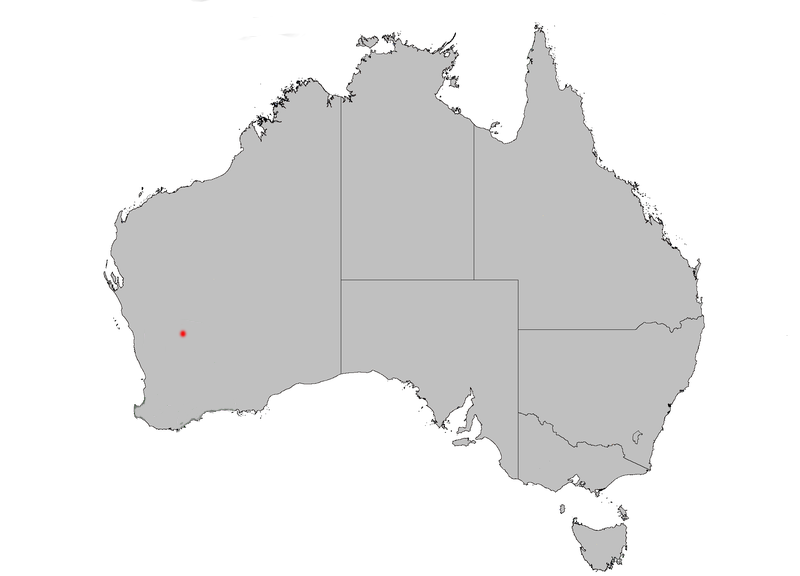
Distribution of Banksia rosserae

Banksia rosserae is known only from an area south-south-east of Mount Magnet in inland Western Australia. There are 27 plants known, all occurring within a radius of about 20 kilometres (12 mi). The area is around 200 kilometres (125 mi) from where other Banksia species are known to occur, representing "a significant extension of range into the arid zone and a significant geographic disjunction for the genus."

Although most of the land around Mount Magnet has the heavy clay soil and Acacia aneura (Mulga) scrub common throughout semi-arid Western Australia, the area on which B. rosserae occurs is unusual in having deep yellow sand and laterite. It occurs there with mallee Eucalyptus species, over open heath of Grevillea, Hakea, Leptospermum, Melaleuca, Cryptandra and Triodia species. Thus the flora is more like that found on the Swan Coastal Plain than the arid zone in which it occurs.

== Ecology ==
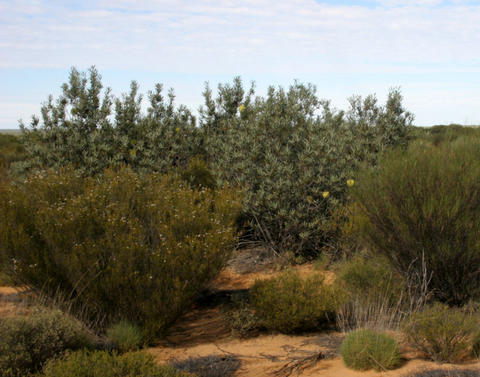
B. rosserae (rear) in its natural habitat, amongst Acacia and Triodia species

Very little is known of the ecology of B. rosserae. Its massive lignotuber is clearly an adaptation to desert conditions, providing a store of water during extended periods of drought, and a store of energy from which it can resprout after bushfire. Marriott also considers its papery bark to be an adaptation to desert conditions, although he does not elaborate on how the plant benefits from it.

Flowering apparently occurs only after rain, and hence may be separated by periods of many years. There is clearly no shortage of pollinators, as most "cones" contain plenty of follicles. Although most follicles observed are closed, a few open ones have been found, suggesting that the species is weakly serotinous: that is, a few follicles open spontaneously or in response to rain, but most remain closed until burnt.

Seedlings would have little chance of surviving in a normal dry season; establishment probably requires several consecutive seasons of good rain. The combination of a bushfire followed by several seasons of cyclonic storms probably only occurs every few hundred years, suggesting that opportunities for seedling recruitment are extremely rare. This would explain why the entire population appears to be over two hundred years old.

There is little information on threats to the species. All known plants appear to be in very good health and free of pests; it seems they are not eaten or damaged by the area's kangaroos, goats and sheep. Bushfire clearly poses no threat; and the area is free from Phytophthora cinnamomi dieback, a scourge of most other western Banksia species. Any concerns about future land use are abated by the fact that the largest population occurs on crown land, which is now being considered for a conservation reserve. In fact, the only perceived threat is the rarity of conditions conducive to seedling recruitment: "it may well be that this banksia has become so adapted to its harsh environment that its long-term future in the wild is in doubt."

Because of the absence of any specific threat to the species, it has not been declared rare or threatened. However, Olde and Marriott declared it to merit Priority One listing on the Department of Environment and Conservation's Declared Rare and Priority Flora List. Consequently, they withheld the precise location of their specimens "for conservation reasons".

== Cultivation ==
Banksia rosserae is poorly known in cultivation as yet. In 2003, Kevin Collins reported that "early trials have proven good seed viability and rapid young seedling development". The following year Neil Marriott reported that "seedlings germinate well with smoked water during spring, and young plants establishing here in deep granite sands and sandy loams at Stawell are growing slowly but steadily." It was his view that the species was likely to be of value to the cut flower industry, and as a garden plant in hot dry climates.
