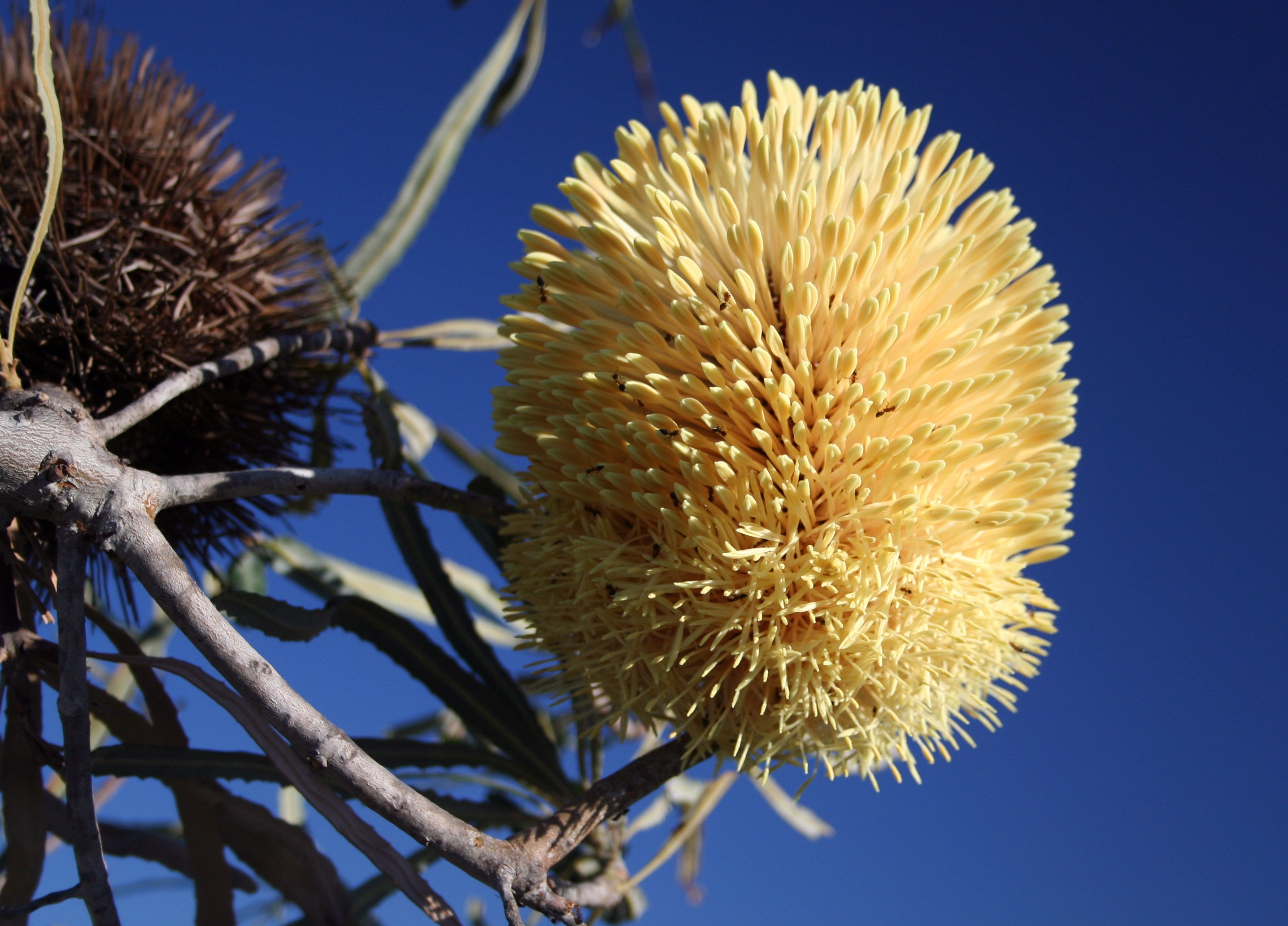

Conservation status
- Least Concern (IUCN 3.1)

Scientific classification
- Kingdom: Plantae
- Clade: Tracheophytes
- Clade: Angiosperms
- Clade: Eudicots
- Order: Proteales
- Family: Proteaceae
- Genus: Banksia
- Species: B. lindleyana

Binomial name
- Banksia lindleyana Meisn.

= Banksia lindleyana =

Porcupine banksia

Species of shrub native to Western Australia

Banksia lindleyana, commonly known as the porcupine banksia, is a species of woody shrub in the genus Banksia of the family Proteaceae. It generally grows as a small shrub to 1 m (3 ft) high with long narrow serrated leaves, and bright yellow oval or round inflorescences. Flowering occurs in late summer, after which time the flower spikes age and turn to brown and then grey, and develop up to 70 follicles. It occurs in the vicinity of Kalbarri, Western Australia. Found on sandy soils, the plant serves as a pollinator for a variety of bird and animal species.

== Description ==
Banksia lindleyana grows as a shrub up to 3 metres (9.8 ft) tall. Young branches are densely felted with hairs, but these are lost with age, and eventually replaced with a deeply fissured grey bark. The leaves are low and narrow (4 to 13 cm long but only 0.4 to 1.2 cm wide), with serrated edges and a blunt apex; like the young branches, young leaves are felted with hairs, but these are lost with age, except in small pits on the underside. The flowering season is from January to March; flowers are yellow, and occur in a characteristic Banksia flower spike. Oval to spherical in shape, this is from 5 to 9 centimetres (2–4 in) long, and occurs on a short, lateral branchlet arising from an older branch. After flowering, the styles wither but do not fall, giving the infructescence a hairy appearance. Infructescences may contain up to 70 follicles, each with two small winged seeds.

== Taxonomy ==
Commonly known as the porcupine banksia, Banksia lindleyana was first published by Carl Meissner in 1855, based on material collected by James Drummond in 1850–1851 near the lower Murchison River. Meissner did not give an etymology for the specific epithet, but it is accepted that the name honours John Lindley. Initially, Meissner's only comment on the affinities of the species was that:

In the leaves and glabrous flowers this has some resemblance to B. cylindrostachya [now B. attenuata], but otherwise it is quite distinct, as well as from every other species.

When he published his taxonomic arrangement of Banksia the following year, in B. ser Salicinae on account of its linear leaves with grey undersides, positioning it between B. cylindrostachya and B. marginata.

When George Bentham published his arrangement in 1870, he abandoned Meissner's series, which were based on leaf characters and therefore unacceptably heterogeneous. Instead he erected four sections, placing B. lindleyana in B. sect. Orthostylis (now B. ser. Banksia) because the styles, after they have been released from the perianth, are curved only at the base, and are otherwise, straight, rigid and erect. The species was positioned between B. caleyi and B. elegans.

In 1891, Otto Kuntze, in his Revisio Generum Plantarum, rejected the generic name Banksia L.f., on the grounds that the name Banksia had previously been published in 1776 as Banksia J.R.Forst & G.Forst, referring to the genus now known as Pimelea. Kuntze proposed Sirmuellera as an alternative, referring to this species as Sirmuellera lindleyana. This application of the principle of priority was largely ignored by Kuntze's contemporaries, and Banksia L.f. was formally conserved and Sirmuellera rejected in 1940.

In 1981, Alex George published "The genus Banksia L.f. (Proteaceae)", which presented the first taxonomic revision of Banksia for over a century. In George's taxonomic arrangement, B. lindleyana was placed in B. ser. Cyrtostylis, which was defined as containing those members of B. sect. Banksia with slender flowers, a small pollen-presenter, and beaked follicles. The species was placed near the middle of the series, between B. attenuata and B. ashbyi, but George also acknowledged that some characters that were not typical of the series: an unusually large pollen-presenter, and some characters similar to those of B. ser. Tetragonae.

George's arrangement stood unchallenged until 1996, when Kevin Thiele and Pauline Ladiges published their revised arrangement based on a cladistic analysis of the genus. They found George's B. ser. Cyrtostylis to be highly polyphyletic, and transferred a number of taxa into other series. B. lindleyana resolved as one of the most basal species of B. subg. Banksia, after B. elegans and a small clade consisting of B. elderiana and B. ser. Tetragonae. Accordingly, it was placed alone in a new series, B. ser. Lindleyanae, which was placed between B. ser. Tetragonae and B. ser. Banksia.

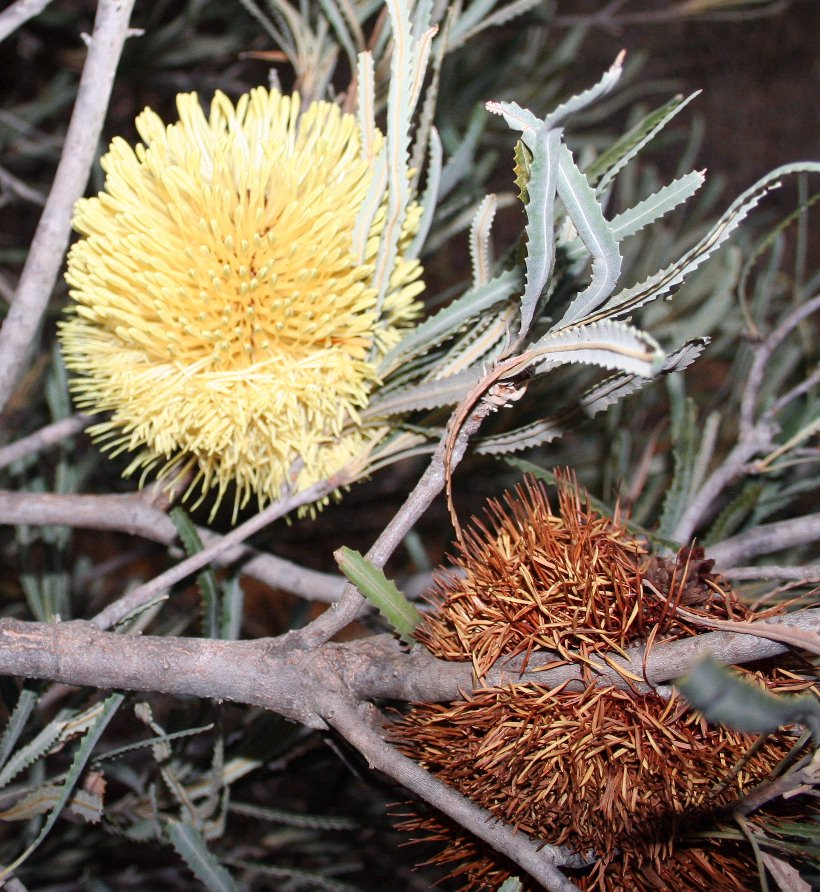
Near the Murchison River

Banksia

B. subg. Isostylis (3 species)
B. elegans (incertae sedis)
B. subg. Banksia

B. ser. Tetragonae (4 species)
B. ser. Lindleyanae

B. lindleyana

B. ser. Banksia (2 subseries, 12 species)
B. baueri (incertae sedis)
B. lullfitzii (incertae sedis)
B. attenuata (incertae sedis)
B. ashbyi (incertae sedis)
B. coccinea (incertae sedis)
B. ser. Prostratae (8 species)
B. ser. Cyrtostylis (4 species)
B. ser. Ochraceae (3 species, 2 subspecies)
B. ser. Grandes (2 species)
B. ser. Salicinae (2 series, 11 species, 4 subspecies)
B. ser. Spicigerae (3 series, 7 species, 6 varieties)
B. ser. Quercinae (2 species)
B. ser. Dryandroideae (1 species)
B. ser. Abietinae (4 subseries, 15 species, 8 varieties)

Thiele and Ladiges' arrangement remained current only until 1999, when George's treatment of the genus for the Flora of Australia series of monographs was published. George's 1999 arrangement was essentially a revision of his 1981 arrangement, which took into account some of Thiele and Ladiges' data, but rejected their overall arrangement. Despite George describing B. ser. Cyrtostylis as "a rather heterogeneous series", his 1981 circumscription was restored with minimal changes, the most significant being the relocation of B. lindleyana to the end of the series, in recognition of the species' relationship with B. ser. Tetragonae:

Banksia

B. subg. Banksia

B. sect. Banksia

B. ser. Salicinae (11 species, 7 subspecies)
B. ser. Grandes (2 species)
B. ser. Banksia (8 species)
B. ser. Crocinae (4 species)
B. ser. Prostratae (6 species, 3 varieties)
B. ser. Cyrtostylis

B. media
B. praemorsa
B. epica
B. pilostylis
B. attenuata
B. ashbyi
B. benthamiana
B. audax
B. lullfitzii
B. elderiana
B. laevigata (2 subspecies)
B. elegans
B. lindleyana

B. ser. Tetragonae (3 species)
B. ser. Bauerinae (1 species)
B. ser. Quercinae (2 species)

B. sect. Coccinea (1 species)
B. sect. Oncostylis (4 series, 22 species, 4 subspecies, 11 varieties)

B. subg. Isostylis (3 species)

Since 1998, Austin Mast has been publishing results of ongoing cladistic analyses of DNA sequence data for the subtribe Banksiinae. His analyses suggest a phylogeny that is very greatly different from George's arrangement, with B. lindleyana appearing in a clade with B. menziesii, B. ashbyi and B. sceptrum. A 2013 molecular study by Marcel Cardillo and colleagues using chloroplast DNA and combining it with earlier results reaffirmed B. lindleyana as an offshoot of a lineage that gave rise to B. ashbyi and B. sceptrum.

Early in 2007, Mast and Thiele initiated a rearrangement of Banksia by merging Dryandra into it, and publishing B. subg. Spathulatae for the taxa having spoon-shaped cotyledons; in this way they also redefined the autonym B. subg. Banksia. They foreshadowed publishing a full arrangement once DNA sampling of Dryandra was complete; in the meantime, if Mast and Thiele's nomenclatural changes are taken as an interim arrangement, then B. lindleyana is placed in B. subg. Banksia.

Among the Dryandra species transferred into Banksia by Mast and Thiele was Dryandra lindleyana; as the specific epithet "lindlayana" was already taken, D. lindleyana was given the name Banksia dallanneyi, the new specific epithet being an anagram of "lindleyana".

== Distribution and habitat ==
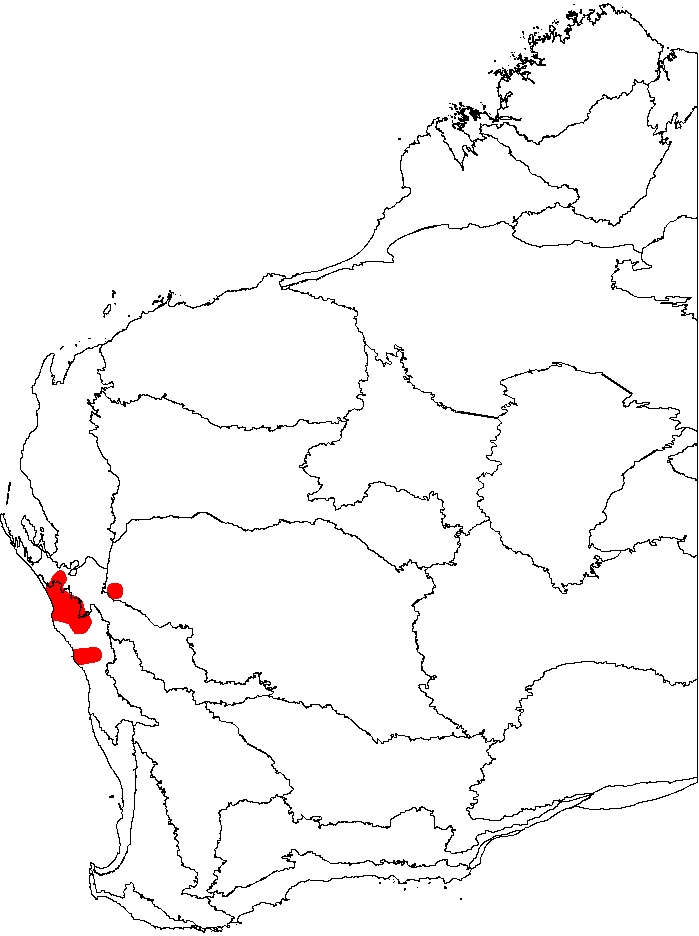
B. lindleyana mainly occurs in northern parts of the Geraldton Sandplains, but there is also a population well inland.

B. lindleyana mostly occurs on the Geraldton Sandplains north of Geraldton toward Shark Bay, but there is also a collection from well inland, on the western edge of the Murchison region. It grows in shrubland on deep yellow sand, in the swales of coastal dunes and inland on flat sandplain.

== Cultivation ==
Banksia lindleyana has horticultural appeal in its attractive flowers and flower buds, and its woody fruiting cones may be carved. It fares best in a sunny location in deep calcareous sand, and grows well in Perth soils, although not so well in cooler climates. It is a slow growing plant, and flowers in 6–8 years from seed. Seeds do not require any treatment, and take 23 to 39 days to germinate.
