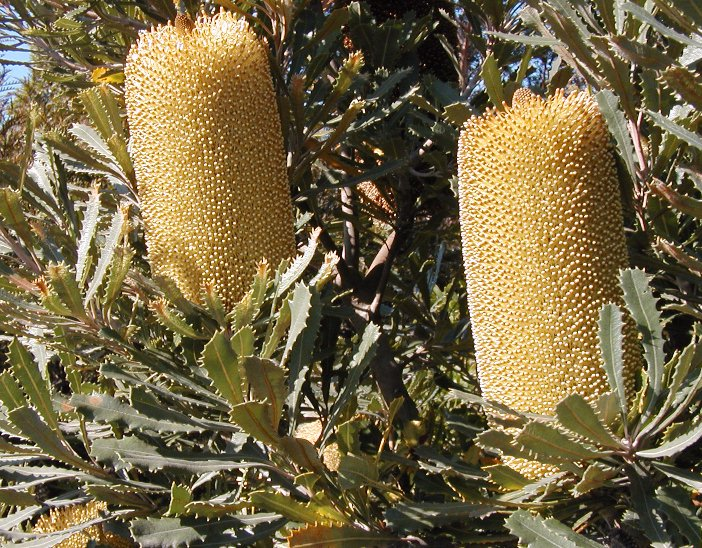
- B. media (southern plains banksia), the type species of B. ser. Cyrtostylis

Scientific classification
- Kingdom: Plantae
- Clade: Embryophytes
- Clade: Tracheophytes
- Clade: Spermatophytes
- Clade: Angiosperms
- Clade: Eudicots
- Order: Proteales
- Family: Proteaceae
- Genus: Banksia
- Subgenus: Banksia subg. Banksia
- Section: Banksia sect. Banksia
- Series: Banksia ser. Cyrtostylis (Benth.) A.S.George

Species
- See text

= Banksia ser. Cyrtostylis =

Taxonomic series of Australian plants

Banksia ser. Cyrtostylis is a taxonomic series within the plant genus Banksia. First published at sectional rank by George Bentham in 1870, it was demoted to a series by Alex George in 1981. The name has had three circumscriptions.

== According to Bentham ==
Bentham published B. sect. Cyrtostylis in Flora Australiensis, as part of his taxonomic arrangement of Banksia, defining it as those taxa with:

Leaves flat or undulate, the margins not revolute, toothed pinnatifid or pinnate. Style arched or nearly straight and turned upwards or curved, but not hooked after flowering, the stigmatic end small, not furrowed.

This definition essentially defined Cyrtostylis as a section for those species that did not possess the characters of the other sections; thus it was highly heterogeneous.

George Bentham's placement and circumscription of B. sect. Cyrtostylis may be summarised as follows:

Banksia

B. sect. Oncostylis (13 species, 2 varieties)
B. sect. Cyrtostylis

B. attenuata
B. media
B. Solandri
B. Goodii
B. petiolaris
B. repens
B. prostrata (now B. gardneri)
B. grandis
B. quercifolia

B. quercifolia var. integrifolia (now B. oreophila)

B. Baueri

B. sect. Eubanksia (3 species)
B. sect. Orthostylis (19 species)
B. sect. Isostylis (1 species, 1 variety)

Bentham's circumscription of Cyrtostylis remained current for over 100 years, only being superseded in 1981 by George's revision.

== According to George 1981 ==
In 1981, George published a taxonomic revision of Banksia in The genus Banksia L.f. (Proteaceae). He demoted Cyrtostylis to series rank, placing it within Banksia subgenus Banksia, section Banksia. It has remained at this rank since then, so its current name is Banksia ser. Cyrtostylis (Benth.) A.S.George.

George defined Cyrtostylis as those members of B. sect. Banksia with slender flowers, a small pollen-presenter, and beaked follicles. Its type species was given as B. media (southern plains banksia).

George's 1981 placement and circumscription of B. ser. Cyrtostylis may be summarised as follows:

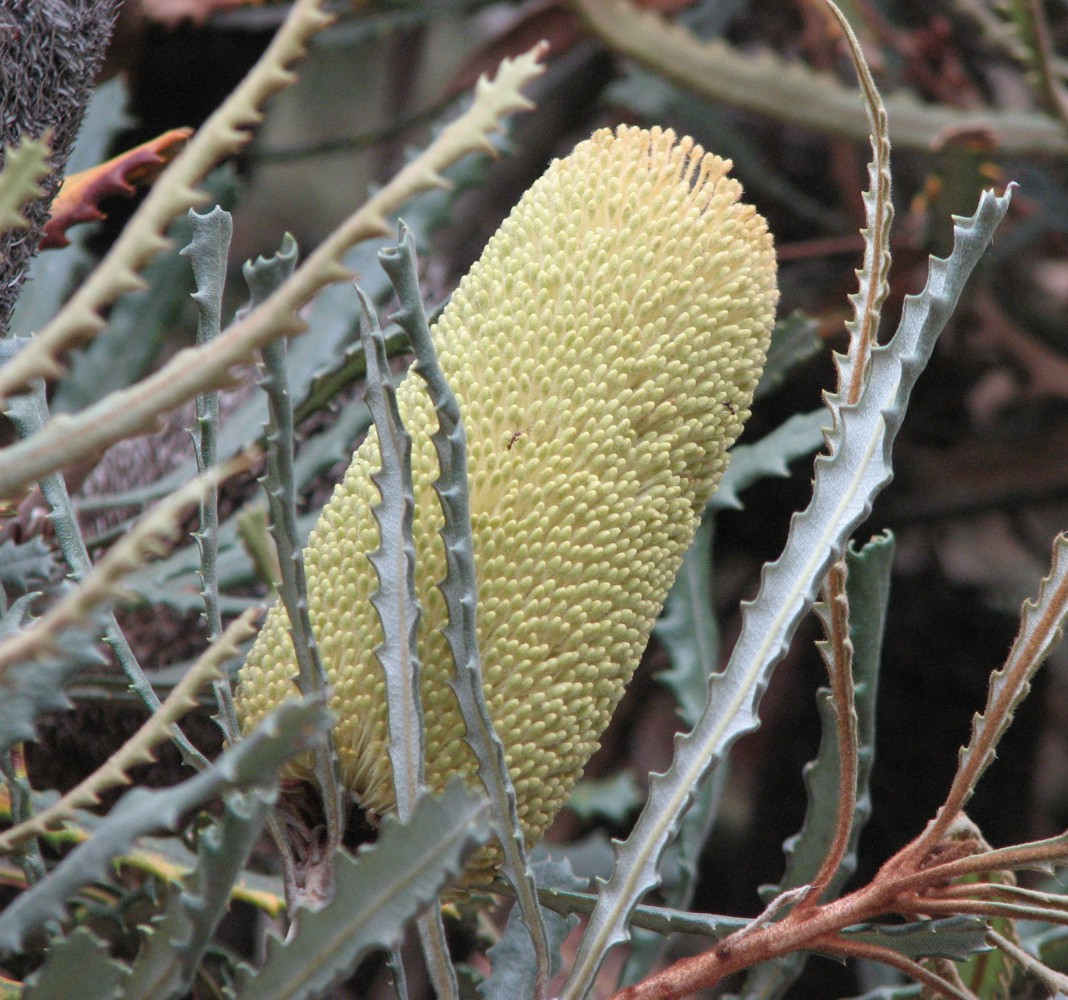
B. pilostylis (marsh banksia)

Banksia

B. subg. Banksia

B. sect. Banksia

B. ser. Salicinae (9 species, 5 subspecies)
B. ser. Grandes (2 species)
B. ser. Quercinae (3 species)
B. ser. Orthostylis (8 species, now B. ser. Banksia)
B. ser. Crocinae (4 species)
B. ser. Cyrtostylis

B. media
B. praemorsa
B. pilostylis
B. attenuata
B. lindleyana
B. ashbyi
B. benthamiana
B. audax
B. laevigata

B. laevigata subsp. laevigata
B. laevigata subsp. fuscolutea

B. lullfitzii
B. elderana (now spelled B. elderiana)
B. elegans

B. ser. Prostratae (6 species, 3 varieties)
B. ser. Tetragonae (3 species)
B. ser. Coccineae (1 species)

B. sect. Oncostylis (3 series, 21 species, 4 subspecies, 10 varieties)

B. subg. Isostylis (2 species)

A significant addition to the series occurred in 1988, when George published a new species, B. epica, placing it between B. praemorsa (Cut-leaf Banksia) and B. media.

== According to Thiele and Ladiges ==
In 1996, Kevin Thiele and Pauline Ladiges undertook a cladistic analysis of morphological characters of Banksia, which yielded a phylogeny somewhat at odds with George's taxonomic arrangement. They found B. ser. Cyrtostylis to be "widely polyphyletic". Six of the fourteen taxa in George's B. ser. Cyrtostylis occurred singly in locations throughout the cladogram; these were transferred to other series or left incertae sedis. The remaining eight taxa formed a clade, which further resolved into two subclades:

- - B. pilostylis
  - - B. media
    - B. epica
    - B. praemorsa
- - B. benthamiana
  - B. audax
  - - B. laevigata subsp. laevigata
    - B. laevigata subsp. fuscolutea

Thiele and Ladiges preferred to give series rank to the subclades, rather than the entire clade, so they transferred the taxa of the second clade into B. ser. Ochraceae, retaining only the taxa of the first clade in B. ser. Cyrtostylis. No formal definition was given for the new circumscription, although Thiele and Ladiges attached no fewer than seven synapomorphies to the clade, three of which were reversals, the other four parallelisms.

The placement and circumscription of B. ser. Cyrtostylis in Thiele and Ladiges' arrangement of Banksia may be summarised as follows:

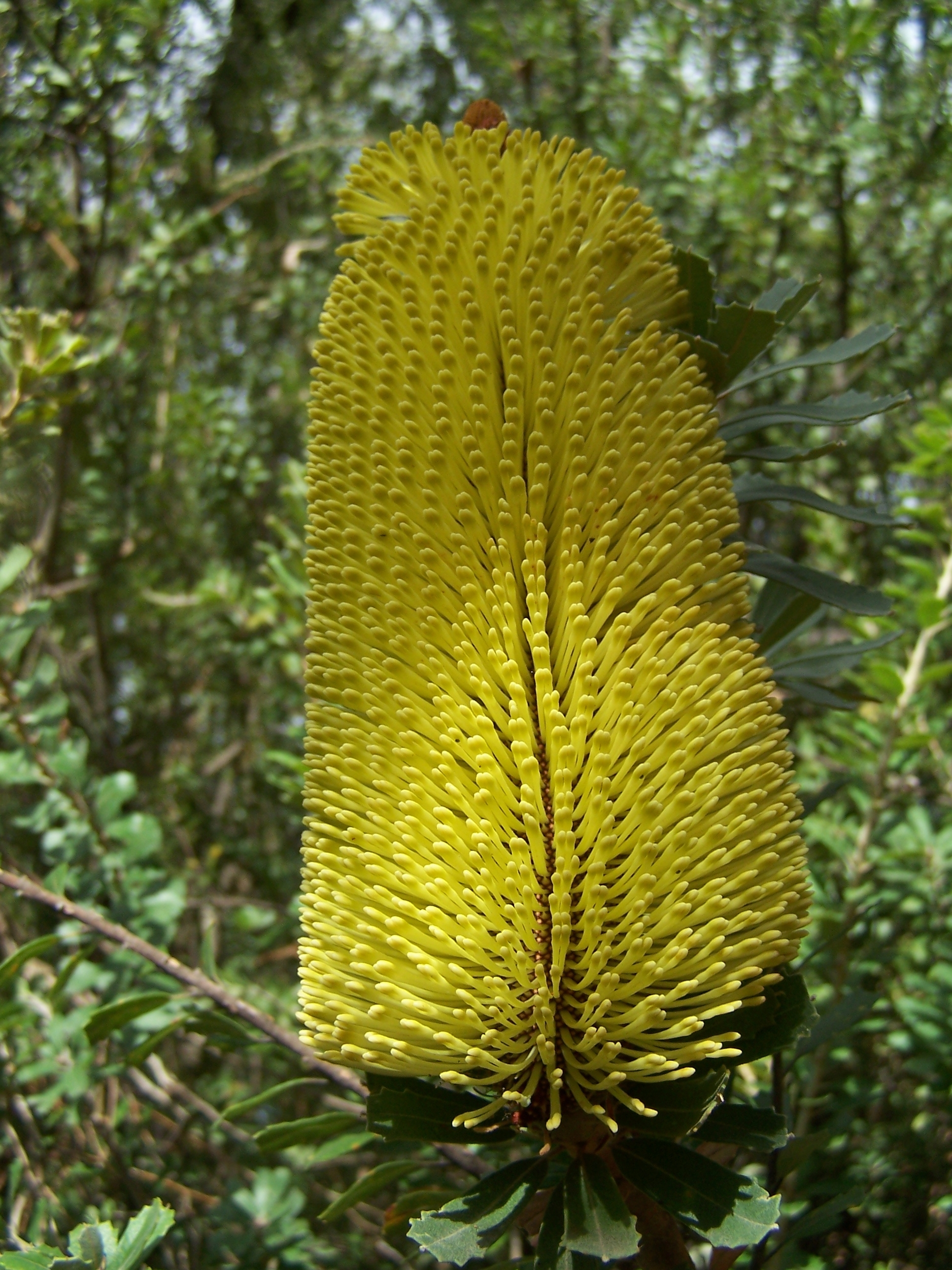
B. praemorsa (cut-leaf banksia)

Banksia

B. subg. Isostylis (3 species)
B. elegans (incertae sedis)
B. subg. Banksia

B. ser. Tetragonae (4 species)
B. ser. Lindleyanae (1 species)
B. ser. Banksia (2 subseries, 12 species)
B. baueri (incertae sedis)
B. lullfitzii (incertae sedis)
B. attenuata (incertae sedis)
B. ashbyi (incertae sedis)
B. coccinea (incertae sedis)
B. ser. Prostratae (8 species)
B. ser. Cyrtostylis

B. pilostylis
B. media
B. epica
B. praemorsa

B. ser. Ochraceae (3 species, 2 subspecies)
B. ser. Grandes (2 species)
B. ser. Salicinae (2 series, 11 species, 4 subspecies)
B. ser. Spicigerae (3 series, 7 species, 6 varieties)
B. ser. Quercinae (2 species)
B. ser. Dryandroideae (1 species)
B. ser. Abietinae (4 subseries, 15 species, 8 varieties)

== According to George 1999 ==
Thiele and Ladiges' arrangement remained current only until 1999, when it was overturned by George. George's 1999 arrangement was largely a reversion to his 1981 arrangement. Despite George describing B. ser. Cyrtostylis as "a rather heterogeneous series", its 1981 circumscription was maintained, the only changes being the inclusion of B. epica, the relocation of B. lindleyana to the end of the series, and the relocation of B. laevigata to sit between B. elderiana (swordfish banksia) and B. elegans (elegant banksia). George's 1999 placement and circumscription of B. ser. Cyrtostylis may be summarised as follows:

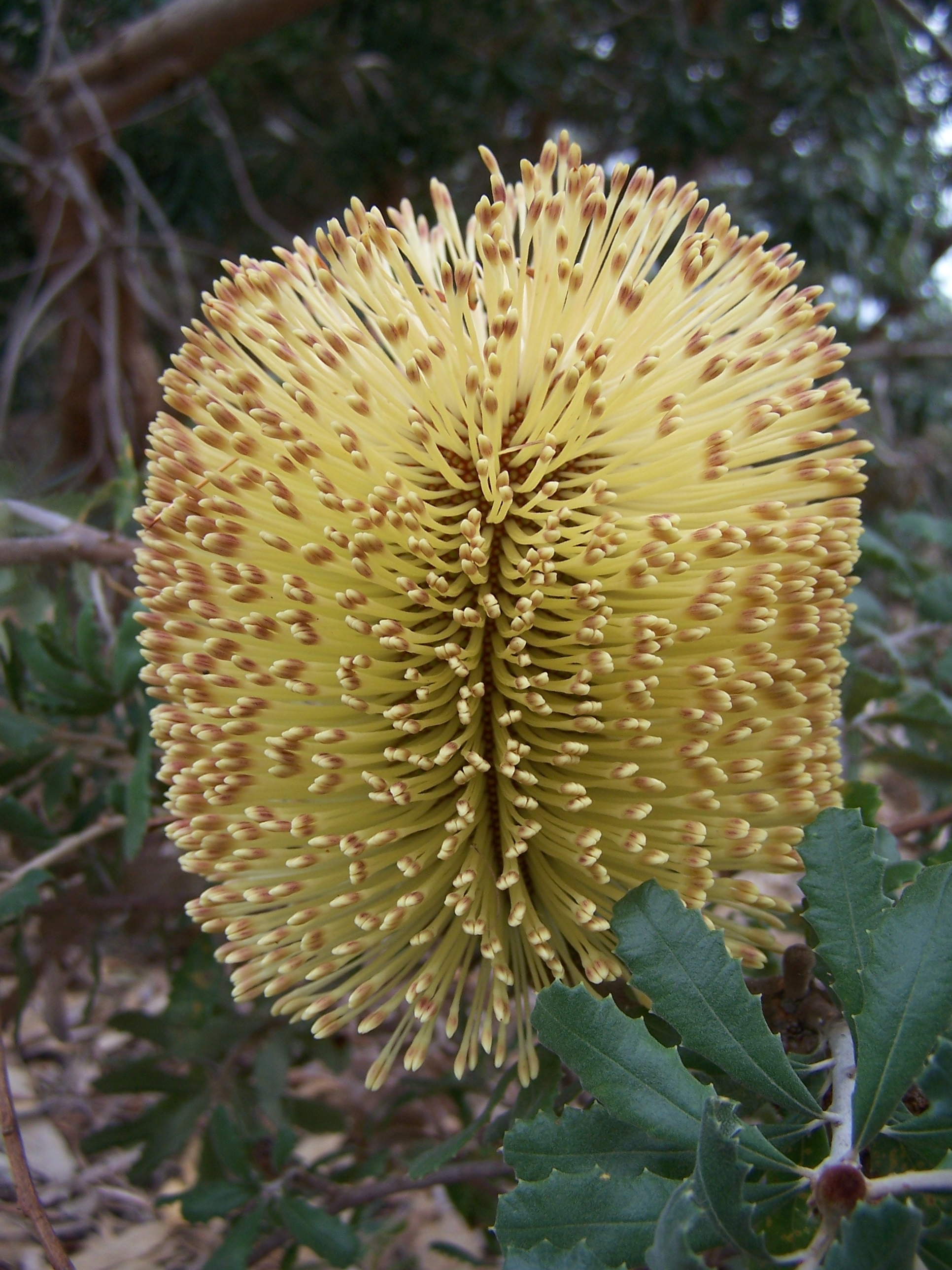
B. epica

Banksia

B. subg. Banksia

B. sect. Banksia

B. ser. Salicinae (11 species, 7 subspecies)
B. ser. Grandes (2 species)
B. ser. Banksia (8 species)
B. ser. Crocinae (4 species)
B. ser. Prostratae (6 species, 3 varieties)
B. ser. Cyrtostylis

B. media
B. praemorsa
B. epica
B. pilostylis
B. attenuata
B. ashbyi
B. benthamiana
B. audax
B. lullfitzii
B. elderiana
B. laevigata

B. laevigata subsp. laevigata
B. laevigata subsp. fuscolutea

B. elegans
B. lindleyana

B. ser. Tetragonae (3 species)
B. ser. Bauerinae (1 species)
B. ser. Quercinae (2 species)

B. sect. Coccinea (1 species)
B. sect. Oncostylis (4 series, 22 species, 4 subspecies, 11 varieties)

B. subg. Isostylis (3 species)

In 2002 B. rosserae was published; it was tentatively placed in B. ser. Cyrtostylis between B. elderiana and B. laevigata.

== Recent developments ==
Since 1998, Austin Mast has been publishing results of ongoing cladistic analyses of DNA sequence data for the subtribe Banksiinae. His analyses suggest a phylogeny that is rather different to previous taxonomic arrangements. With respect to B. ser. Cyrtostylis, Mast's results accord closely with the arrangement of Thiele and Ladiges, inferring a polytomous clade corresponding exactly with Thiele and Ladiges' series. This clade is however, not particularly close to the clade that corresponds to B. ser. Ochraceae.

Early in 2007 Mast and Thiele initiated a rearrangement of Banksia by transferring Dryandra into it, and publishing B. subg. Spathulatae for the species having spoon-shaped cotyledons; in this way they also redefined the autonym B. subg. Banksia. All members of B. ser. Cyrtostylis fall within Mast and Thiele's B. subg. Banksia, but nothing further has been published. Mast and Thiele have foreshadowed publishing a full arrangement once DNA sampling of Dryandra is complete.
