= Marsh banksia =

Marsh banksia is a common name for several plants and may refer to:

- Banksia pilostylis, endemic to Western Australia
- Banksia telmatiaea, native to Western Australia
