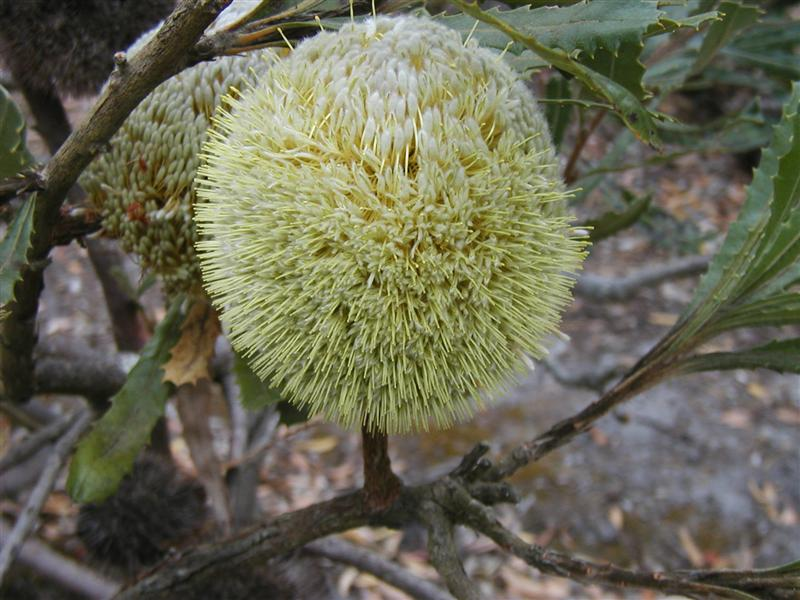
- B. laevigata subsp. laevigata, cult. Banksia Farm

Scientific classification
- Kingdom: Plantae
- Clade: Tracheophytes
- Clade: Angiosperms
- Clade: Eudicots
- Order: Proteales
- Family: Proteaceae
- Genus: Banksia
- Species: B. laevigata Meisn.
- Subspecies: B. l. subsp. laevigata

Trinomial name
- Banksia laevigata subsp. laevigata

= Banksia laevigata subsp. laevigata =

Tennis ball banksia

Subspecies of shrub from Western Australia

Banksia laevigata subsp. laevigata, the tennis ball banksia, is a subspecies of small woody shrub in the plant genus Banksia. It occurs in Western Australia's semi-arid shrubland. It and the closely related B. laevigata subsp. fuscolutea (golden ball banksia) are the two subspecies of the species Banksia laevigata.

== Taxonomy ==
The species B. laevigata was first described by Swiss botanist Carl Meissner in 1856, after being originally collected by James Drummond in 1848. No separate subspecies were recognised until Alex George collected specimens of subspecies fuscolutea east of Hyden in 1964, and formally named it two years later. The naming of a new subspecies automatically created the autonym (botany) subspecies laevigata.

The common name is derived from the resemblance of its inflorescences to tennis balls.

George described its nearest probable relative as Banksia audax and placed it in the series Cyrtostylis, which he concedes is rather heterogeneous. The series was split into three in the 1996 morphological cladistic analysis by botanists Kevin Thiele and Pauline Ladiges, with B. laevigata placed in the new series Ochraceae with B. audax and B. benthamiana in their arrangement. This was reinforced in American botanist Austin Mast's 2002 analysis, as B. laevigata came out as sister to three groups; the first the pair comprising B. audax and B. benthamiana.

Early in 2007, Mast and Thiele rearranged the genus Banksia by merging Dryandra into it, and published B. subg. Spathulatae for the taxa having spoon-shaped cotyledons; thus B. subg. Banksia was redefined as encompassing taxa lacking spoon-shaped cotyledons. They foreshadowed publishing a full arrangement once DNA sampling of Dryandra was complete; in the meantime, if Mast and Thiele's nomenclatural changes are taken as an interim arrangement, then B. laevigata subsp. laevigata is placed in B. subg. Banksia.

== Description ==
The tennis ball banksia is a shrub to 3.5 metres (11.5 ft) high with grey, flaky bark. New growth occurs in summer, and the young stems and leaves are covered in fine hairs, which fall away with age. There are two variants distinguished by their leaf margins, one along the Fitzgerald River with rather obtuse leaf teeth, the other in the Ravensthorpe Ranges with larger, acute teeth similar to those of subsp. fuscolutea. The former is represented by the type. The inflorescences occur in spring and are oval in shape and a greenish yellow in colour. Flowers appear from October to December.

== Distribution and habitat ==
Banksia laevigata subsp. laevigata grows in shrubland on stony soils of spongolite or laterite, along the lower Fitzgerald River and in the Ravensthorpe Ranges in inland southern Western Australia.

Banksia laevigata subsp. laevigata is classified as Priority Four - Rare on the Declared Rare and Priority Flora List under the Wildlife Conservation Act of Western Australia. That is, it is a taxon which has been adequately surveyed and which, while being rare (in Australia), are not currently threatened by any identifiable factors. It requires monitoring every 5–10 years.

== Ecology ==
Like other banksias, the tennis ball banksia is likely to play host to a variety of pollinators. Ants, bees and wasps have been recorded thus far.

== Cultivation ==
Although like many western banksias it is sensitive to Phytophthora cinnamomi dieback, it has been successfully grown on Australia's east coast. It has also been successfully grafted onto Banksia integrifolia.
