= Celia Rosser =

Australian artist (born 1930)

Celia Rosser OAM
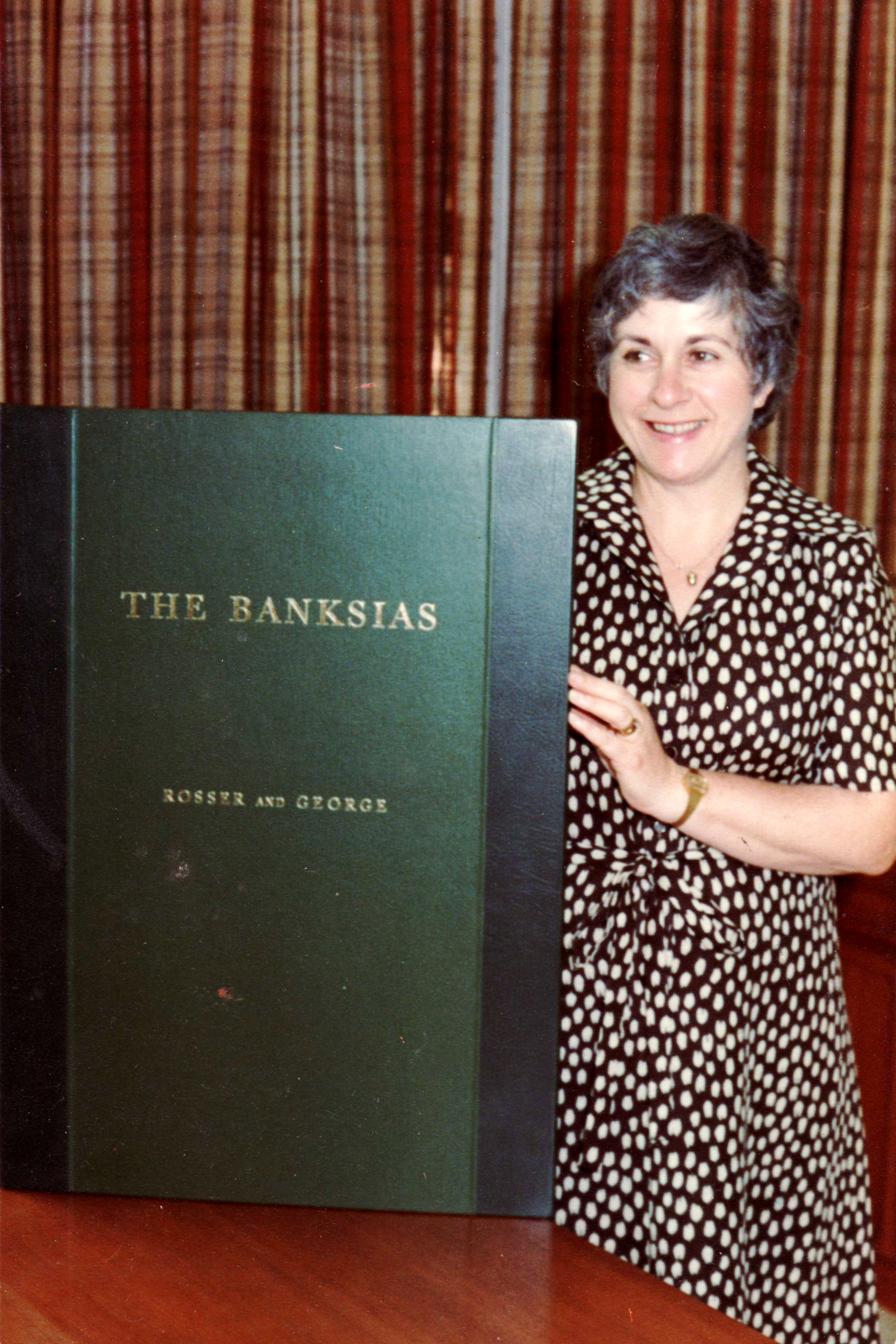
- Born: 1930 (age 95–96); Melbourne, Australia
- Known for: Botanical Illustration
- Awards: Medal of the Order of Australia (1995)

Celia Elizabeth Rosser OAM (born 1930) is an Australian botanical illustrator, best known for having published The Banksias, a three-volume series of monographs containing watercolour paintings of every Banksia species.

Born Celia Elizabeth Prince, she began painting Australian wildflowers early in her artistic career. She first began painting Banksias after seeing a Banksia serrata near her home in Orbost, Victoria. Her first exhibition was at Leveson Gallery in Melbourne in 1965, and included three watercolours of Banksia species. Two years later she published Wildflowers of Victoria.

In 1970, Rosser was appointed Science Faculty Artist at Monash University. She illustrated Peter Bridgewater's The Saltmarsh Plants of Southern Australia and The Mosses of Southern Australia by George Scott and Ilma Grace Stone. In 1974 she was appointed University Botanical Artist, and began the project of painting every Banksia species. The project took over 25 years to complete, and resulted in the publication of a three volume monograph entitled The Banksias, with accompanying text by Alex George. Publication of the final volume in 2000 represented the first time that such a large genus has been entirely painted.

In 1997 she was awarded the Linnaean Society of London's Jill Smythies Award for botanical illustration, and in 1995 was awarded a Medal of the Order of Australia. Monash University awarded her an honorary Master of Science degree in 1981, and an honorary PhD in 1999.

== Legacy ==
In March 1978 a chance seeding of Banksia canei with deeply lobed leaves and a prostrate habit was registered as a cultivar by Alf Salkin under the names Banksia 'Celia Rosser' and Banksia canei 'Celia Rosser'.

In 2001, Peter Olde and Neil Marriott published a description of a new Banksia species from the arid shrubland of Western Australia, naming it Banksia rosserae in Rosser's honour.

Since 2002, the Friends of the Royal Botanic Gardens Melbourne have awarded the "Celia Rosser Medal for Botanical Art" to exhibitors whose works show "excellence in one or more aspects of the art form including the highest degree of scientific accuracy" at their "The Art of Botanical Illustration" exhibition.

== See also ==
- List of Australian botanical illustrators
