= The Banksias =

Three-volume series of monographs by Celia Rosser

The Banksias, by Celia Rosser, is a three-volume series of monographs containing paintings of every Banksia species. Its publication represented the first time such a large genus had been entirely painted by a single botanical artist. It has been described as "one of the outstanding botanical works of this century."

The paintings themselves are watercolours on Arches rag paper. The three volumes comprise plates reproduced using offset printing, and bound in green leather. Alex George wrote the accompanying text.

Rosser began working on the series in 1974. Volume I of The Banksias, containing 24 plates, was published in 1981. The edition comprised 730 books and 100 portfolios. Volume II, published in 1988, also contained 24 plates and was also released in an edition of 730 books and 100 portfolios. Volume III, completed in 2000, contained 28 plates, and was released in an edition of 530 books and 300 portfolios. Since the publication of Volume III, a new Banksia, B. rosserae has been described; Rosser subsequently painted it and released a set of prints. In 2007, the genus Dryandra was transferred to Banksia, so there are now a great many Banksia species that have not been painted by Rosser.

Each volume of The Banksias has been presented to the Queen by the Australian Government as a gift of the Australian people. Largely on the basis of her work for The Banksias, Rosser was awarded a Medal of the Order of Australia 1995 for her contribution to botanical art, and the Jill Smythies Award for botanical art in 1997.
