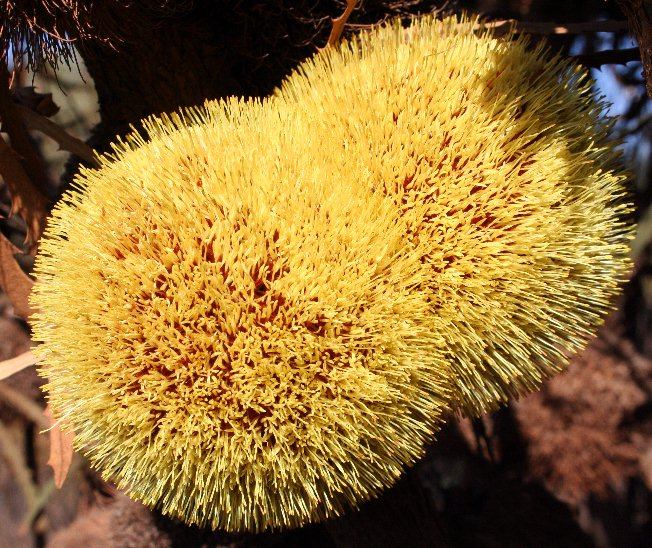

Scientific classification
- Kingdom: Plantae
- Clade: Tracheophytes
- Clade: Angiosperms
- Clade: Eudicots
- Order: Proteales
- Family: Proteaceae
- Genus: Banksia
- Species: B. laevigata
- Subspecies: B. l. subsp. fuscolutea

Trinomial name
- Banksia laevigata subsp. fuscolutea A.S.George

= Banksia laevigata subsp. fuscolutea =

Subspecies of plant native to Australia

Banksia laevigata subsp. fuscolutea is a subspecies of Banksia laevigata. It is native to the Southwest Botanical Province of Western Australia.
