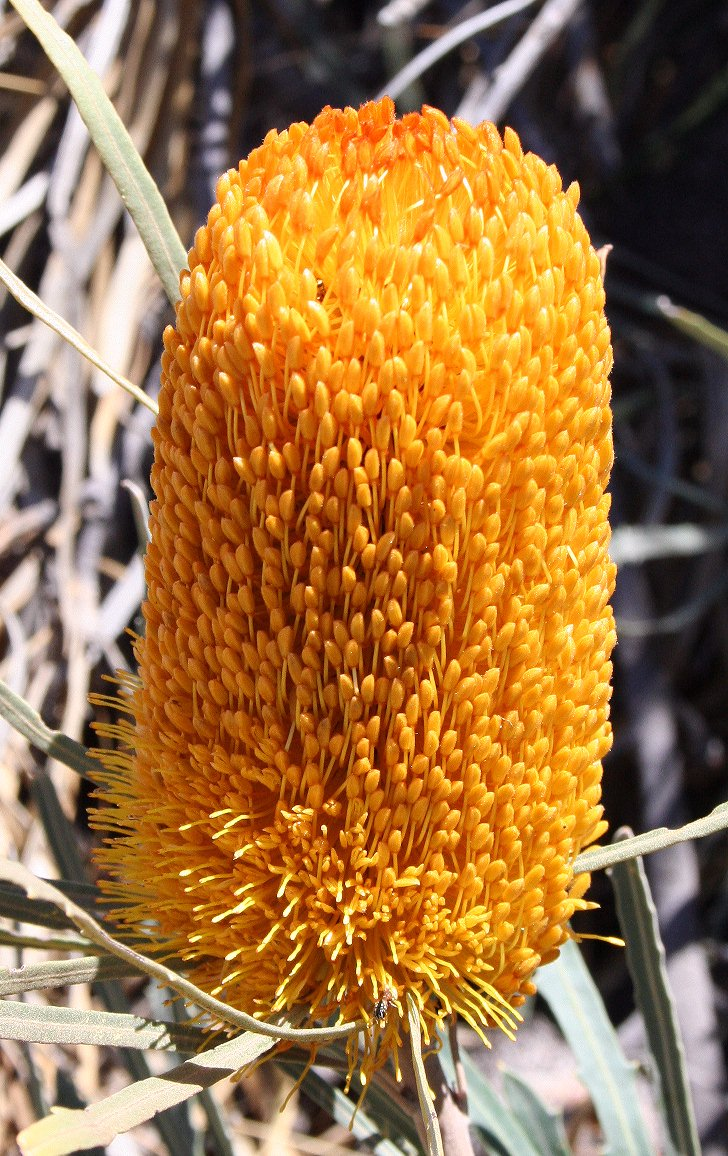
- Banksia benthamiana near Pithara

Conservation status
- Priority Four — Rare Taxa (DEC)

Scientific classification
- Kingdom: Plantae
- Clade: Tracheophytes
- Clade: Angiosperms
- Clade: Eudicots
- Order: Proteales
- Family: Proteaceae
- Genus: Banksia
- Species: B. benthamiana

Binomial name
- Banksia benthamiana C.A.Gardner

= Banksia benthamiana =

Species of shrub endemic to Western Australia

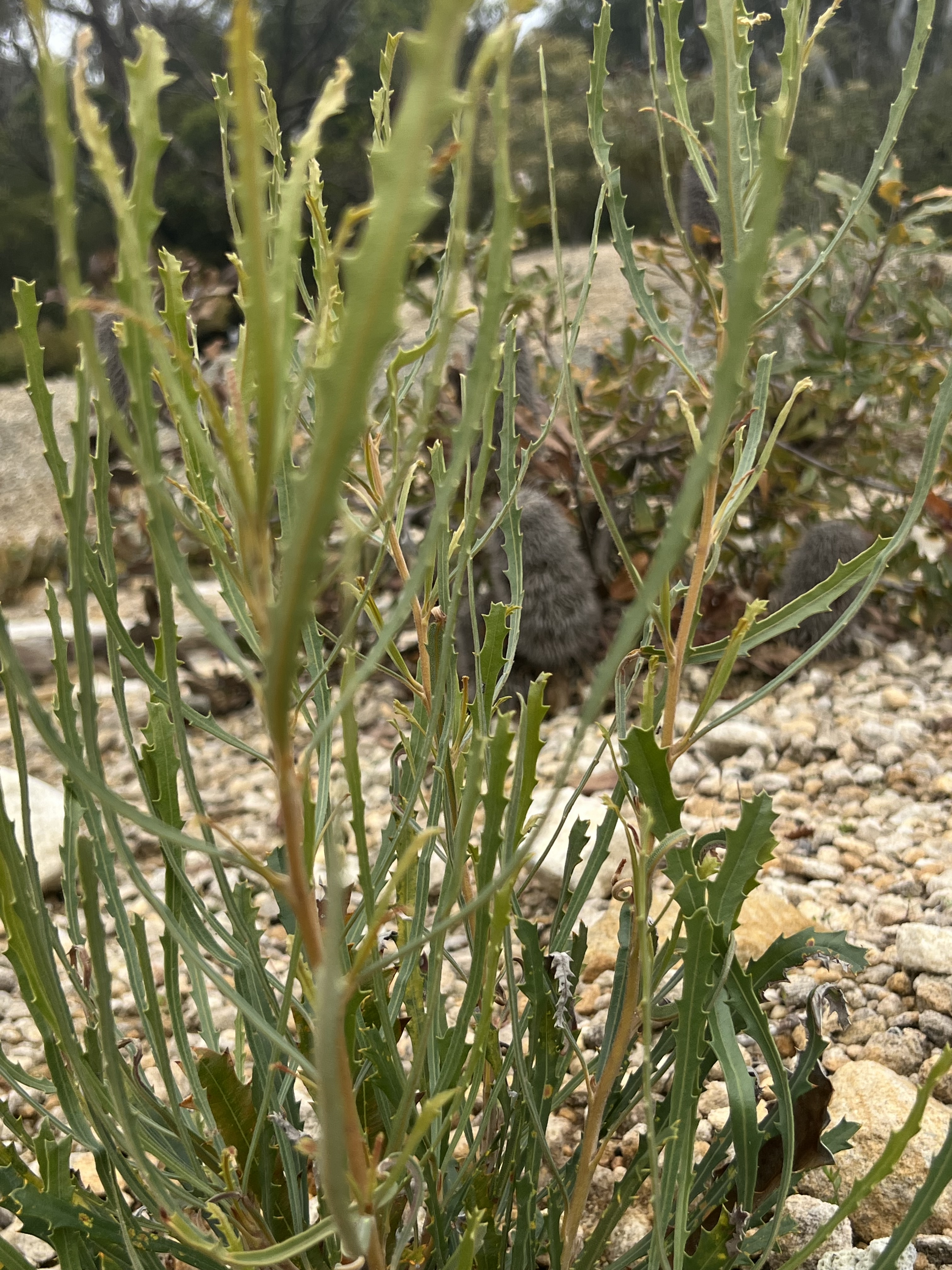
Foliage

Banksia benthamiana is a species of shrub that is endemic to the Southwest of Western Australia. It has hairy, linear leaves, usually with scattered small teeth along the edges, and spikes of orange flowers.

== Description ==
Banksia benthamiana is a shrub that typically grows to a height of 2–4 m (6 ft 7 in – 13 ft 1 in) but does not form a lignotuber. Its bark is roughly flaking and grey and the branchlets are densely covered with rust-coloured hairs. The leaves are linear in shape, mostly 100–250 mm (3.9–9.8 in) long and 5–10 mm (0.20–0.39 in) wide on a petiole 5–15 mm (0.20–0.59 in) long. The sides of the leaves usually have small teeth 1–2 mm (0.039–0.079 in) long and 5–20 mm (0.20–0.79 in) apart along one half or more. Both surfaces of the leaves are hairy when young. The flowering spike is borne on a short side branch and is 50–100 mm (2.0–3.9 in) long and about 60 mm (2.4 in) wide when the flowers open. Each flower has a hairy perianth 20–24 mm (0.79–0.94 in) long and a glabrous, curved pistil 23–26 mm (0.91–1.02 in) long. Flowering occurs from late November to January and up to 130 narrow elliptical, smooth, furry follicles 10–15 mm (0.39–0.59 in) long, 3–5 mm (0.12–0.20 in) high and wide, develop in each spike.

== Taxonomy ==
Banksia benthamiana was first formally described in 1964 by Charles Gardner in the Journal of the Royal Society of Western Australia. The original type specimens were collected in January 1940 near Dalwallinu. The specific epithet honours George Bentham (1800–1884), author of Flora Australiensis.

This banksia has been traditionally considered to be closely related to B. ashbyi, a larger shrub with larger, more deeply lobed leaves, bright orange flowers and wider, more rounded follicles. It is probably related also to B. audax, a much smaller species with pubescent-hirsute perianth. Using morphological cladistics, Kevin Thiele placed it in a group with B. audax and B. laevigata, based on very small distinctive seedling leaves, and linear pollen presenters. This grouping was supported in Mast and Givnish's 2002 molecular study. The position of Banksia ashbyi was unclear in this latter study but it did not appear to be closely related.

== Distribution and habitat ==
This banksia is found in scattered populations between Mullewa and Kulja in the Southwest of Western Australia. It grows on plains in shrubland, sometimes as an emergent plant, on brownish yellow sandy loam or clay-loam, sometimes over laterite. Many of the populations are small and on road verges. The annual rainfall in these areas is around 300 mm (12 in).

== Conservation status ==
Banksia benthamiana is currently classified as "Priority Four" by the Government of Western Australia Department of Parks and Wildlife, meaning that is rare or near threatened.

== Ecology ==
Volunteers for the 1985 Banksia Atlas reported that moths and birds have been seen pollinating it.

== Use in horticulture ==
Banksia benthamiana is almost unknown in cultivation and unsuitable for small gardens, but can be grown in a container and is fast growing. A slightly acid deep sand or gravel soil is desirable. Seeds do not require any treatment, and take 19 to 42 days to germinate.
