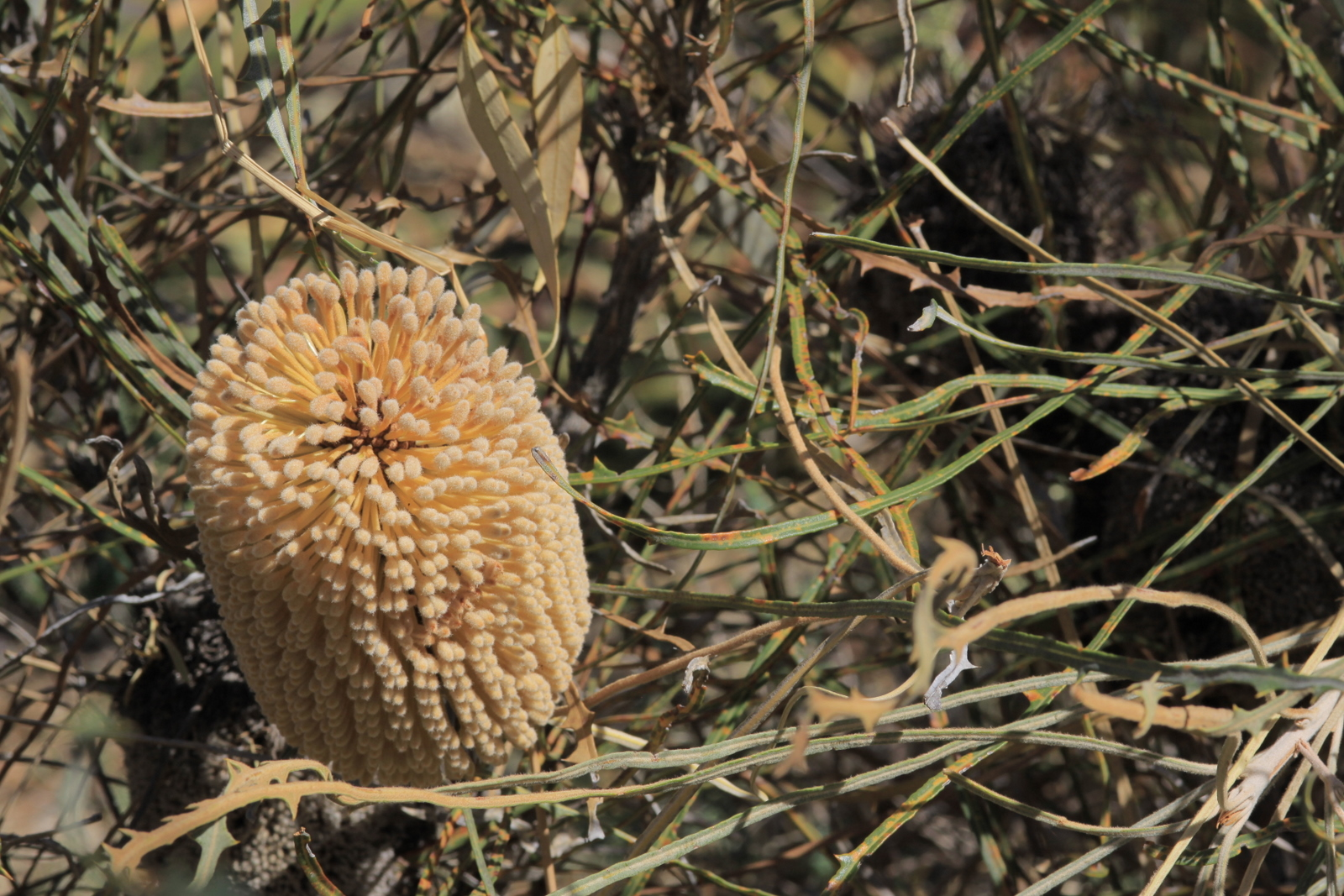
- Banksia lullfitzii at Hollywood Reserve, Perth

Conservation status
- Priority Three — Poorly Known Taxa (DEC)

Scientific classification
- Kingdom: Plantae
- Clade: Tracheophytes
- Clade: Angiosperms
- Clade: Eudicots
- Order: Proteales
- Family: Proteaceae
- Genus: Banksia
- Species: B. lullfitzii

Binomial name
- Banksia lullfitzii C.A.Gardner

= Banksia lullfitzii =

Species of shrub endemic to Western Australia

Banksia lullfitzii is a species of shrub that is endemic to the south-west of Western Australia. It has linear leaves with widely-spaced, sharply-pointed teeth on the sides, golden-orange to orange-brown flowers, and later, up to thirty follicles in each head.

== Description ==
Banksia lullfitzii is a much-branched, often sprawling shrub that typically grows to a height of 0.8–2 m (2 ft 7 in – 6 ft 7 in) and forms a lignotuber. It has linear leaves 200–450 mm (7.9–17.7 in) long and 8–18 mm (0.31–0.71 in) wide on a petiole 10–30 mm (0.39–1.18 in) long with widely-shaped, sharply-pointed teeth on the sides. The flowers are arranged in an oval to cylindrical head 40–130 mm (1.6–5.1 in) long and 80–100 mm (3.1–3.9 in) wide when the flowers open. The flowers are golden-orange to orange-brown with the perianth 34–49 mm (1.3–1.9 in) long and a curved pistil 33–48 mm (1.3–1.9 in) long. Flowering occurs from March to May and up to thirty follicles develop in each head but partly hidden by the remains of the flowers. The follicles are elliptical, 15–25 mm (0.59–0.98 in) long, 8–12 mm (0.31–0.47 in) high and 8–10 mm (0.31–0.39 in) wide.

== Taxonomy and naming ==
First described by Charles Gardner in 1966, B. lullfitzii was named in honour of nurseryman Fred Lullfitz. The description was published in The Western Australian Naturalist from a specimen collected by Gardner near Southern Cross.

In his 1981 paper, The genus Banksia L.f. (Proteaceae), Alex George placed B. lullfitzii in the series Cyrtostylis but a cladistic analysis of Banksia by Kevin Thiele and Pauline Ladiges published in 1996 found Banksia ser. Cyrtostylis to be "widely polyphyletic", and suggested that B. lullfitzii should be divided into three series. However, this was not accepted by Alex George who confirmed its placement in series Cyrtostylis in the Flora of Australia published in 1999.

== Distribution and habitat ==
Banksia lullfitzii is known from a small number of scattered populations that occur north of Esperance as far as Koolyanobbing. These occur on deep yellow sands in heath or mallee-heath. Although not many populations are known, the species is not considered under threat, as the area has poor access and is very poorly surveyed, making it likely that the species is under-recorded. Also, a significant proportion of known populations occur in nature reserves such as the Boorabbin National Park, and the area's low rainfall makes it unlikely that the unprotected land will be cleared for agriculture.

== Conservation status ==
This banksia is classified as "Priority Three" by the Government of Western Australia Department of Parks and Wildlife meaning that it is poorly known and known from only a few locations but is not under imminent threat.

== Use in horticulture ==
Seeds do not require any treatment, and take around 26 days to germinate.
