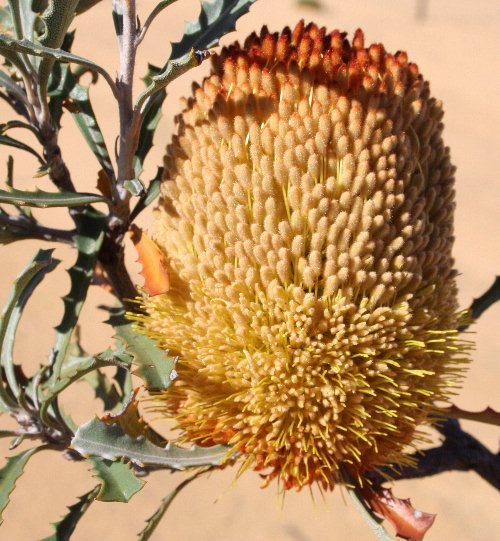
- Banksia audax east of Yellowdine

Scientific classification
- Kingdom: Plantae
- Clade: Tracheophytes
- Clade: Angiosperms
- Clade: Eudicots
- Order: Proteales
- Family: Proteaceae
- Genus: Banksia
- Species: B. audax

Binomial name
- Banksia audax C.A.Gardner

= Banksia audax =

Species of shrub endemic to Western Australia

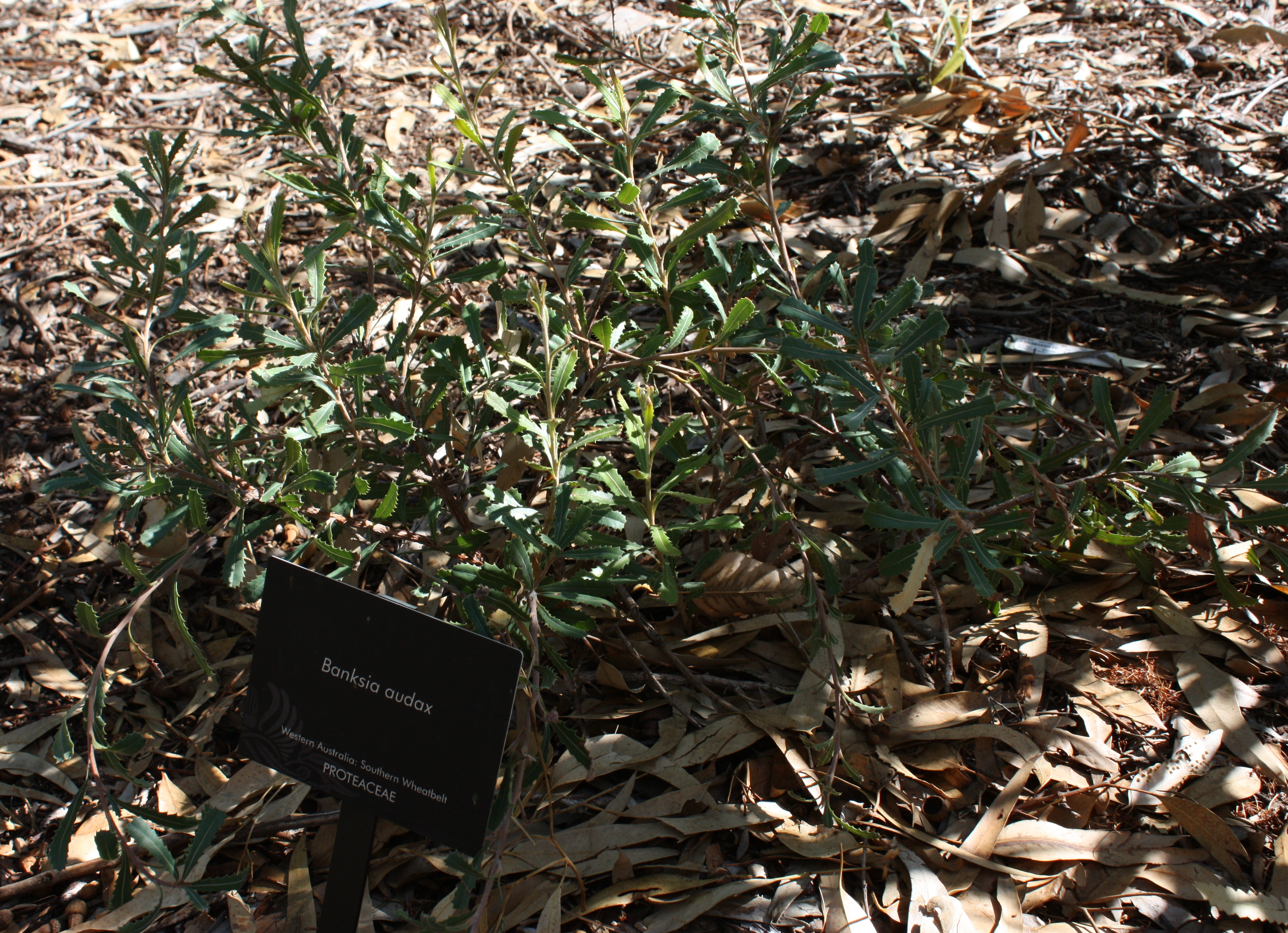
Young specimen in Kings Park, Western Australia

Banksia audax is a species of shrub that is endemic to Western Australia. It has fissured, grey bark, woolly stems, hairy, serrated leaves and golden orange flower spikes.

== Description ==
Banksia audax is a shrub that typically grows to a height of 1 m (3 ft 3 in) and forms a lignotuber. It has fissured, grey bark and branches densely covered with woolly hairs. The leaves are wedge-shaped, hairy on both sides, 20–70 mm (0.79–2.76 in) long and 8–20 mm (0.31–0.79 in) wide with serrated edges. The serrations are triangular, 1–3 mm (0.039–0.118 in) long and sharply pointed. The flower spike is erect, on a short side branch, oval-cylindrical and 50–55 mm (2.0–2.2 in) in diameter as the flowers open. The flowers are golden orange, each with a perianth 20–23 mm (0.79–0.91 in) long and hairy on the outside. Flowering occurs from November to January and there are up to forty elliptic follicles in the spike, each 8–13 mm (0.31–0.51 in) long, 4–5 mm (0.16–0.20 in) high and 4–6 mm (0.16–0.24 in) wide and hairy.

== Taxonomy and naming ==
Banksia audax was first formally described in 1928 by Charles Gardner from specimens he collected in 1926. Gardner gave it the specific name "audax", meaning "bold" in Latin, in recognition of its "boldness" in growing so far inland.

This shrub belongs to subgenus Banksia, section Banksia, series Cyrtostylis. It has no close relatives. B. benthamiana (Bentham's banksia) and B. laevigata (tennis ball banksia) are taxonomically closest to it, but these are both larger shrubs without lignotubers.

== Distribution and habitat ==
Banksia audax occurs from near the town of Southern Cross, south almost to the coast. It occurs amongst heath and in mallee communities, growing in sandy yellow loam.

== Conservation status ==
This banksia is classified as "not threatened" by the Western Australian Government Department of Parks and Wildlife.

== Use in horticulture ==
Seeds do not require any treatment, and take 19 to 46 days to germinate.
