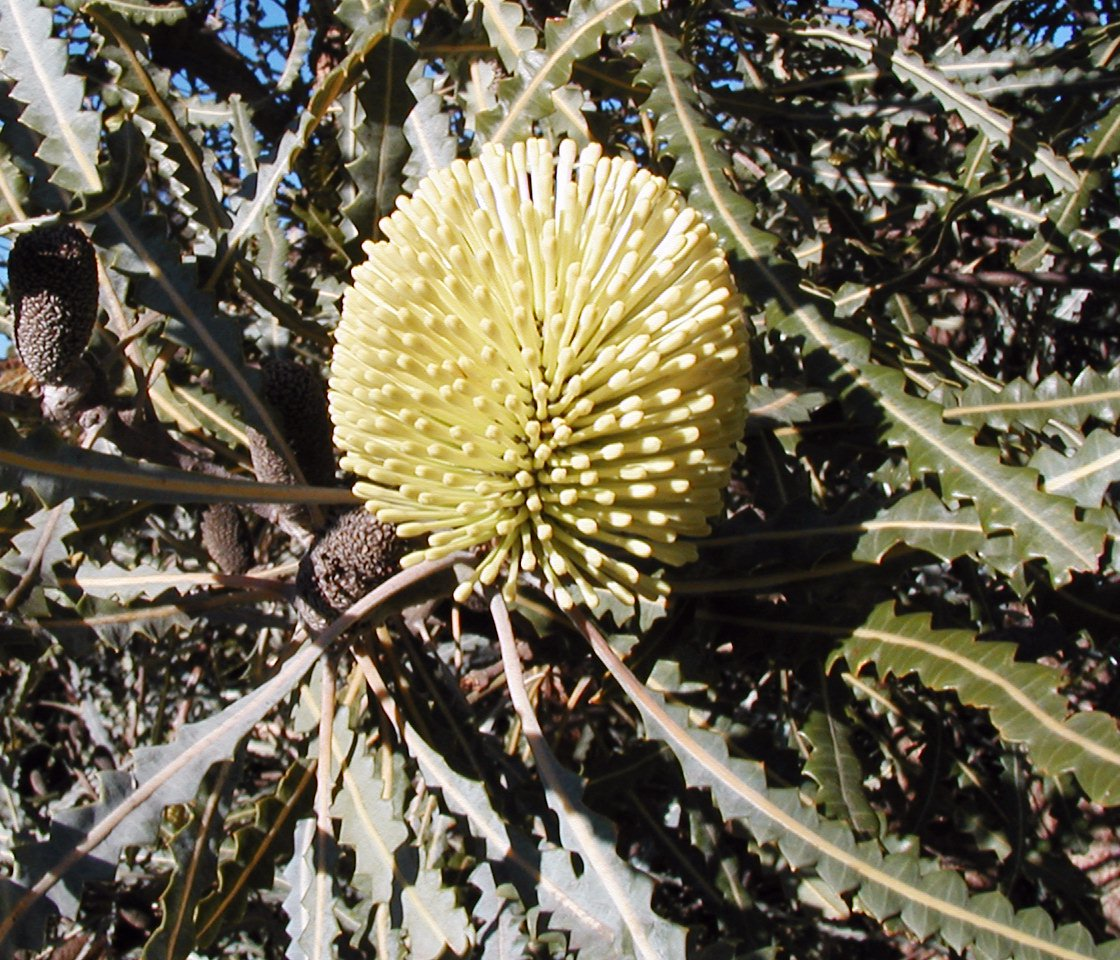
- Cultivated specimen, Perth

Conservation status
- Priority Four — Rare Taxa (DEC)

Scientific classification
- Kingdom: Plantae
- Clade: Tracheophytes
- Clade: Angiosperms
- Clade: Eudicots
- Order: Proteales
- Family: Proteaceae
- Genus: Banksia
- Species: B. elegans

Binomial name
- Banksia elegans Meisn.

Synonyms
- Sirmuellera elegans (Meisn.) Kuntze

= Banksia elegans =

Elegant banksia

Species of shrub endemic to Western Australia

Banksia elegans, commonly known as the elegant banksia, is a species of woody shrub that is endemic to a relatively small area of Western Australia. Reaching 4 m (13 ft) high, it is a suckering shrub that rarely reproduces by seed. The round to oval yellow flower spikes appear in spring and summer. Swiss botanist Carl Meissner described Banksia elegans in 1856. It is most closely related to the three species in the subgenus Isostylis.

== Description ==
Banksia elegans grows as a many-stemmed spreading shrub to 4 m (13 ft) high. It commonly sends up suckers from either the roots or trunk. The trunk is up to 15 cm (5.9 in) in diameter and covered with grey tessellated bark. The new stems are covered with fine hair and become smooth with maturity. New growth mainly occurs in summer. The long thin pale blue-green leaves are 200–460 mm (7.9–18.1 in) long and 12–18 mm (0.47–0.71 in) wide. Their margins are prominently serrated in a saw-tooth pattern with triangular teeth and v-shaped sinuses. The yellow flower spikes, or inflorescences, are oval or spherical and reach 60–70 mm (2.4–2.8 in) in diameter.

A population with particularly large inflorescences existed near Walkaway at the species' northern limit, but was on land cleared for agriculture. Each flower spike is composed of around 400 individual flowers. Over 90% of plants and 99% of flowerheads do not develop follicles and hence set no seed.

== Taxonomy ==
Swiss botanist Carl Meissner described Banksia elegans in 1855, the material having been collected by James Drummond on his sixth collecting trip. He placed it in series Dryandroideae in his 1856 arrangement of the genus on account of its deeply lobed leaves. As they were defined on leaf characters alone, all of Meissner's series were highly heterogeneous. George Bentham published a thorough revision of Banksia in his landmark publication Flora Australiensis in 1870. In Bentham's arrangement, the number of recognised Banksia species was reduced from 60 to 46. Bentham defined four sections based on leaf, style and pollen-presenter characters. Banksia elegans was placed in section Orthostylis.

In 1891, Otto Kuntze, in his Revisio Generum Plantarum, rejected the generic name Banksia L.f., on the grounds that the name Banksia had previously been published in 1776 as Banksia J.R.Forst & G.Forst, referring to the genus now known as Pimelea. Kuntze proposed Sirmuellera as an alternative, referring to this species as Sirmuellera elegans. This application of the principle of priority was largely ignored by Kuntze's contemporaries, and Banksia L.f. was formally conserved and Sirmuellera rejected in 1940.

George was uncertain of its relationships, though noted that the follicles and seed are not unlike those of B. ilicifolia and B. cuneata, and that it clearly had a shortening of its woody axis in the flower spike.

In 2002, a molecular study by Austin Mast showed B. elegans was basal to a group formed by the three members of the subgenus Isostylis, and that its next closest relative was B. attenuata.

In 2005, Mast, Eric Jones and Shawn Havery published the results of their cladistic analyses of DNA sequence data for Banksia. They inferred a phylogeny greatly different from the accepted taxonomic arrangement, including finding Banksia to be paraphyletic with respect to Dryandra. A new taxonomic arrangement was not published at the time, but early in 2007 Mast and Thiele initiated a rearrangement by transferring Dryandra to Banksia, and publishing B. subg. Spathulatae for the species having spoon-shaped cotyledons; in this way they also redefined the autonym B. subg. Banksia. They foreshadowed publishing a full arrangement once DNA sampling of Dryandra was complete. In the meantime, if Mast and Thiele's nomenclatural changes are taken as an interim arrangement, then B. elegans is placed in B. subg. Banksia.

== Distribution and habitat ==
Banksia elegans occurs only over a 65 km^{2} (25 sq mi) area north and west of Eneabba, where it grows in small scattered populations consisting of fewer than 100 plants each. The populations are found between the vicinities of Mt Peron near Jurien Bay and Walkaway, on flat sandplains of less than 50 m (160 ft) in elevation. Stands are often found near winter-wet depressions. The surrounding vegetation is low shrubland or woodland. Associated species include Banksia attenuata, B. prionotes and B. menziesii.

== Ecology ==
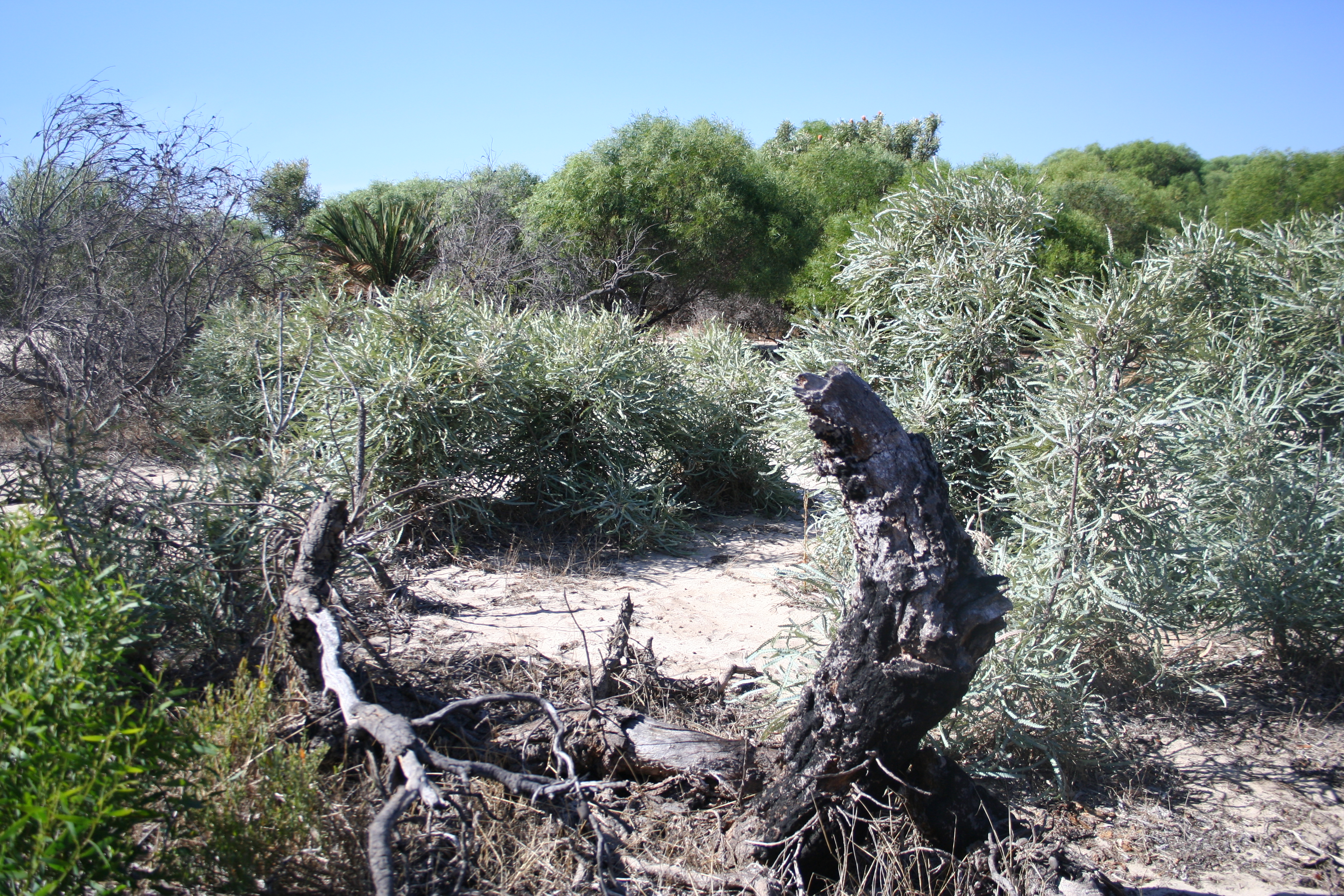
An ancient stump of a dead plant surrounded by regrowth from root suckers, Fraser Road, Western Australia

Banksia elegans sets an extremely low amount of seed, and appears to reproduce predominantly by suckering, despite prolific flowering and low rates of flower and follicle predation. Developing seeds are also often aborted. A population studied in one field study produced an average of only two seeds per plant in sixteen years. Populations begin flowering three years after bushfire, and regenerate after fire from large underground lignotubers as well as sending up suckers. One field study found no seedlings at all post-bushfire, suggesting the shift to vegetative propagation maybe more marked than thought previously.

An assessment of the potential impact of climate change on this species found that its range is unlikely to contract and may actually grow, depending on how effectively it migrates into newly habitable areas.

== Conservation status ==
This banksia is classified as "Priority Four" by the Government of Western Australia Department of Parks and Wildlife, meaning that is rare or near threatened.

== Use in horticulture ==
Seeds do not require any treatment, and take 19 to 48 days to germinate.
