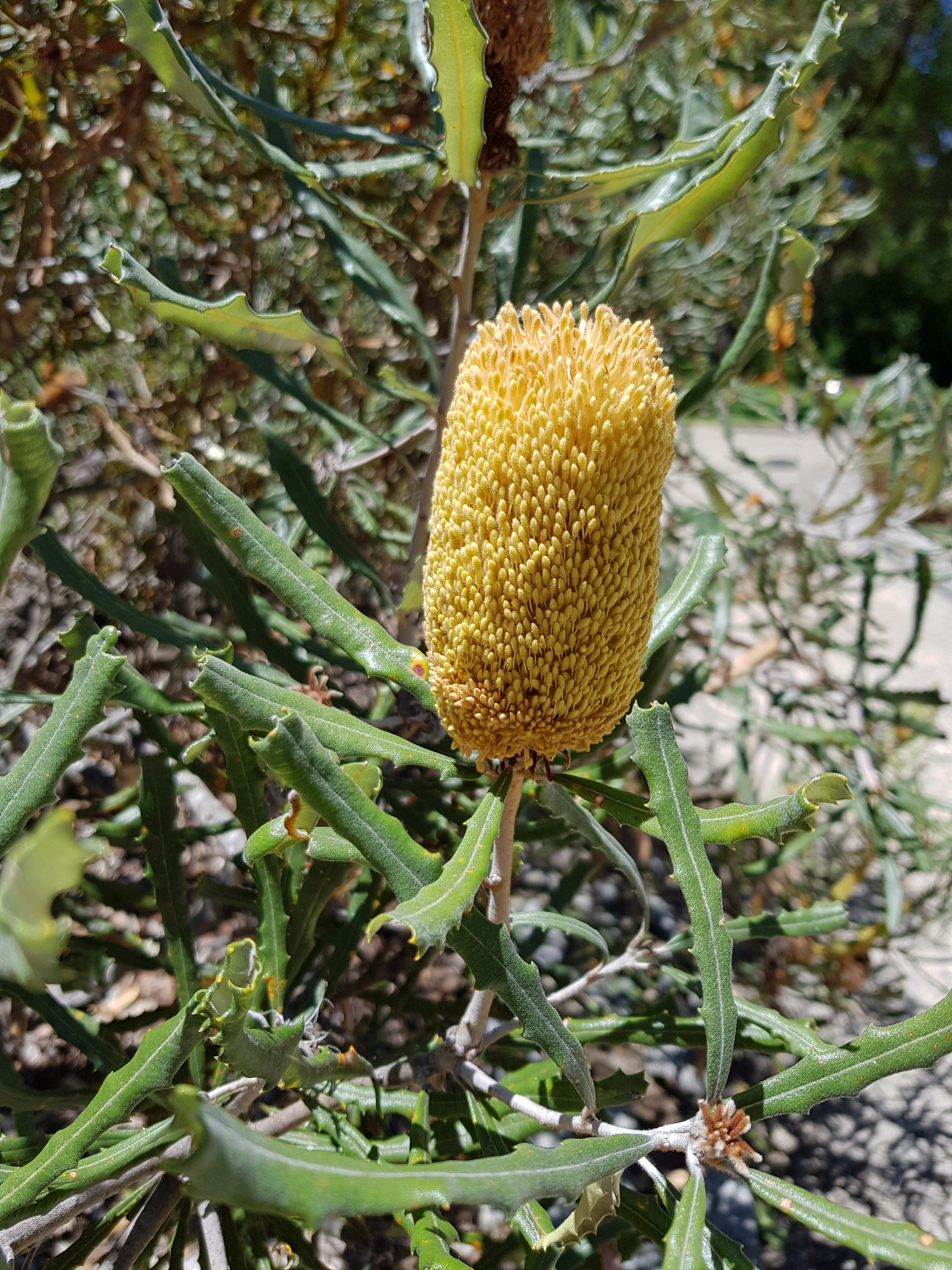
- Banksia pilostylis in Kings Park

Scientific classification
- Kingdom: Plantae
- Clade: Tracheophytes
- Clade: Angiosperms
- Clade: Eudicots
- Order: Proteales
- Family: Proteaceae
- Genus: Banksia
- Subgenus: Banksia subg. Banksia
- Species: B. pilostylis

Binomial name
- Banksia pilostylis C.A.Gardner

= Banksia pilostylis =

Species of shrub native to Western Australia

Banksia pilostylis is a species of shrub that is endemic to the south-west of Western Australia. It has hard, fissured bark, narrow wedge-shaped, serrated leaves, pale yellow flowers in cylindrical spikes and elliptical follicles that open when heated in a bushfire.

== Description ==
Banksia pilostylis is a shrub that typically grows to a height of 4 m (13 ft) and has hard, fissured bark but does not form a lignotuber. The leaves are serrated, narrow wedge-shaped, 50–160 mm (2.0–6.3 in) long and 5–20 mm (0.20–0.79 in) wide on a petiole 4–6 mm (0.16–0.24 in) long. The flowers are pale yellow and closely packed in a cylindrical spike 50–100 mm (2.0–3.9 in) long and 50–55 mm (2.0–2.2 in) wide with hairy involucral bracts 5–20 mm (0.20–0.79 in) long at the base of the spike. The perianth is 20–24 mm (0.79–0.94 in) long and the pistil 23–27 mm (0.91–1.06 in) long and curved. Flowering occurs from October to January and up to twenty-five elliptical follicles 22–35 mm (0.87–1.38 in) long and 10–16 mm (0.39–0.63 in) wide, surrounded by the remains of the flowers, develop in each spike. The follicles usually remain closed until the plant is killed in a bushfire.

== Taxonomy and naming ==
Banksia pilostylis was first formally described in 1964 by Charles Gardner in the Journal of the Royal Society of Western Australia from specimens he collected in October 1960. The specific epithet (pilostylis) is from Latin and refers to the hairy style.

In 1981, George placed this species in the series Cyrtostylis. Cladistic analysis in a 1996 paper by Kevin Thiele and Pauline Ladiges confirmed that placement.

== Distribution and habitat ==
This banksia grow in shrubland and low woodland near the south coast of Western Australia between Ravenshorpe and Israelite Bay.

== Conservation status ==
Banksia pilostylis is classified as "not threatened" by the Western Australian Government Department of Parks and Wildlife.

== Use in horticulture ==
Seeds do not require any treatment, and take 18 to 49 days to germinate.
