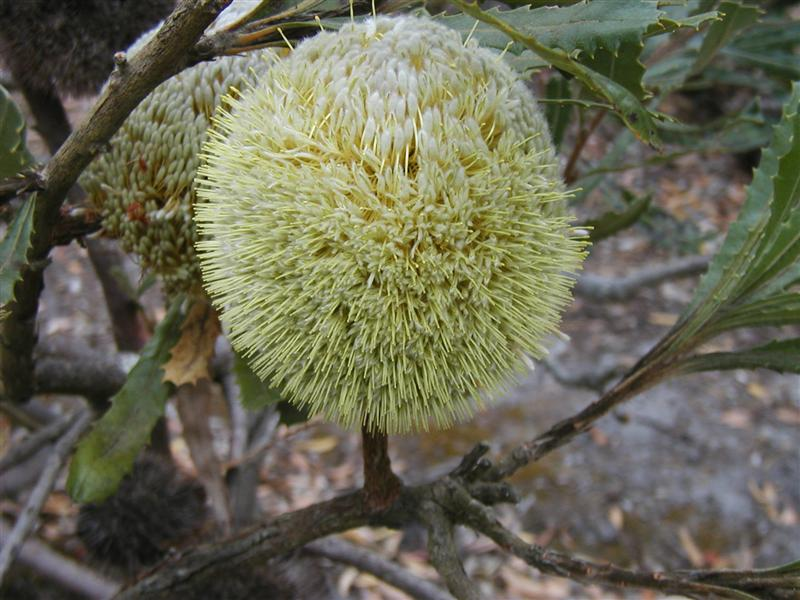
- Banksia laevigata subsp. laevigata in cultivation at The Banksia Farm
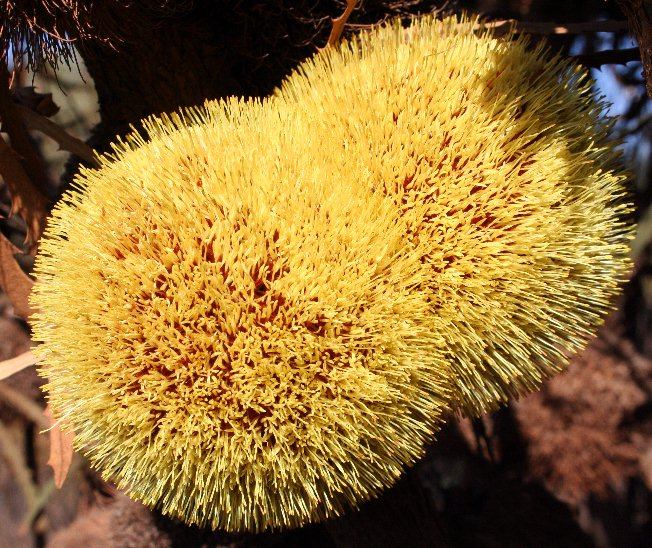
- Subspecies fuscolutea

Scientific classification
- Kingdom: Plantae
- Clade: Tracheophytes
- Clade: Angiosperms
- Clade: Eudicots
- Order: Proteales
- Family: Proteaceae
- Genus: Banksia
- Subgenus: Banksia subg. Banksia
- Species: B. laevigata

Binomial name
- Banksia laevigata Meisn.

Synonyms
- Banksia laevigata Meisn. (1852) nom. inval., nom. nud.; Sirmuellera laevigata (Meisn.) Kuntze

= Banksia laevigata =

Tennis ball banksia

Species of shrub endemic to Western Australia

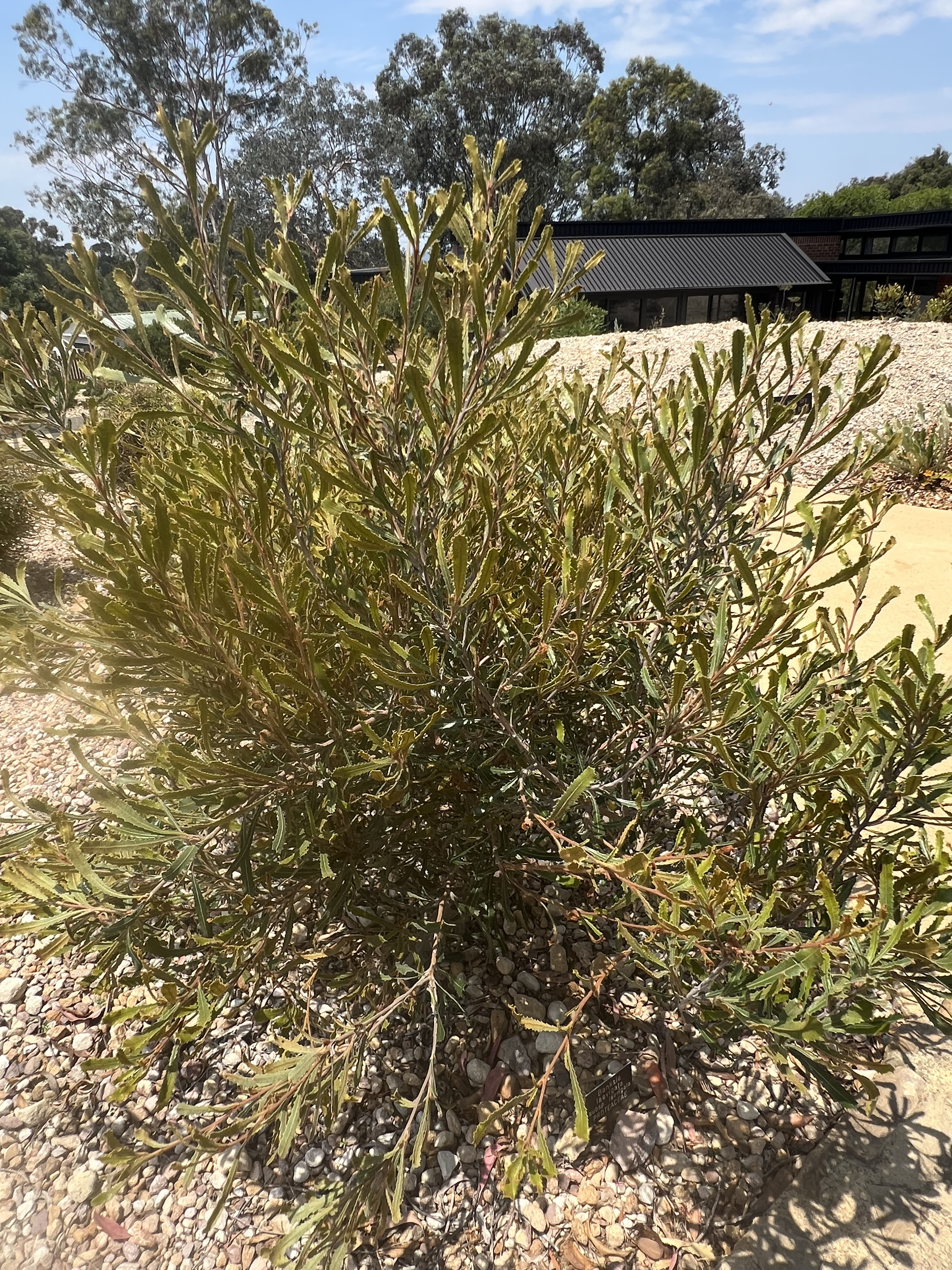
Banksia laevigata subsp. laevigata habit

Banksia laevigata, commonly known as the tennis ball banksia, is a species of shrub that is endemic to Western Australia. It has serrated, broadly linear to narrow wedge-shaped leaves, yellow or yellowish green flowers, depending on subspecies, and linear to elliptic follicles with a slightly wrinkled surface.

== Description ==
Banksia laevigata is a shrub that typically grows to a height of 1–3.5 m (3 ft 3 in – 11 ft 6 in) and has roughly flaky, grey bark but does not form a lignotuber. The leaves are serrated, broadly linear to narrow wedge-shaped, 50–140 mm (2.0–5.5 in) long and 4–20 mm (0.16–0.79 in) wide on a petiole 5–10 mm (0.20–0.39 in) long. Both surface of young leaves are hairy but become glabrous with age. The flowers are borne in spherical heads 70–80 mm (2.8–3.1 in) wide, usually on the ends of short side branches. The flowers are yellow or yellowish green and have a perianth 20–26 mm (0.79–1.02 in) long and a curved pistil 30–32 mm (1.2–1.3 in) long. Flowering occurs from September to December or from January to February and the follicles are linear to elliptical, 10–18 mm (0.39–0.71 in) long, 3–7 mm (0.12–0.28 in) high and 4–7 mm (0.16–0.28 in) wide. Each head contains up to 100 follicles surrounded by the remains of the flowers.

== Taxonomy and naming ==
Banksia laevigata was first formally described in 1856 by Carl Meissner in de Candolle's Prodromus Systematis Naturalis Regni Vegetabilis from specimens collected by James Drummond in the Swan River Colony. The specific epithet (laevigata) is a Latin word meaning "smooth and polished".

In 1891, Otto Kuntze, in his Revisio Generum Plantarum, rejected the generic name Banksia L.f., on the grounds that the name Banksia had previously been published in 1776 as Banksia J.R.Forst & G.Forst, referring to the genus now known as Pimelea. Kuntze proposed Sirmuellera as an alternative, referring to this species as Sirmuellera laevigata. This application of the principle of priority was largely ignored by Kuntze's contemporaries, and Banksia L.f. was formally conserved and Sirmuellera rejected in 1940.

In 1965, Alex George described two subspecies in The Western Australian Naturalist and the names are accepted by the Australian Plant Census:

- Banksia laevigata subsp. fuscolutea that bright yellow perianth with rusty hairs;
- Banksia laevigata subsp. laevigata that has a creamy grey perianth with grey hairs.

== Distribution and habitat ==
Subspecies fuscolutea is more widespread than the autonym and grows in shrubland between Lake Barker, Hyden and Mount Day near Norseman. Subspecies laevigata is found in the Ravensthorpe Range and along the Fitzgerald River where it grows in woodland and shrubland.

== Conservation status ==
Subspecies fuscolutea is classified as "not threatened" by the Western Australian Government Department of Parks and Wildlife, but subsp. laevigata is classified as "Priority Four" is classified as "Priority Four" by the Government of Western Australia Department of Parks and Wildlife, meaning that is rare or near threatened.

== Use in horticulture ==
Seeds do not require any treatment, and take 39 to 92 days to germinate.
