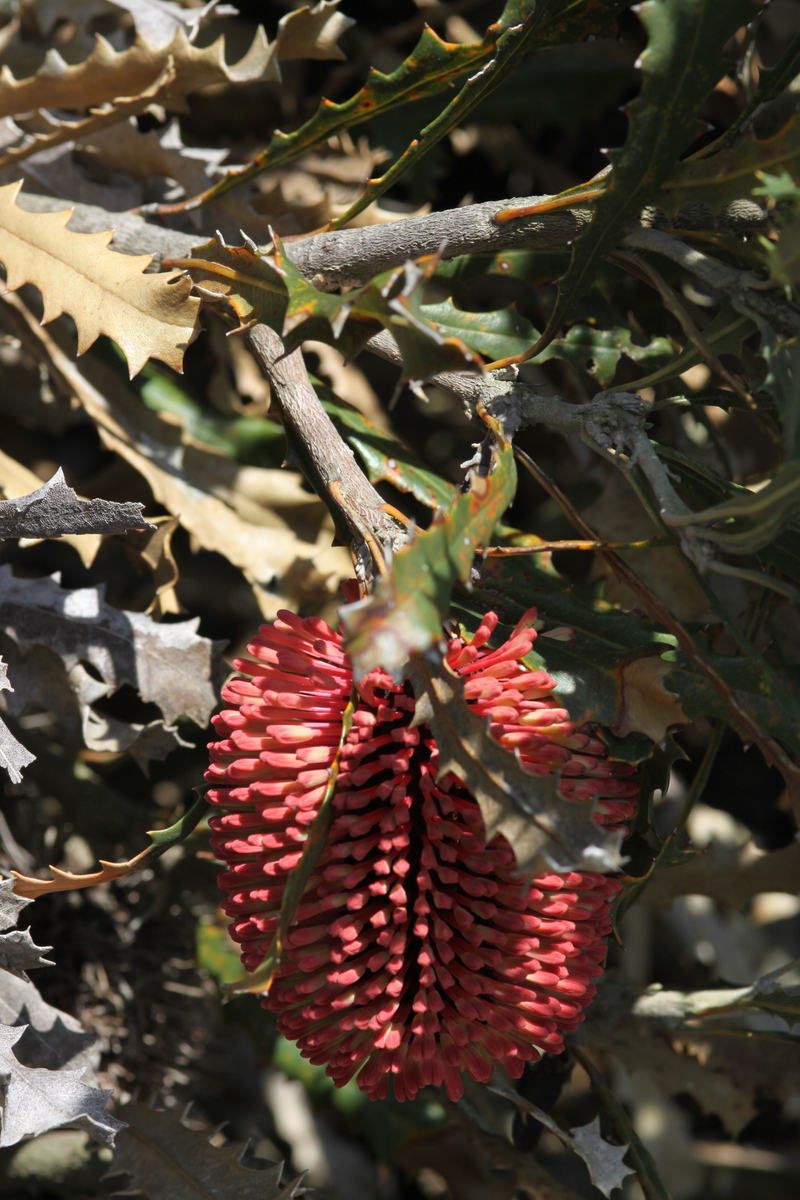

Scientific classification
- Kingdom: Plantae
- Clade: Embryophytes
- Clade: Tracheophytes
- Clade: Spermatophytes
- Clade: Angiosperms
- Clade: Eudicots
- Order: Proteales
- Family: Proteaceae
- Genus: Banksia
- Species: B. caleyi

Binomial name
- Banksia caleyi R.Br.

Synonyms
- Banksia caleyi R.Br. var. caleyi; Banksia caleyi var. sinuosa Meisn.; Sirmuellera caleyi (R.Br.) Kuntze

= Banksia caleyi =

Australian species of shrub, the red lantern banksia

Banksia caleyi, commonly known as Caley's banksia or red lantern banksia, is a species of woody shrub of the family Proteaceae native to Western Australia. It generally grows as a dense shrub up to 2 m (7 ft) tall, has serrated leaves and red, pendent (hanging) inflorescences which are generally hidden in the foliage. First described by Scottish naturalist Robert Brown in 1830, Banksia caleyi was named in honour of the English botanist George Caley. No subspecies are recognised. It is one of three or four related species with hanging inflorescences, which is an unusual feature within the genus.

Found south and east of the Stirling Ranges through to the vicinity of Jerramungup, Banksia caleyi grows in a habitat marked by periodic bushfires. Plants are killed by fire and regenerate by seed afterwards. The species was classified as "Not Threatened" under the Wildlife Conservation Act of Western Australia. In contrast to most other Western Australian banksias, it appears to have some resistance to dieback from the soil-borne water mould Phytophthora cinnamomi, and is comparatively easy to grow in cultivation.

== Description ==
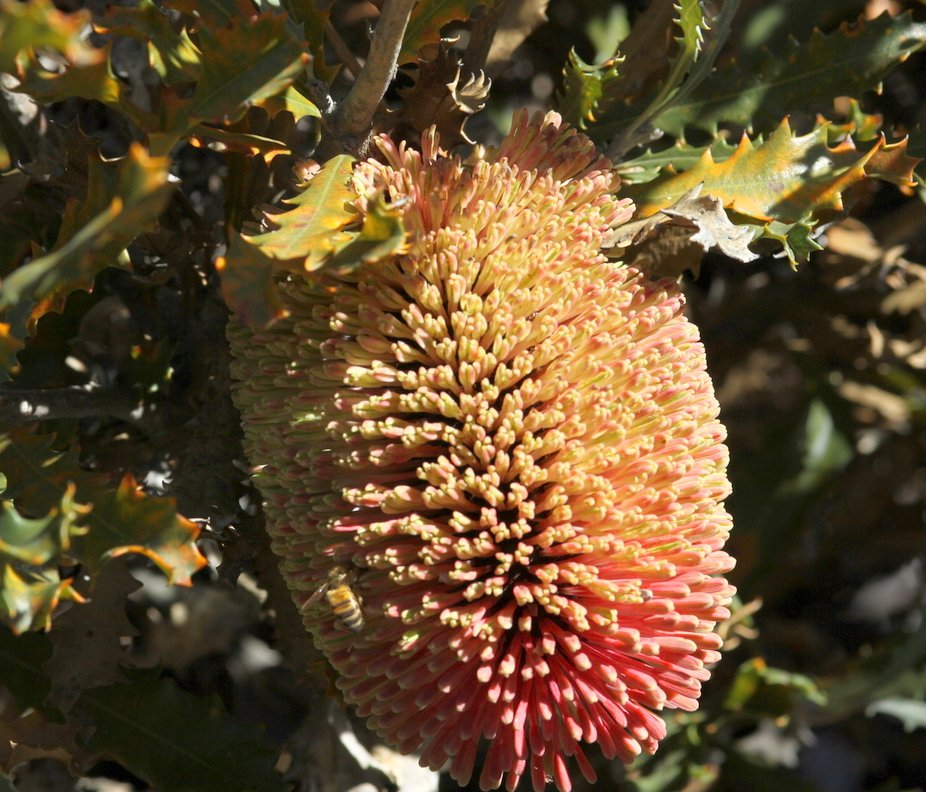
Cream and pink flowers

Banksia caleyi grows as a many-branched bushy shrub to 2 m (7 ft) in height, with crumbly grey bark. Rarely, plants of up to 4 m (13 ft) have been found. The new growth is hairy, and generally occurs in summer. The branchlets become smooth after around two years. The stiff leaves are narrowly wedge-shaped (cuneate) and measure 5–14 cm (2–5 1/2 in) in length by 1.3–2.4 cm (1/2–1 in) wide. The leaf margins are serrated, with many teeth measuring 0.4–0.6 cm (1/8–1/4 in) each.

Flowering takes place between September and January. The inflorescences hang down from the ends of three- to five-year-old branchlets deep within the shrub and measure 5–9 cm (2–3 1/2 in) in length and roughly 7 cm (2 3/4 in) in diameter. The flowers are cream at the base and deep pink to red in the upper half, and are brightest before anthesis and then gradually fade with age. The inflorescences eventually turn grey, the old flowers remaining as up to 25 large woody follicles develop. Oval in shape and covered with fine hair, the follicles can reach 4 cm (1 5/8 in) long, 2.5 cm (1 in) high, and 2.5 cm (1 in) wide.

The obovate seed is 4.3–4.7 cm (1 3/4–1 7/8 in) long and fairly flattened, and is composed of the wedge-shaped seed body proper, measuring 1.4–1.5 cm (1/2–5/8 in) long and 1.6–1.7 cm (5/8 in) wide, and a papery wing. One side, termed the outer surface, is dark brown and wrinkled, while the other is black and smooth. Both surfaces sparkle slightly. The seeds are separated by a sturdy dark brown seed separator that is roughly the same shape as the seeds with a depression where the seed body sits adjacent to it in the follicle. Seedlings have cuneate cotyledons which measure 1.1–1.3 cm (3/8–1/2 in) long and 1.3–1.4 cm (1/2 in) wide. These are dull green with three veins, and the margin of the wedge may be red and crenulated (lined with small teeth). The hypocotyl is red and measures 1.5–2 cm (5/8–3/4 in) high. Seedlings have hairy stems and leaves that are oppositely arranged (arising from the stem in pairs) that are obovate with triangular-lobed serrate margins.

== Taxonomy ==
Robert Brown formally described Banksia caleyi in his 1830 work Supplementum primum Prodromi florae Novae Hollandiae, naming it in honour of the English botanist George Caley. The type specimen was collected by William Baxter, inland from King George Sound on Western Australia's south coast, in 1829.

Carl Meissner placed B. caleyi in series Quercinae in his 1856 arrangement of the genus on account of its strongly dentate, cuneate to obovate leaves. As they were defined on leaf characters alone, all of Meissner's series were highly heterogeneous. Meissner also described B. caleyi variety sinuosa from material collected by James Drummond, which was reviewed by Alex George and found to be no different from the other collections of B. caleyi. Drummond also collected material identified as B. caleyi that was named as a distinct species—Banksia aculeata—in 1981. No subspecies of B. caleyi itself are recognised.

George Bentham published a thorough revision of Banksia in his landmark publication Flora Australiensis in 1870. In Bentham's arrangement, the number of recognised Banksia species was reduced from 60 to 46. Bentham defined four sections based on leaf, style and pollen-presenter characters. Banksia caleyi was placed in section Orthostylis. In 1891, Otto Kuntze, in his Revisio Generum Plantarum, rejected the generic name Banksia L.f., on the grounds that the name Banksia had previously been published in 1776 as Banksia J.R.Forst & G.Forst, referring to the genus now known as Pimelea. Kuntze proposed Sirmuellera as an alternative, referring to this species as Sirmuellera caleyi. This application of the principle of priority was largely ignored by Kuntze's contemporaries, and Banksia L.f. was formally conserved and Sirmuellera rejected in 1940.

In his 1981 monograph The genus Banksia L.f. (Proteaceae), Alex George placed B. caleyi in B. subg. Banksia because its inflorescence is a typical Banksia flower spike shape; in B. sect. Banksia because of its straight styles; and B. ser. Tetragonae because of its pendulous inflorescences. He considered its closest relative to be B. aculeata, which has narrower leaves with fewer, larger lobes; longer perianths, which grade from red to cream rather than from cream to red; shorter pistils; and also differences in the follicles, seeds and flowering time.

In 1996, Kevin Thiele and Pauline Ladiges published the results of a cladistic analysis of morphological characters of Banksia. They retained George's subgenera and many of his series, but discarded his sections. George's B. ser. Tetragonae was found to be monophyletic, and therefore retained; and their analysis of the relationships within the series supported the placement of B. caleyi alongside B. aculeata.

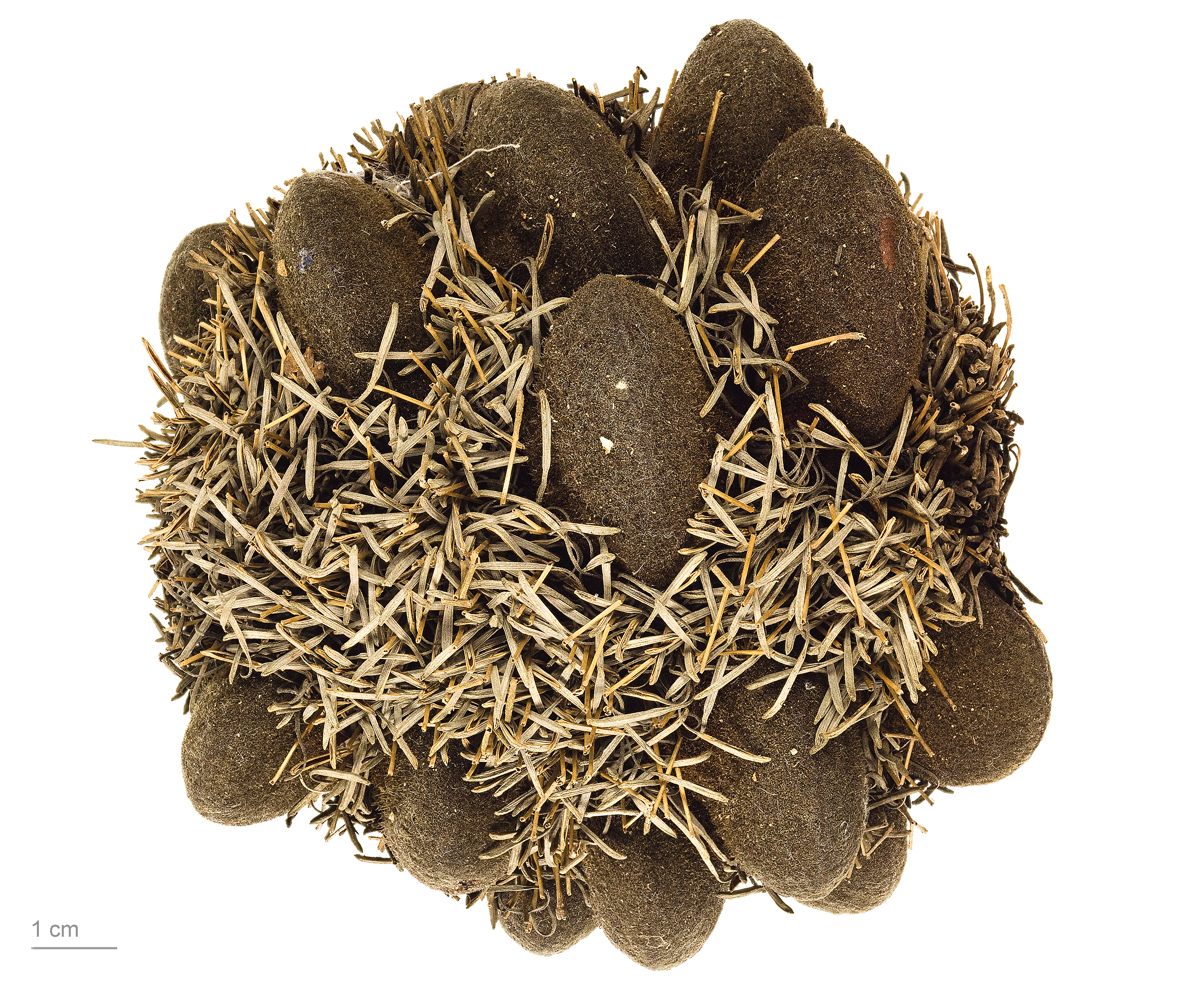
Old flower spike showing large follicles

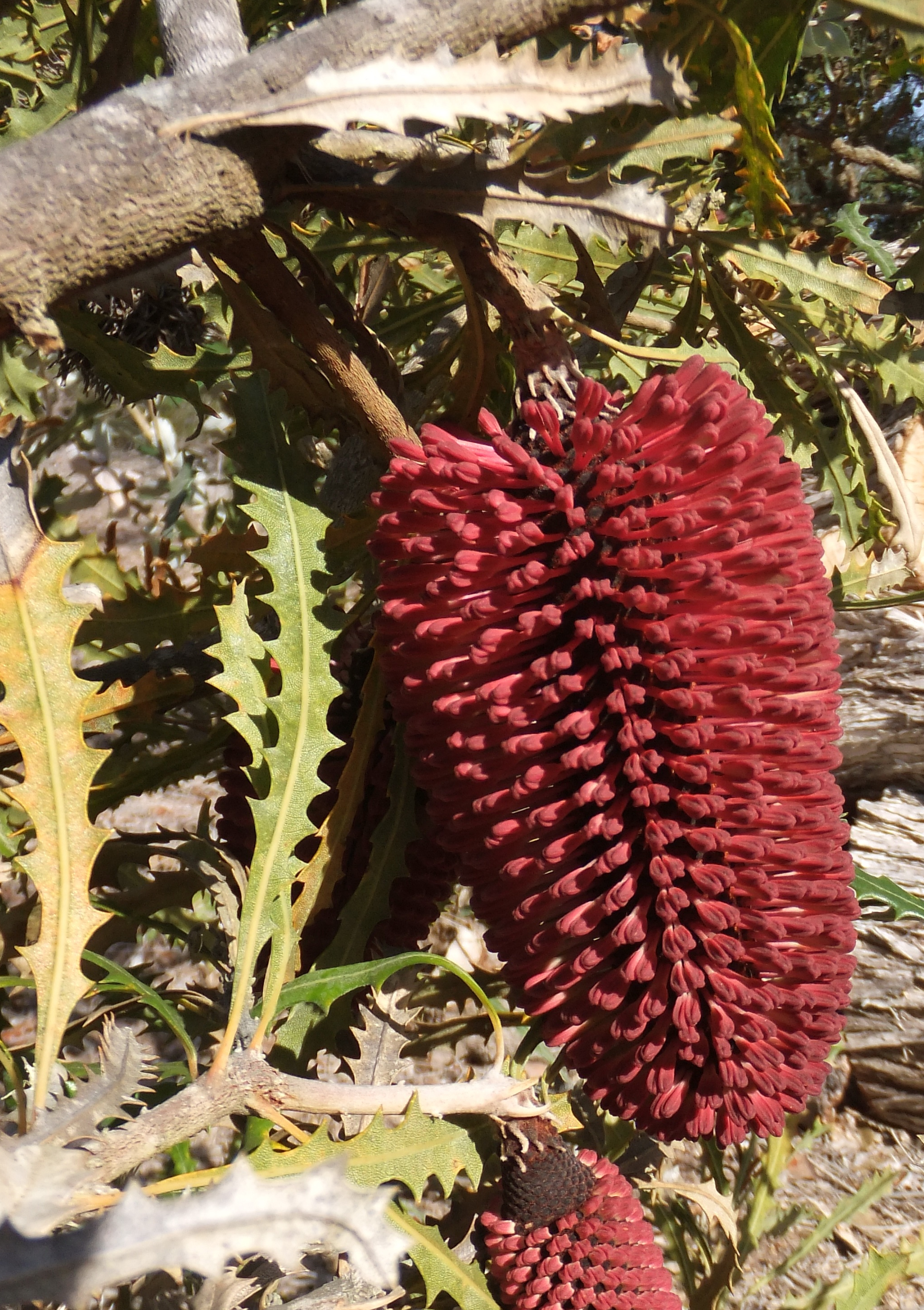
Shrub in cultivation at Mount Barker, Western Australia

B. caleyi's placement in Thiele and Ladiges' arrangement may be summarised as follows:

Banksia

B. subg. Isostylis (3 species)
B. elegans (incertae sedis)
B. subg. Banksia

B. ser. Tetragonae

B. elderiana
B. lemanniana
B. caleyi
B. aculeata

The arrangement of Thiele and Ladiges was not accepted by George, and was discarded in his 1999 revision. Under George's 1999 arrangement, B. caleyi's placement was as follows:

Banksia

B. subg. Banksia

B. sect. Banksia

B. ser. Salicinae (11 species, 7 subspecies)
B. ser. Grandes (2 species)
B. ser. Banksia (8 species)
B. ser. Crocinae (4 species)
B. ser. Prostratae (6 species, 3 varieties)
B. ser. Cyrtostylis (13 species)
B. ser. Tetragonae

B. lemanniana
B. caleyi
B. aculeata

Since 1998, Austin Mast has been publishing results of ongoing cladistic analyses of DNA sequence data for the subtribe Banksiinae. His analyses suggest a phylogeny that is rather different from previous taxonomic arrangements, but support the placement of B. aculeata alongside B. caleyi in a clade corresponding closely with B. ser. Tetragonae.

Early in 2007, Mast and Thiele initiated a rearrangement by transferring Dryandra to Banksia, and publishing B. subg. Spathulatae for the species having spoon-shaped cotyledons; in this way, they also redefined the autonym B. subg. Banksia. They have refrained from publishing a full arrangement of Banksia until DNA sampling of Dryandra is complete; in the meantime, if Mast and Thiele's nomenclatural changes are taken as an interim arrangement, then B. caleyi is placed in B. subg. Banksia.

== Distribution and habitat ==
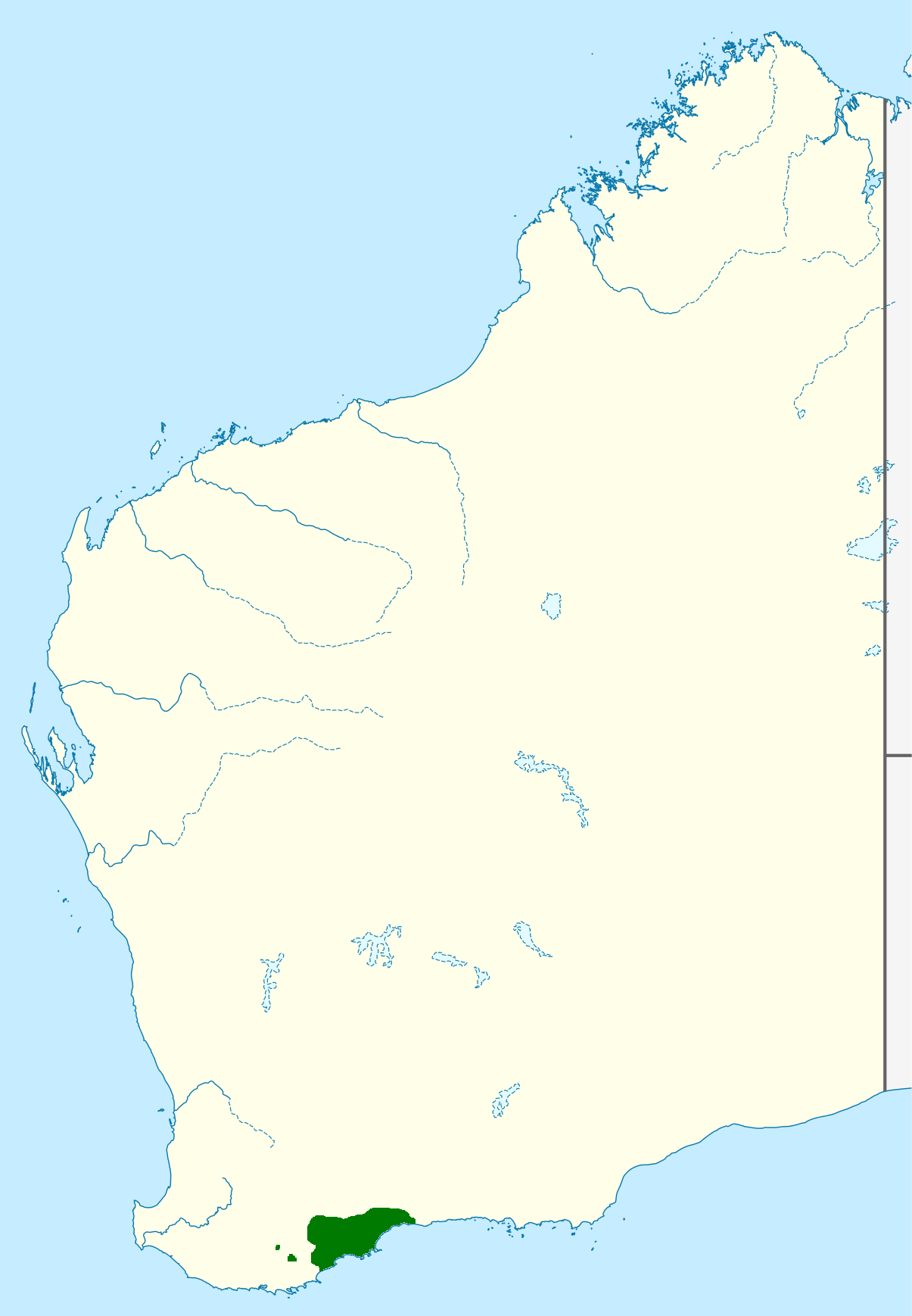
Distribution in southern Western Australia

Banksia caleyi is found near the southern coast of Western Australia, from South Stirling to the West River and northeast to Pingrup. Some of its population lies within Fitzgerald River National Park. Often locally abundant, it is found in mallee woodland on white sand, gravel, and sandy clay, generally on flat or slightly undulating land. The annual rainfall is 550–600 mm (22–24 in). Banksia caleyi is classified as Not Threatened under the Wildlife Conservation Act of Western Australia.

== Ecology ==
Like many plants in south-west Western Australia, Banksia caleyi is adapted to an environment in which bushfire events are relatively frequent. Most Banksia species can be placed in one of two broad groups according to their response to fire: Reseeders are killed by fire, but fire triggers the release of their canopy seed bank, thus promoting recruitment of the next generation. Resprouters survive fire, resprouting from a lignotuber or, more rarely, epicormic buds protected by thick bark. B. caleyi belongs to the reseeder group. In the wild, seedlings take at least three to four years to reach flowering after bushfire. Non-patchy fires occurring at intervals of less than seven years may wipe out local populations of reseeders.

Banksia caleyi has been shown to have a low susceptibility to dieback from the soil-borne water mould Phytophthora cinnamomi, unlike most Western Australian banksias. The fungal pathogen Botryosphaeria ribis has been recovered from B. caleyi. The caterpillar of the dryandra moth (Carthaea saturnioides) feeds on the leaves, though it prefers to eat those of dryandra species that grow alongside it.

The upside-down flower spikes drip nectar onto the ground or lower leaves, suggesting pollination by nonflying mammals which are attracted to the scent. Supporting this hypothesis, the spiky leaves seem to also prevent access to foragers not at ground level. Furthermore, the individual flower structure is similar to Banksia attenuata, for which the honey possum (Tarsipes rostratus) is a major pollinator.

== Cultivation ==
Seeds do not require any treatment, and take 23 to 50 days to germinate in cultivation. Banksia caleyi is a medium- slow-growing plant, taking four to five years to flower from seed. The flowers are attractive but are obscured by the foliage. This species can grow in a range of soil types so long as they provide good drainage. The nominal soil pH range is from 6 to 7.5. It grows in full sun and partly shaded situations, and tolerates light pruning. Unlike many other Western Australian banksias, Banksia caleyi has had some degree of success in growing in more humid areas, such as Australia's east coast. It attracts pygmy and honey possums in the garden.
