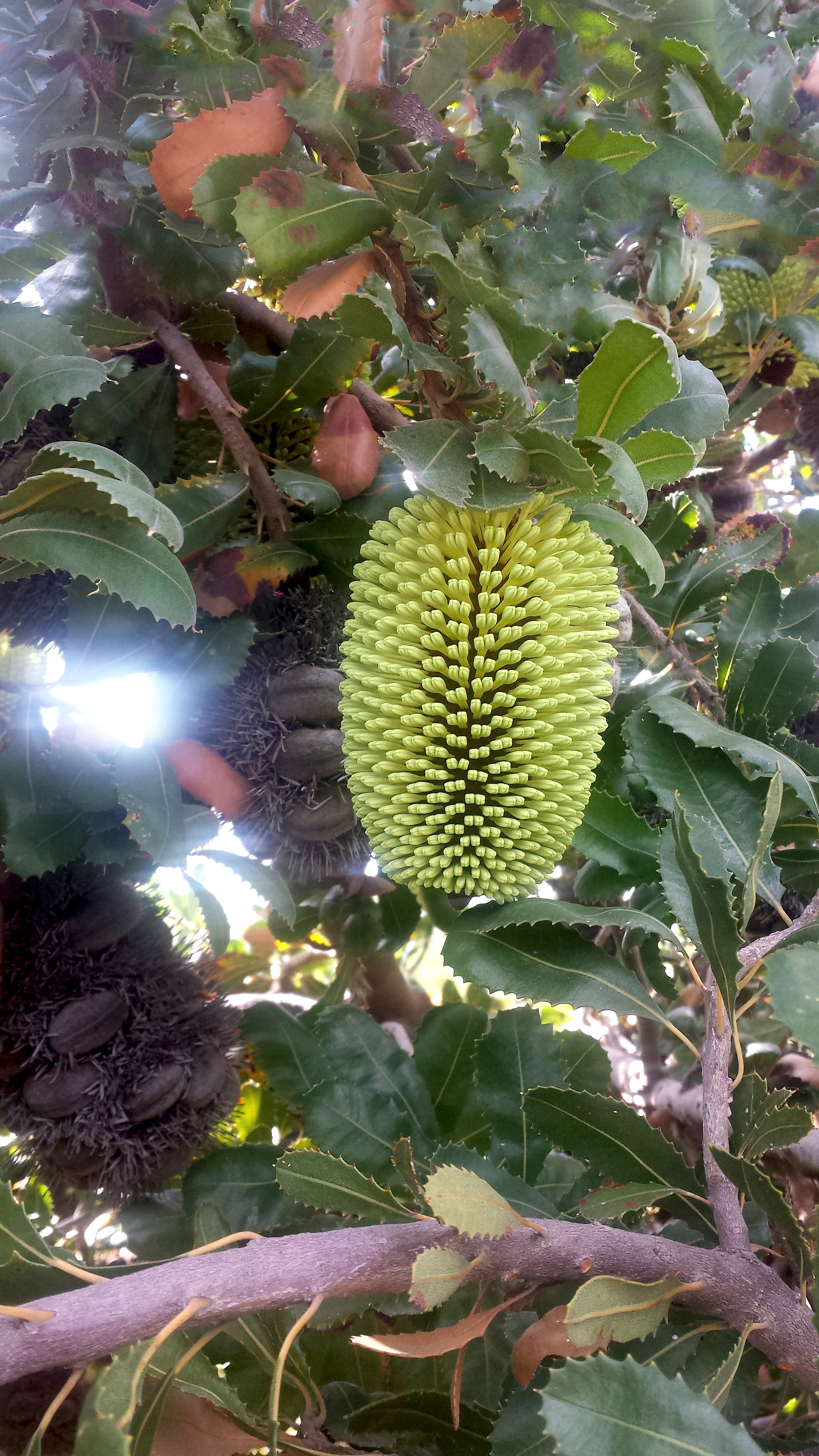

Scientific classification
- Kingdom: Plantae
- Clade: Tracheophytes
- Clade: Angiosperms
- Clade: Eudicots
- Order: Proteales
- Family: Proteaceae
- Genus: Banksia
- Subgenus: Banksia subg. Banksia
- Section: Banksia sect. Banksia
- Series: Banksia ser. Tetragonae
- Species: B. lemanniana

Binomial name
- Banksia lemanniana Meisn.

Synonyms
- Sirmuellera lemanniana (Meisn.) Kuntze

= Banksia lemanniana =

Species of shrub native to Western Australia

Banksia lemanniana, the yellow lantern banksia or Lemann's banksia, is a species of flowering plant in the family Proteaceae, native to Western Australia. It generally grows as an open woody shrub or small tree to 5 m (16 ft) high, with stiff serrated leaves and unusual hanging inflorescences. Flowering occurs over summer, the greenish buds developing into oval flower spikes before turning grey and developing the characteristic large woody follicles. It occurs within and just east of the Fitzgerald River National Park on the southern coast of the state. B. lemanniana is killed by bushfire and regenerates from seed.

Described by Swiss botanist Carl Meissner in 1856, Banksia lemanniana was named in honour of English botanist Charles Morgan Lemann. It is one of three or four related species all with pendent inflorescences, which is an unusual feature of banksias. No subspecies are recognised. Banksia lemanniana is classified as Not Threatened under the Wildlife Conservation Act of Western Australia. Unlike many Western Australian banksias, it appears to have some resistance to dieback from the soil-borne water mould Phytophthora cinnamomi, and is one of the easier Western Australian species to grow in cultivation.

== Description ==
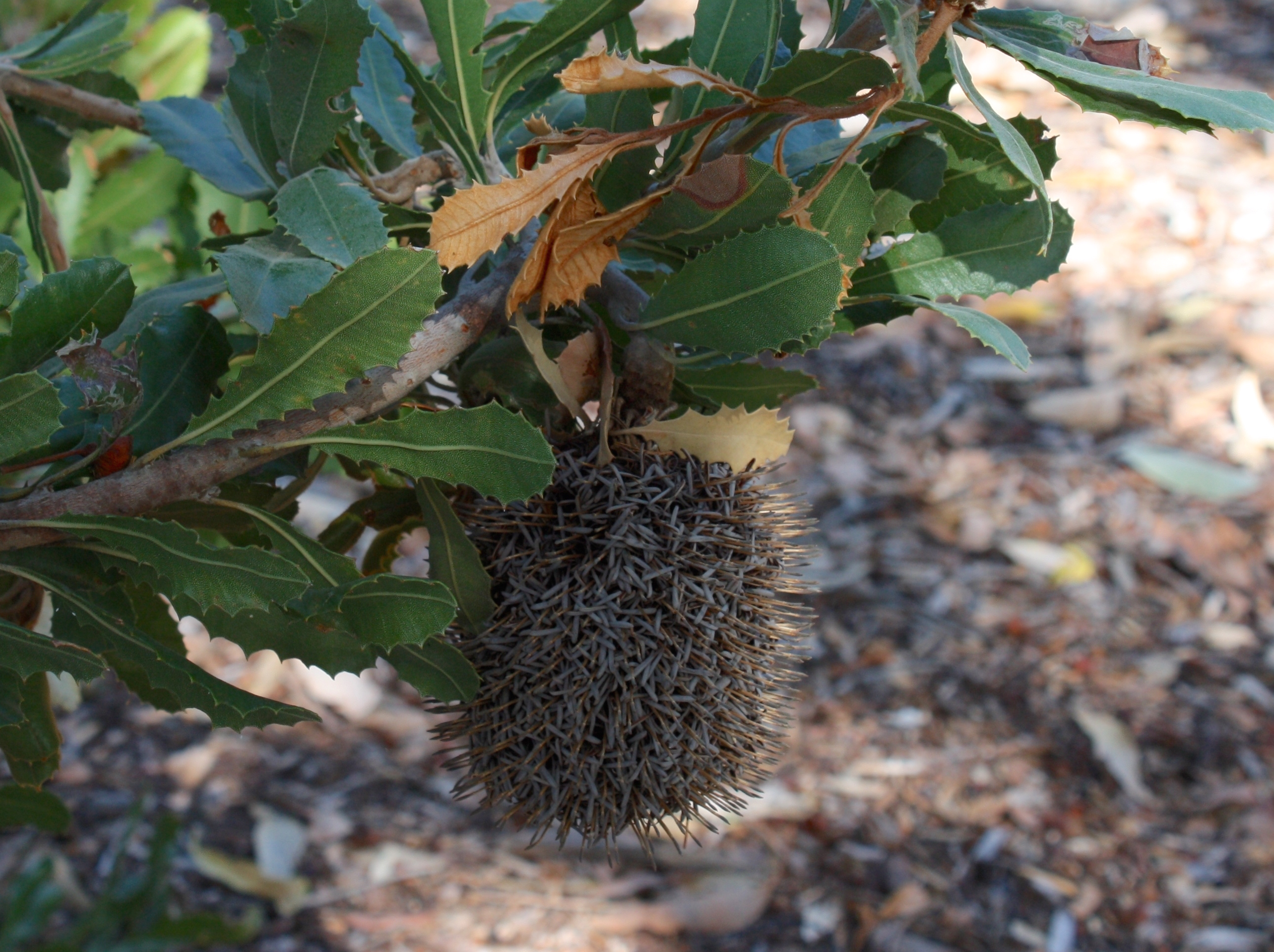
An aged grey inflorescence, showing persistent flowers

Banksia lemanniana grows as an open shrub or, less commonly, a small tree to 5 m (16 ft) in height, with a spreading habit. The trunk has thin grey bark and can reach a diameter of 15 cm (5.9 in). Lower-growing plants that reach 1.6 m (5.2 ft) have been reported from coastal areas of Fitzgerald River National Park. The new growth is finely hairy and predominantly seen in summer, before losing its hair and becoming glabrous (smooth) over two years. The stiff leaves are narrowly wedge-shaped or more oval (cuneate to obovate) and measure 3–9 cm (1.2–3.5 in) in length by 1.2–3 cm (0.47–1.18 in) wide. The leaf margins are serrated, with many teeth measuring 0.1 to 0.3 cm each.

Flowering typically occurs between October and January. Unlike those of most other banksias, the cylindrical inflorescences hang down from branchlets and measure 5–11 cm (2–4 in) in length and 8–10 cm (3.1–3.9 in) in diameter. They are green-yellow in colour and smell of honey, dripping large amounts of nectar. The buds are a rich chocolate brown in colour until the yellow flowers push through. The inflorescences turn grey as they age, and the old flowers remain as up to 20 large woody follicles develop. Oval in shape, wrinkled in texture and covered with fine hair, they can reach 4.5 cm (1.8 in) long, 3 cm (1.2 in) high, and 3 cm (1.2 in) wide.

The obovate seed is 4–4.7 cm (1.6–1.9 in) long and fairly flattened, and is composed of the wedge-shaped seed body proper, measuring 1.2–1.5 cm (0.5–0.6 in) long and 1–1.3 cm (0.4–0.5 in) wide, and a papery wing. One side, termed the outer surface, is dark brown and wrinkled, while the other is black and smooth. Both surfaces sparkle slightly. The seeds are separated by a sturdy dark brown seed separator that is roughly the same shape as the seeds with a depression where the seed body sits adjacent to it in the follicle. Seedlings have cuneate (wedge-shaped) cotyledons which measure 1.2–1.5 cm (0.5–0.6 in) long and 1.5–1.8 cm (0.6–0.7 in) wide. These are dull green, sometimes with a reddish tinge, and the margin of the wedge may be crenulated (lined with small teeth). The hypocotyl is red and measures 1–2 cm (0.39–0.79 in) high and 0.25–0.3 cm (0.098–0.118 in) wide.

== Taxonomy ==
The first known botanical collection of B. lemanniana was made by James Drummond in early 1847, during a voyage of botanical exploration through the Stirling Ranges to Cape Riche, in company with George Maxwell. This expedition would result in much of Drummond's renowned "Fourth Collection", including the celebrated Hakea victoria. On returning home, Drummond sent a report of his explorations to The Inquirer, which published it on 14 April. In it, Drummond states "On Mount Barren I found... a remarkable nodding yellow-flowered Banksia, with leaves and a habit so like B. Caleyii, that it can only be distinguished by the cones and flowers, which are widely different." This is now recognised as a reference to B. lemanniana.

The name Banksia lemanniana first appeared in print in 1852, being included in "A List of the Proteaceae Collected in South-Western Australia by Mr James Drummond", written by Carl Meissner and published in Hooker's Journal of Botany and Kew Garden Miscellany. Four years later, Meissner published a formal species description in his chapter on the Proteaceae for A. P. de Candolle's Prodromus Systematis Naturalis Regni Vegetabilis. Neither of Meissner's publications gives an etymology for the specific epithet, but it is now accepted as honouring the English botanist Charles Morgan Lemann. It has sometimes been misspelt "lehmanniana" after being mistakenly attributed to the German botanist Johann Lehmann. Common names include yellow lantern banksia and Lemann's banksia.

Meissner placed B. lemanniana in series Quercinae in his 1856 arrangement of the genus on account of its strongly dentate, cuneate to obovate leaves. As they were defined on leaf characters alone, all of Meissner's series were highly heterogeneous. George Bentham published a thorough revision of Banksia in his landmark publication Flora Australiensis in 1870. In Bentham's arrangement, the number of recognised Banksia species was reduced from 60 to 46. Bentham defined four sections based on leaf, style and pollen-presenter characters. Banksia lemanniana was placed in section Orthostylis. In 1891, Otto Kuntze, in his Revisio Generum Plantarum, rejected the generic name Banksia L.f., on the grounds that the name Banksia had previously been published in 1776 as Banksia J.R.Forst & G.Forst, referring to the genus now known as Pimelea. Kuntze proposed Sirmuellera as an alternative, referring to this species as Sirmuellera lemanniana. This application of the principle of priority was largely ignored by Kuntze's contemporaries, and Banksia L.f. was formally conserved and Sirmuellera rejected in 1940.

In his 1981 monograph The genus Banksia L.f. (Proteaceae), Alex George placed B. lemanniana in B. subg. Banksia because its inflorescence is a typical Banksia flower spike; in B. sect. Banksia because of its straight styles. He made it the type species of B. ser. Tetragonae, the members of which are defined by their pendulous inflorescences and tetragonal limbs. He considered it closely related to B. aculeata and B. caleyi, which are smaller, more compact, shrubs with red- or pink-tinged inflorescences.

In 1996, Kevin Thiele and Pauline Ladiges published the results of a cladistic analysis of morphological characters of Banksia. They retained George's subgenera and many of his series, but discarded his sections. George's B. ser. Tetragonae was found to be monophyletic, and therefore retained; and their analysis of the relationships within the series supported the placement of B. lemanniana as sister to the pair of species B. aculeata and B. caleyi.

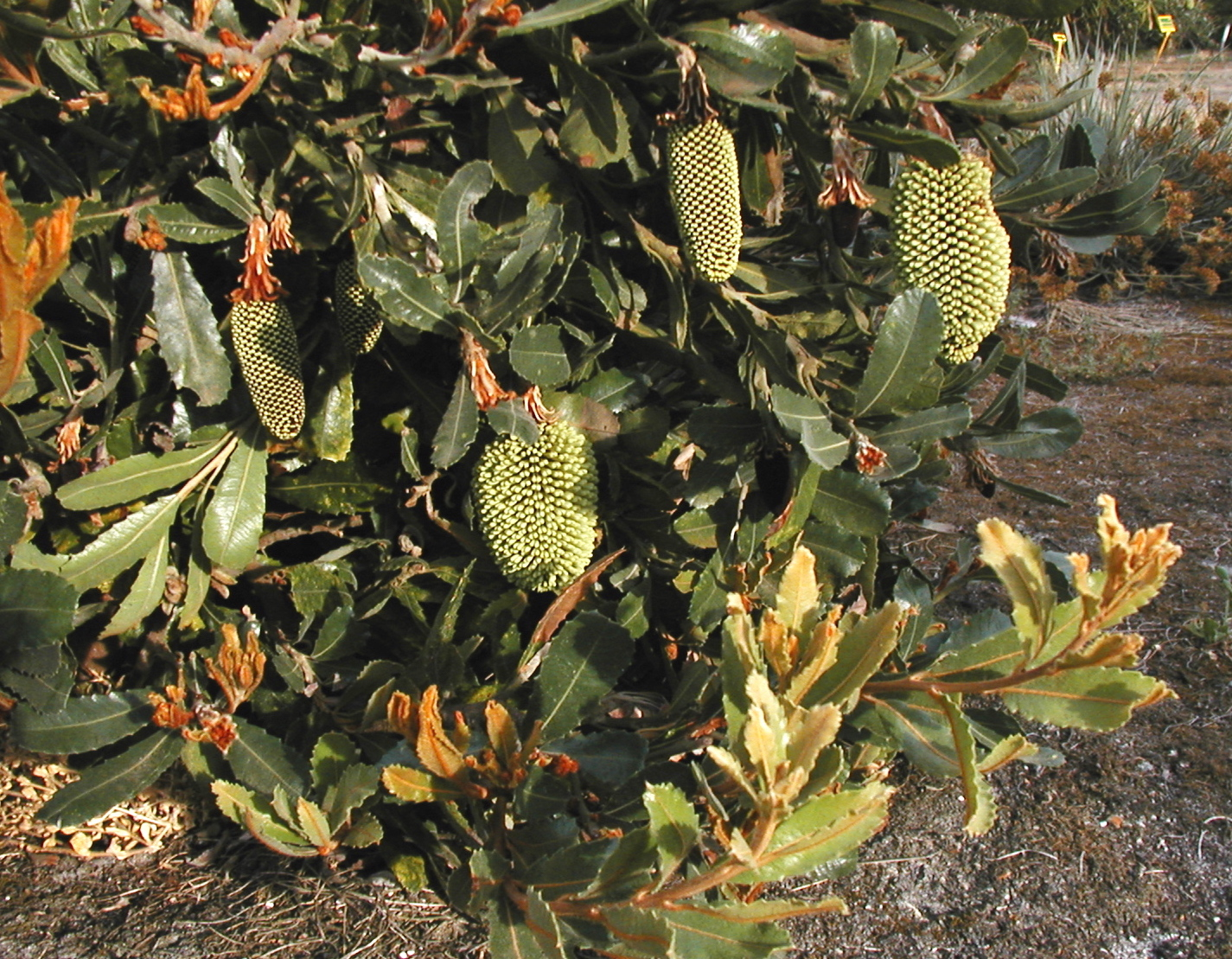
Flowers in late bud and colourful new growth

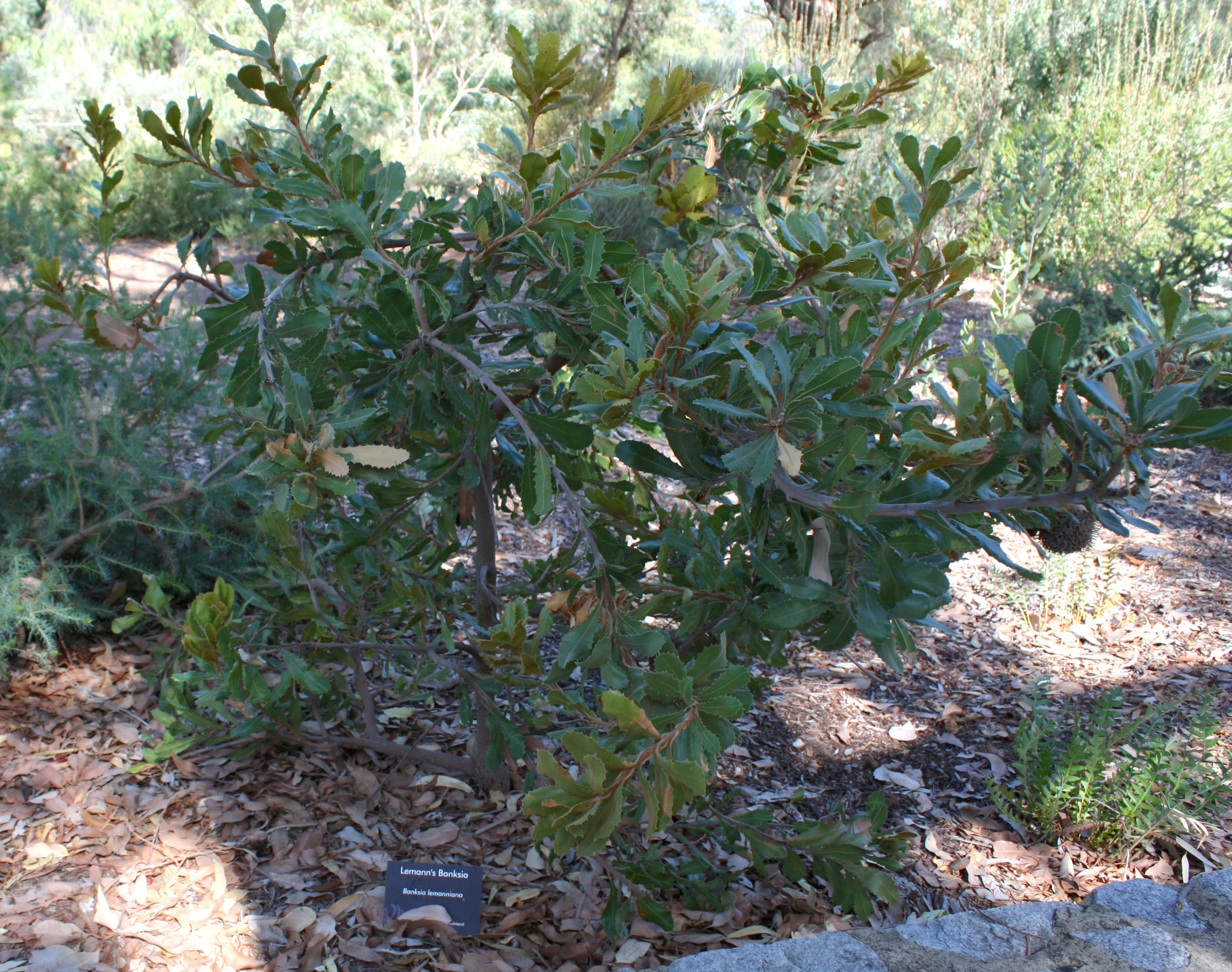
Shrub in cultivation, Western Australian Botanic Garden

B. lemanniana's placement in Thiele and Ladiges' arrangement may be summarised as follows:

Banksia

B. subg. Isostylis (3 species)
B. elegans (incertae sedis)
B. subg. Banksia

B. ser. Tetragonae

B. elderiana
B. lemanniana
B. caleyi
B. aculeata

The arrangement of Thiele and Ladiges was not accepted by George, and was discarded in his 1999 revision. Under George's 1999 arrangement, B. aculeata's placement was as follows:

Banksia

B. subg. Banksia

B. sect. Banksia

B. ser. Salicinae (11 species, 7 subspecies)
B. ser. Grandes (2 species)
B. ser. Banksia (8 species)
B. ser. Crocinae (4 species)
B. ser. Prostratae (6 species, 3 varieties)
B. ser. Cyrtostylis (13 species)
B. ser. Tetragonae

B. lemanniana
B. caleyi
B. aculeata

Since 1998, Austin Mast has been publishing results of ongoing cladistic analyses of DNA sequence data for the subtribe Banksiinae. His analyses suggest a phylogeny that is rather different from previous taxonomic arrangements, but support the placement of the three species in a clade corresponding closely with B. ser. Tetragonae.

Early in 2007 Mast and Thiele initiated a rearrangement by transferring Dryandra to Banksia, and publishing B. subg. Spathulatae for the species having spoon-shaped cotyledons; in this way they also redefined the autonym B. subg. Banksia. They foreshadowed publishing a full arrangement once DNA sampling of Dryandra was complete; in the meantime, if Mast and Thiele's nomenclatural changes are taken as an interim arrangement, then B. lemanniana is placed in B. subg. Banksia.

== Distribution and habitat ==
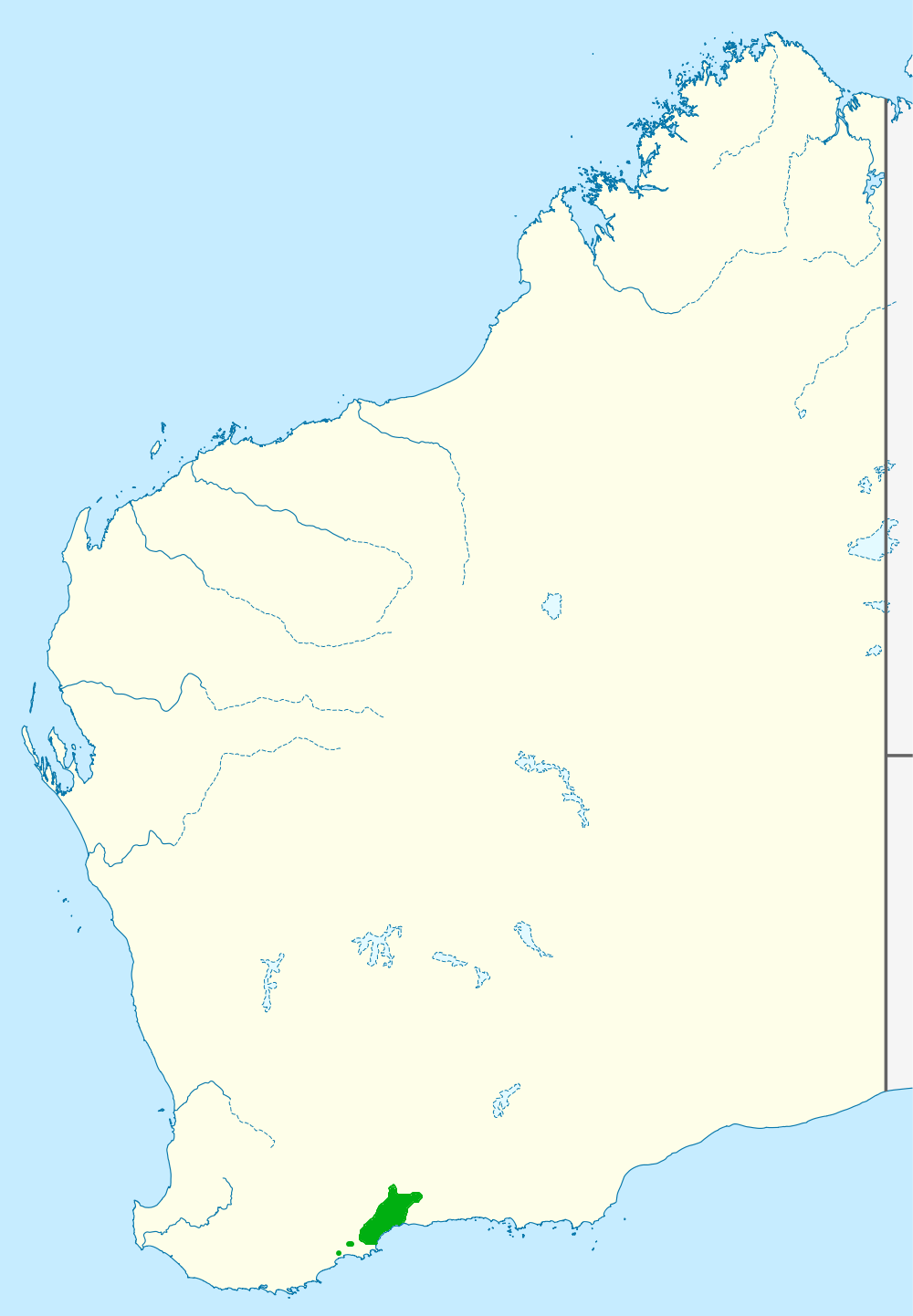
Distribution in southern Western Australia

Banksia lemanniana is found near the southern coast of Western Australia, most of its population protected within Fitzgerald River National Park. Outside the park, it reaches the Ravensthorpe Range to the northeast and the rabbit-proof fence to the east, as well as isolated populations westwards as far as Pallinup estuary. The annual rainfall is 500–600 mm (20–24 in). It is found on the tops and slopes of hills as well as flatter areas on rocky or lateritic soil, as well as sand, in mallee scrubland or heath. Banksia lemanniana is relatively secure as much of its range lies within a National Park, and it is not a species collected for the cut flower industry. It is hence classified as Not Threatened under the Wildlife Conservation Act of Western Australia.

== Ecology ==
A variety of pollinators have been recorded visiting the flower spikes, including New Holland honeyeater (Phylidonyris novaehollandiae), red wattlebird (Anthochaera carunculata), native and European honey bees, wasps and ants. The flower spikes drip nectar onto the ground or lower leaves, suggesting pollination by nonflying mammals, which are attracted to the scent. Being upside down may facilitate this process.

Banksia lemanniana is killed by bushfire and regenerates from seed. It is unclear how quickly seedlings take to reach flowering in the wild, but cultivated records suggest around five or six years. If fire occurs too frequently, plants are burned before reaching maturity or before they have produced sufficient seed to ensure regeneration of the population. This may cause a population decline or even local extinction. Too long a time between fires also causes population decline, as more plants die of natural attrition without releasing their seed, resulting in seed wastage.

Banksia lemanniana has been shown to have a low to moderate susceptibility to dieback from the soil-borne water mould Phytophthora cinnamomi, unlike many Western Australian banksias. A study on cultivated plants in South Australia inoculated with P. cinnamomi and P. citricola found B. lemanniana to have an overall low susceptibility overall to both organisms, although 2-to-3-week-old seedlings appeared more vulnerable than 10-month-old ones.

== Cultivation ==
One of the easier Western species to grow, Banksia lemanniana has some horticultural potential in its attractive chocolate buds, green-yellow hanging flower spikes and large grey spikes with prominent follicles. It generally grows quite quickly, but nevertheless takes five to six years to flower from seed. It prefers a more alkaline rocky or sandy soil, with a nominal pH range from 6 to 7.5. It favours a sunny position and good drainage, and has been successfully cultivated in more humid climates on Australia's east coast. Seeds do not require any treatment, and take 27 to 43 days to germinate.
