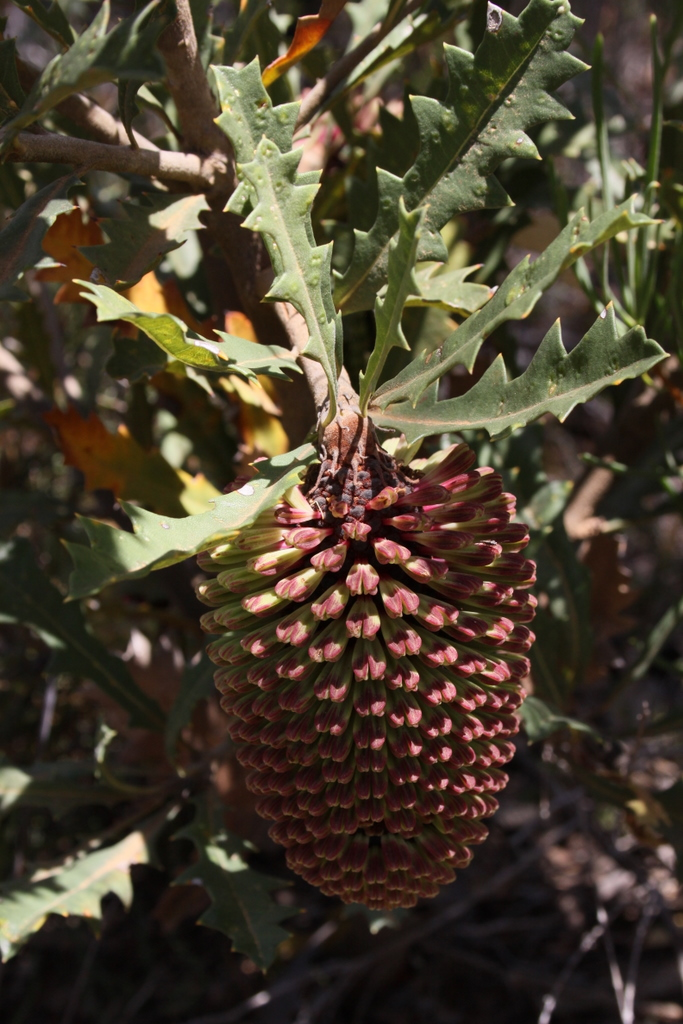

Conservation status
- Priority Two — Poorly Known Taxa (DEC)

Scientific classification
- Kingdom: Plantae
- Clade: Tracheophytes
- Clade: Angiosperms
- Clade: Eudicots
- Order: Proteales
- Family: Proteaceae
- Genus: Banksia
- Species: B. aculeata

Binomial name
- Banksia aculeata A.S.George

= Banksia aculeata =

Species of shrub native to Western Australia

Banksia aculeata, commonly known as prickly banksia, is a species of plant of the family Proteaceae native to the Stirling Range in the southwest of Western Australia. A shrub up to 2 m (7 ft) tall, it has dense foliage and leaves with very prickly serrated margins. Its unusual pinkish, pendent (hanging) flower spikes, known as inflorescences, are generally hidden in the foliage and appear during the early summer. Although it was collected by the naturalist James Drummond in the 1840s, Banksia aculeata was not formally described until 1981, by Alex George in his monograph of the genus.

A rare plant, Banksia aculeata is found in gravelly soils in elevated areas. Native to a habitat burnt by periodic bushfires, it is killed by fire and regenerates from seed afterwards. In contrast to other Western Australian banksias, it appears to have some resistance to the soil-borne water mould Phytophthora cinnamomi.

== Description ==
A bushy shrub, Banksia aculeata grows up to 2 m (7 ft) tall, with fissured grey bark on its trunk and branches. Unlike many other banksia species, it does not have a woody base, or lignotuber. The leaves range from 4–9 cm (1 1/2–3 1/2 in) long and 0.8–3 cm (1/4–1 1/4 in) wide, with sharply pointed rigid lobes on the margins. Appearing in February and March, the cylindrical flower spikes—known as inflorescences—range from 6–9 cm (2 1/4–3 1/2 in) long, growing at the ends of short leafy 2–3-year-old side branches. Hanging downward rather than growing upright like those of most other banksias, they are composed of a central woody spike or axis, from which many compact individual flowers arise perpendicularly. These floral units are made up of a smooth tubular perianth that envelops the flower's sexual organs. The perianth is 3.0–4.3 cm (1 1/4–1 3/4 in) long and pink at the base grading into cream. In late bud, the end of the perianth has a characteristic four-angled (squarish) appearance. It then splits at anthesis to reveal the smooth straight pistil, which is slightly shorter than its enveloping structure at 3.0–4.2 cm (1 1/4–1 3/4 in) long. The fruiting cone, known as an infructescence, is a swollen woody spike in which up to 20 massive follicles are embedded; the withered flower parts persist on the spike, giving it a hairy appearance. Oval in shape, the follicles are wrinkled in texture and covered with fine hair. They are 3.0–4.5 cm (1 1/4–1 3/4 in) long, 2.5–3.0 cm (1–1 1/4 in) high, and 2.0–2.5 cm (3/4–1 in) wide.

The obovate (egg-shaped) seed is 4–5 cm (1 5/8–2 in) long and fairly flattened. It is composed of the wedge-shaped seed body (containing the embryonic plant), measuring 1.0–1.2 cm (3/8–1/2 in) long by 1.5–1.8 cm (5/8–3/4 in) wide, and a papery wing. One side, termed the outer surface, is grey and wrinkled and the other is black and sparkles slightly. The seeds are separated by a sturdy dark brown seed separator that is roughly the same shape as the seeds with a depression where the seed body sits adjacent to it in the follicle. Known as cotyledons, the first pair of leaves produced by seedlings are cuneate (wedge-shaped) and measure 1.1–1.2 cm (3/8–1/2 in) long by 1.9 cm (3/4 in) wide. They are dull dark green, sometimes with a reddish tinge, and the margin of the wedge is convex. The auricle at the base of the cotyledon leaf is pointed and measures 0.3 cm (1/8 in) long. The hypocotyl is thick, smooth and dark red. The obovate to oblong seedling leaves are 4–9 cm (1 1/2–3 1/2 in) long by 2.0–2.5 cm (3/4–1 in) wide with serrated margins, v-shaped sinuses and sharp teeth.

The related Banksia caleyi is similar in appearance but can be distinguished by its recurved (downward curving) leaf margins, and smaller follicles and perianths. Its flowers appear from October to December.

== Taxonomy ==
Banksia aculeata was first collected by James Drummond on one of his three trips to the Stirling Range between 1843 and 1848, though he did not regard it as distinct from B. caleyi—this was only recognised over a century later by Alex George. George described B. aculeata in his 1981 monograph "The genus Banksia L.f. (Proteaceae)". For the type of the species, George selected a specimen he collected on Chester Pass Road in the Stirling Range east of Cranbrook on 20 March 1972. He gave it the specific epithet aculeata (Latin for "sharp"), in reference to the sharply pointed leaf lobes.

George placed B. aculeata in B. subg. Banksia because its inflorescence is a typical Banksia flower spike; in B. sect. Banksia because of its straight styles; and B. ser. Tetragonae because of its pendulous inflorescences. He considered its closest relative to be B. caleyi, from which it differs in having narrower leaves with fewer, larger lobes; longer perianths, which grade from red to cream rather than from cream to red; shorter pistils; and also differences in the follicles, seeds and flowering time.

In 1996, Kevin Thiele and Pauline Ladiges published the results of a cladistic analysis of morphological characters of Banksia. They retained George's subgenera and many of his series, but discarded his sections. George's B. ser. Tetragonae was found to be monophyletic, and therefore retained; and their analysis of the relationships within the series supported the placement of B. aculeata alongside B. caleyi.

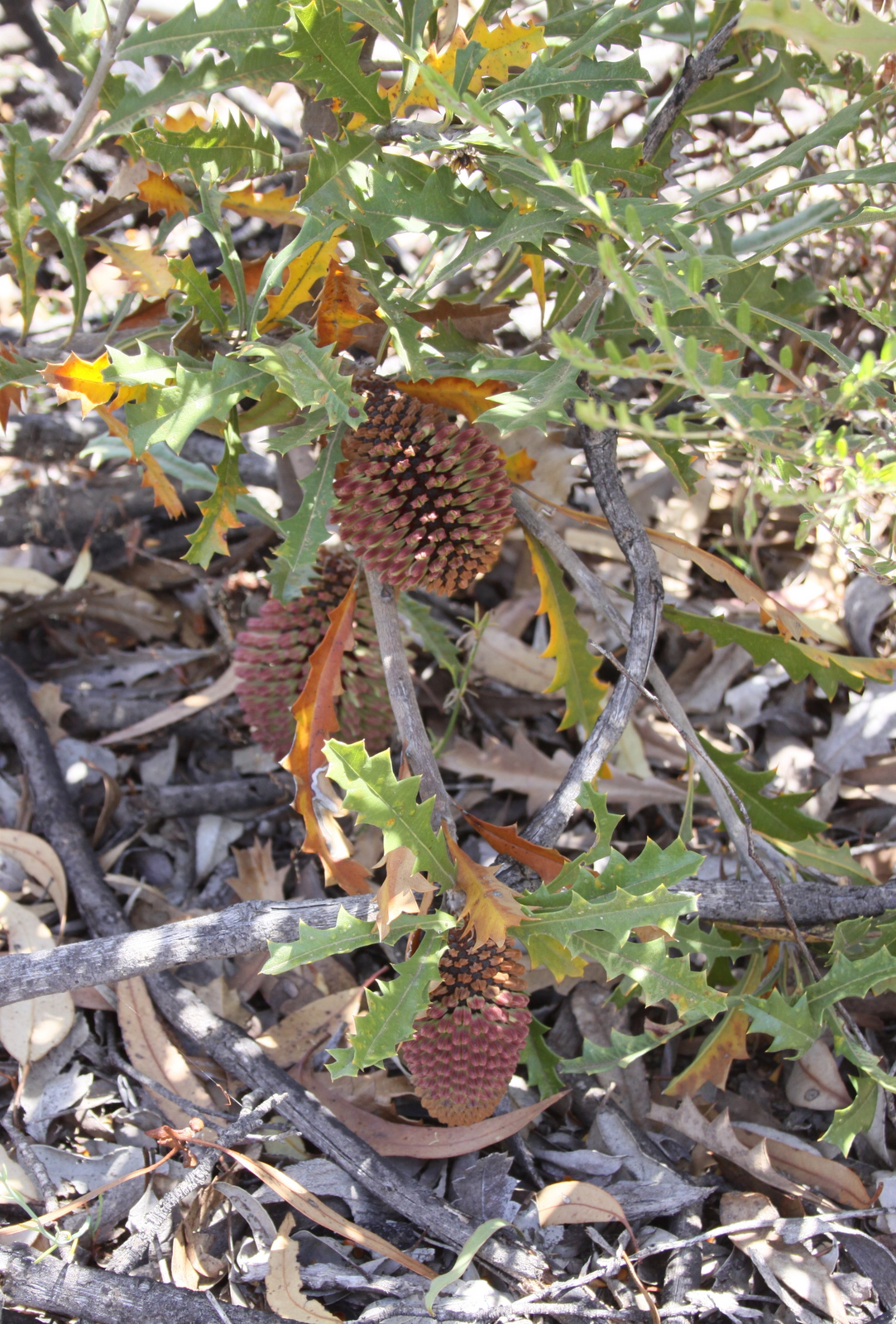
Flower spikes in early bud stage

B. aculeata's placement in Thiele and Ladiges' arrangement may be summarised as follows:

Banksia

B. subg. Isostylis (3 species)
B. elegans (incertae sedis)
B. subg. Banksia

B. ser. Tetragonae

B. elderiana
B. lemanniana
B. caleyi
B. aculeata

The arrangement of Thiele and Ladiges was not accepted by George and was discarded in his 1999 revision. Under George's 1999 arrangement, B. aculeata's placement was as follows:

Banksia

B. subg. Banksia

B. sect. Banksia

B. ser. Salicinae (11 species, 7 subspecies)
B. ser. Grandes (2 species)
B. ser. Banksia (8 species)
B. ser. Crocinae (4 species)
B. ser. Prostratae (6 species, 3 varieties)
B. ser. Cyrtostylis (13 species)
B. ser. Tetragonae

B. lemanniana
B. caleyi
B. aculeata

Since 1998, Austin Mast has been publishing results of ongoing cladistic analyses of DNA sequence data for the subtribe Banksiinae. His analyses suggest a phylogeny that is rather different from previous taxonomic arrangements, but support the placement of B. aculeata alongside B. caleyi in a clade corresponding closely with B. ser. Tetragonae. A 2013 molecular study by Marcel Cardillo and colleagues using chloroplast DNA and combining it with earlier results found that B. aculeata was sister to B. lemanniana and that B. caleyi was the next closest relative.

Early in 2007 Mast and Thiele initiated a rearrangement by transferring Dryandra to Banksia, and publishing B. subg. Spathulatae for the species having spoon-shaped cotyledons; in this way they also redefined the autonym B. subg. Banksia. They foreshadowed publishing a full arrangement once DNA sampling of Dryandra was complete; in the meantime, if Mast and Thiele's nomenclatural changes are taken as an interim arrangement, then B. aculeata is placed in B. subg. Banksia.

== Distribution and habitat ==
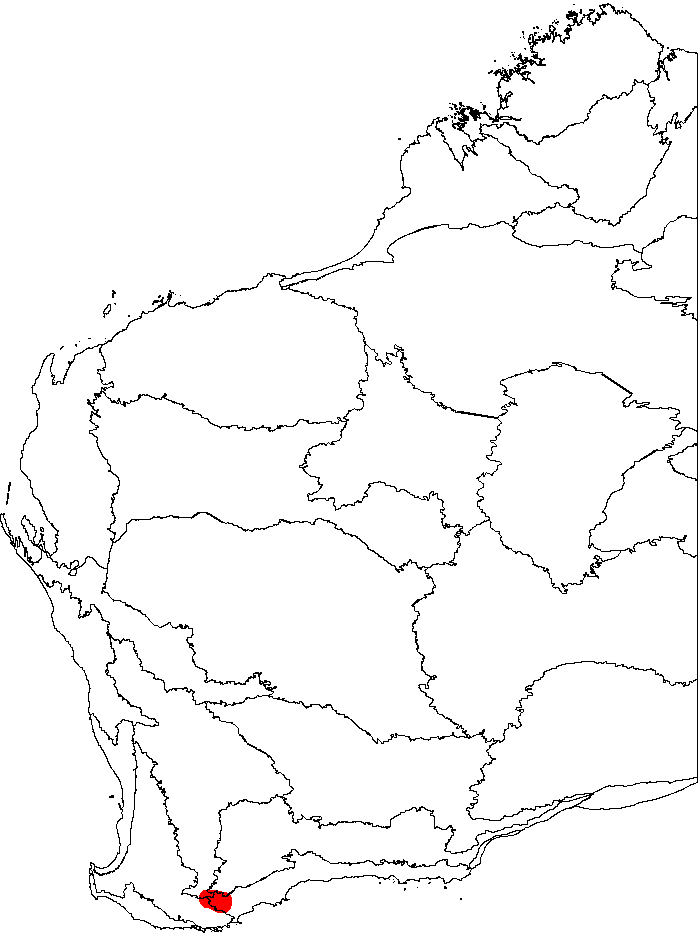
Distribution within Western Australia

B. aculeata is native to the foothills of the Stirling Range in the southwest of Western Australia, occurring at elevations between 250 and 500 m (825 and 1,650 ft), in shrubland in gravelly, clayish soils. The annual rainfall is around 600 mm (24 in). It is a fairly rare plant, with most populations consisting of fewer than 100 plants. With fairly small populations and a narrow distribution, B. aculeata is considered rare, but is not currently classed as endangered because at least some populations are thought not to be under immediate threat. The Department of Environment and Conservation of the Western Australian State Government classes it as "Priority Two – Poorly Known" flora.

== Ecology ==
Like many plants in Australia's southwest, Banksia aculeata is adapted to an environment in which bushfire events are relatively frequent. Most Banksia species can be placed in one of two broad groups according to their response to fire: reseeders are killed by fire, but fire also triggers the release of their canopy seed bank, thus promoting recruitment of the next generation; resprouters survive fire, resprouting from a lignotuber or, more rarely, epicormic buds protected by thick bark. B. aculeata is killed by fire because it possesses neither thick protective bark nor a lignotuber to reshoot from. It is serotinous—it accumulates a canopy seed bank that is released only in response to fire—so populations typically recover rapidly after a fire, but this strategy makes it dependent on a suitable fire regime. Plants take three to four years to reach flowering after a bushfire.

Pollinators have not been observed, and the flowering period is brief when compared with other banksias. However, the flowers appear when little else is in bloom, rendering it a valuable food source for animals.

B. aculeata has been reported as susceptible to dieback from the soil-borne water mould Phytophthora cinnamomi, but in a 2008 study this pathogen was found to have no direct impact on the species. As a result of this finding, together with the low percentage of populations infested or facing imminent infestation, the species was classed as having a very low extinction risk.

== Cultivation ==
Banksia aculeata grows slowly, generally taking five to six years to flower from seed, though there is a report of it flowering in three years at Strathmerton in Victoria. Regarding its potential as an ornamental plant, Alex George observes that the flowers are brightly coloured but have a short life and are obscured by the foliage, which is quite prickly. He nonetheless considers both the new foliage and the infructescence attractive. This species can grow in a range of soil types so long as they provide good drainage. The nominal soil pH range is from 5.5 to 6.5. It prefers full sun, although it will grow in partly shaded situations, producing fewer flowers. It will tolerate light pruning.
