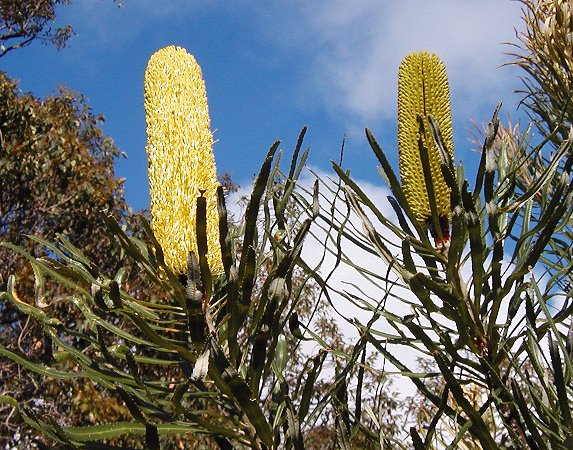
- At Margaret River

Conservation status
- Vulnerable (IUCN 3.1)

Scientific classification
- Kingdom: Plantae
- Clade: Embryophytes
- Clade: Tracheophytes
- Clade: Spermatophytes
- Clade: Angiosperms
- Clade: Eudicots
- Order: Proteales
- Family: Proteaceae
- Genus: Banksia
- Species: B. attenuata

Binomial name
- Banksia attenuata R.Br.
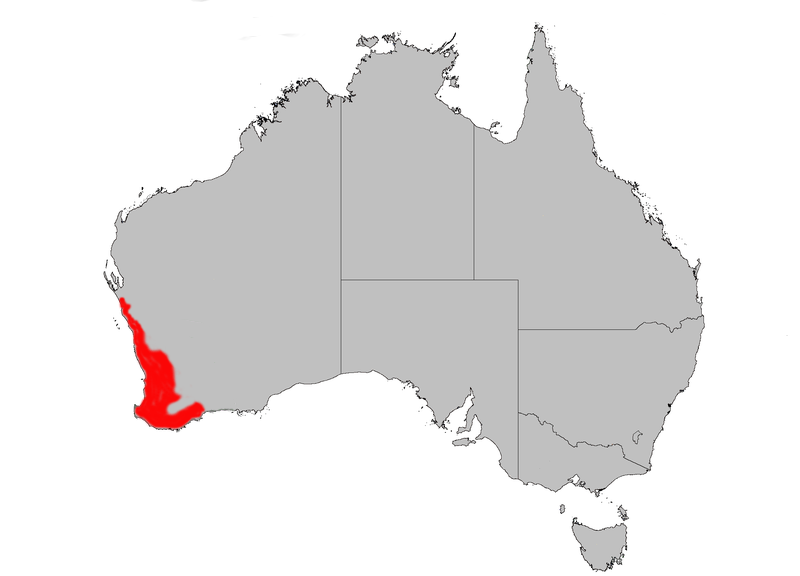
- Distribution of Banksia attenuata

Synonyms
- Banksia cylindrostachya Lindl.; Sirmuellera attenuata (R.Br.) Kuntze

= Banksia attenuata =

Candlestick banksia or biara

Species of plant

Banksia attenuata, commonly known as the candlestick banksia, slender banksia, or biara to the Noongar people, is a species of plant in the family Proteaceae. Commonly a tree, it reaches 10 m (33 ft) high, but it is often a shrub in drier areas 0.4 to 2 m (1.3 to 6.6 ft) high. It has long, narrow, serrated leaves and bright yellow inflorescences, or flower spikes, held above the foliage, which appear in spring and summer. The flower spikes age to grey and swell with the development of the woody follicles. The candlestick banksia is found across much of the southwest of Western Australia, from north of Kalbarri National Park down to Cape Leeuwin and across to Fitzgerald River National Park.

English botanist John Lindley had named material collected by Australian botanist James Drummond Banksia cylindrostachya in 1840, but this proved to be the same as the species named Banksia attenuata by Scottish botanist Robert Brown 30 years earlier in 1810, and thus Brown's name took precedence. Within the genus Banksia, the close relationships and exact position of B. attenuata is unclear.

The candlestick banksia is pollinated by and provides food for a wide array of animals in summer months. Several species of honeyeater visit the flower spikes, as does the honey possum, which has an important role as a pollinator. It regenerates from bushfire by regrowing from its woody base, known as a lignotuber, or from epicormic buds within its trunk. It can have a lifespan of 300 years. It has been widely used as a street tree and for amenities planting in urban Western Australia, though its large size generally precludes use in small gardens. A dwarf form is commercially available in nurseries.

== Description ==
Banksia attenuata is generally encountered as a tree up to 10 m (30 ft) tall. In the north of its range as the climate becomes warmer and drier, it is often a stunted multistemmed shrub 0.4 to 2 m (1.3 to 6.6 ft) tall. Both forms occur in the vicinity of Hill River but there is otherwise a marked demarcation.

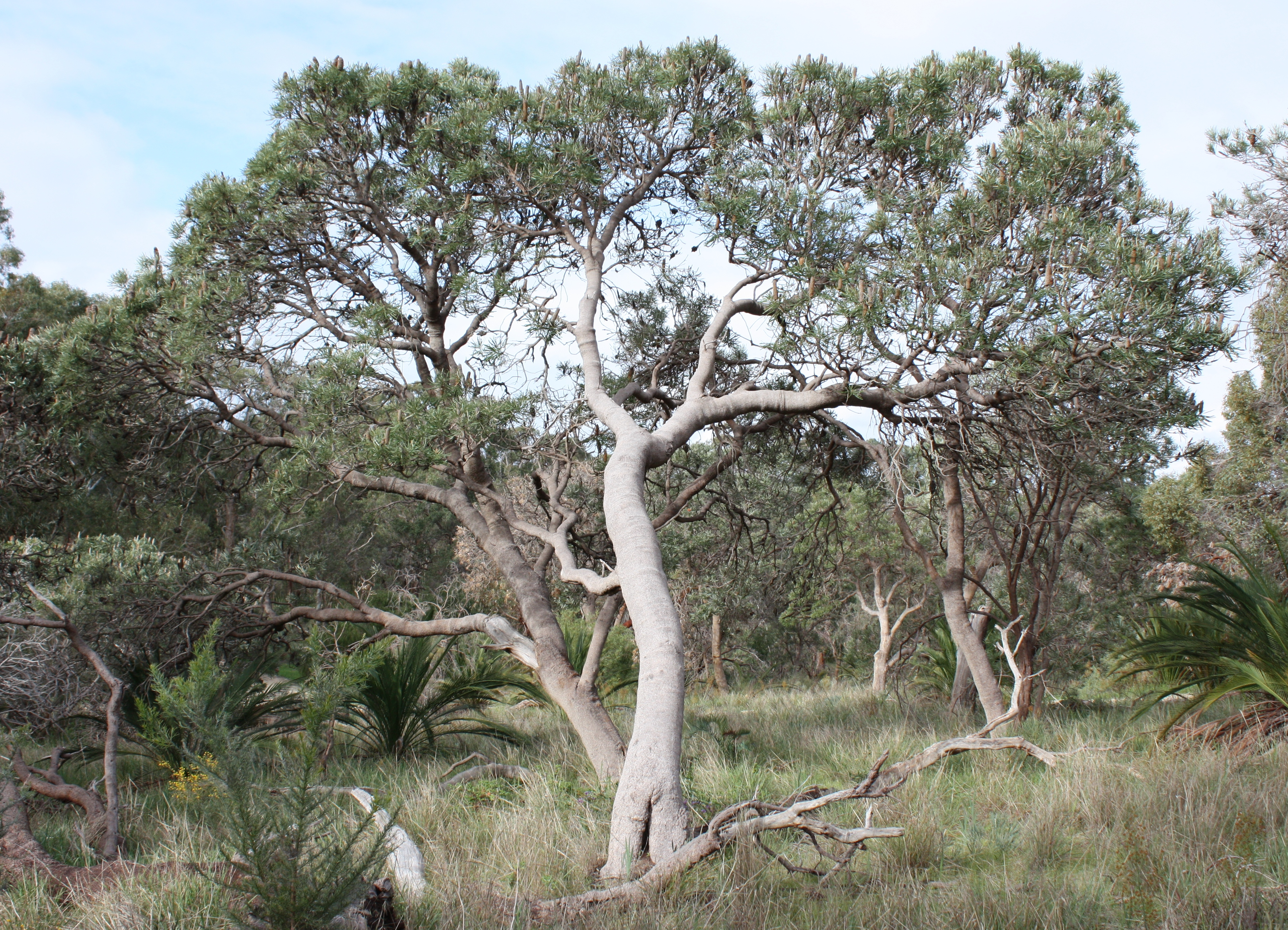
A large tree in Bold Park, Perth. The trunk is characteristically wavy or bent.

In the Wheatbelt and east of the Stirling Range, it is a stunted tree. Tree forms have a solid trunk, generally wavy or bent, with 1–2 cm (0.4–0.8 in) thick crumbly orange-grey bark which is a red-brown underneath. It regenerates from fire via lignotuber or epicormic buds from its fire-tolerant trunk. It has long narrow shiny green linear leaves 4 to 27 cm (1.6 to 10.6 in) long and 0.5 to 1.6 cm (0.2 to 0.6 in) wide. The leaf margins have v- or u-shaped serrations along their length. The new growth is a pale grey-green and occurs mainly in the late spring and summer, often after flowering. The brilliant yellow inflorescences (flower spikes) occur from spring into summer and are up 5 cm (2.0 in) wide and up to 25–30 cm (9.8–11.8 in) tall. They are made up of many small individual flowers; a study at Mount Adams 330 km (210 mi) north of Perth revealed a count of 1933 (± a standard error of 88) flowers per inflorescence, and another in the Fitzgerald River National Park yielded a count of 1720 (± 76) flowers. Anthesis proceeds up the flower spike over about 10 to 20 days and is asynchronous. That is, a plant produces flower spikes over a several-week period and will thus have spikes at different stages of development over the flowering season.

Often bright green in bud stage, they are terminal, occurring at the ends of one- to three-year-old branches, and displayed prominently above the foliage. The smell of the open flowers has been likened to a peppery Shiraz wine. Over time, the spikes fade to brown and then grey, and the individual flowers shrivel and lie against the spikes. This coincides with the development of dark furry oval follicles, which measure 2–3.5 cm (0.8–1.4 in) long, 1–1.5 cm (0.4–0.6 in) high, and 1.4–2 cm (0.6–0.8 in) wide. However, only a very small percentage (0.1%) of flowers develop into follicles; the field study at Mount Adams yielded a count of 3.6 ± 1.2 per cone. The follicles develop and mature over seven to eight months, from February to December, while seed development occurs over four months from September to December.

== Taxonomy ==
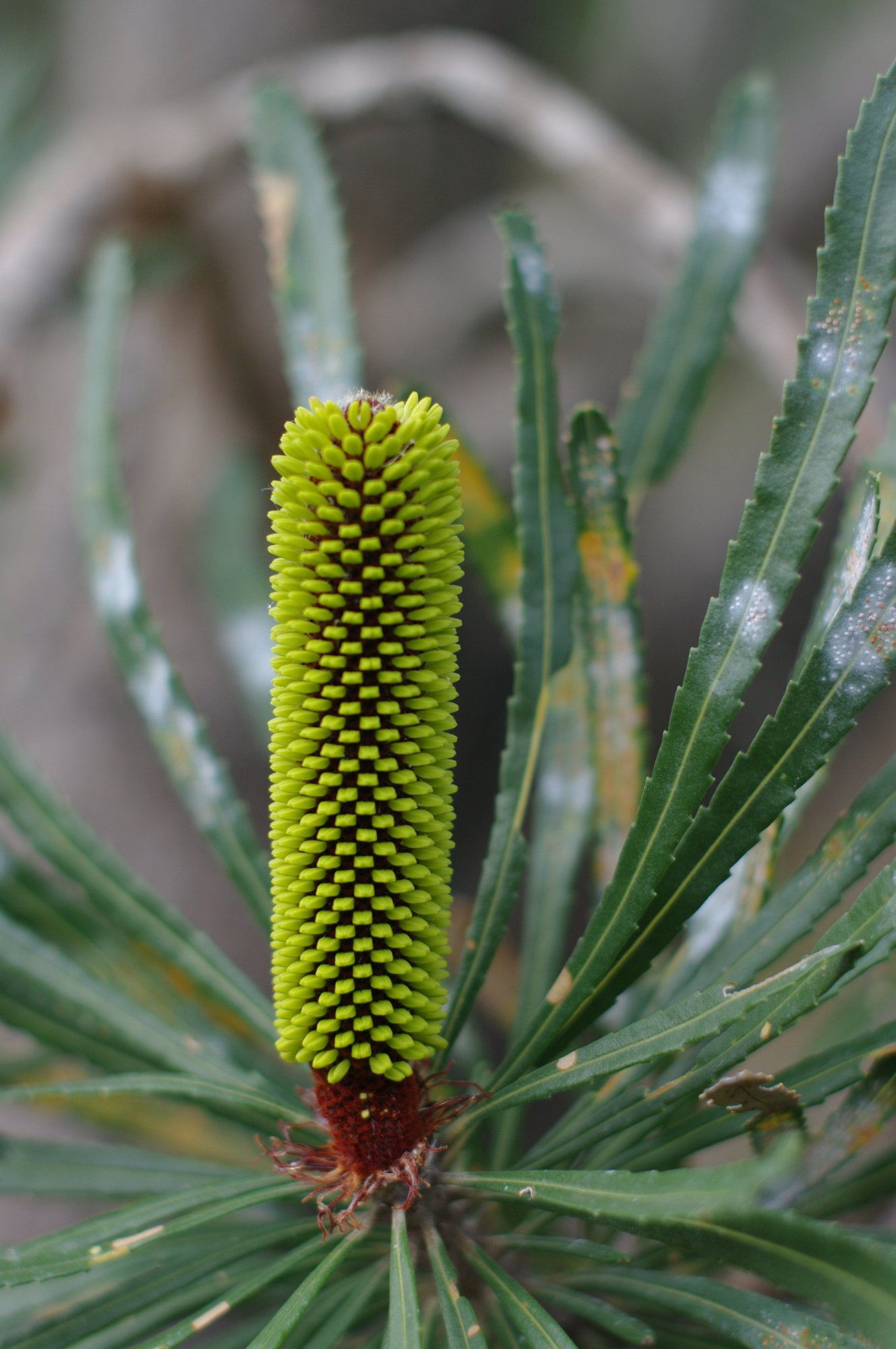
A flower spike in early bud stage

Banksia attenuata was first collected by Robert Brown from King George Sound in December 1801 and published by him in 1810. The specific epithet is the Latin adjective attenuatus 'narrowed', and refers to the leaves narrowing towards the base. The species has had a fairly uneventful taxonomic history. It has only two synonyms, and no subspecies or varieties have been published; Australian botanist Alex George reviewed the variation in form in the species and felt that the tree and shrub forms differed only in size and hence were not distinct enough to represent separate taxa. In 1840, John Lindley published a putative new species, Banksia cylindrostachya, in his A Sketch of the Vegetation of the Swan River Colony; this has now been shown to be a taxonomic synonym of B. attenuata. In 1891, Otto Kuntze rejected the generic name Banksia L.f., on the grounds that the name Banksia had previously been published in 1776 as Banksia J.R.Forst & G.Forst, referring to the genus now known as Pimelea. Kuntze proposed Sirmuellera as an alternative, referring to this species as Sirmuellera attenuata. This application of the principle of priority was largely ignored by Kuntze's contemporaries, and Banksia L.f. was formally conserved and Sirmuellera rejected in 1940. Common names include slender banksia, candle banksia, and candlestick banksia. Piara (alternately spelled biara) is an aboriginal name from the Melville region of Perth.

The relationships of Banksia attenuata within the genus are unclear. When Carl Meissner published his infrageneric arrangement of Banksia in 1856, he placed B. attenuata in section Eubanksia because its inflorescence is a spike rather than a domed head, and in series Salicinae, a large series that is now considered quite heterogeneous. This series was discarded in the 1870 arrangement of George Bentham; instead, B. attenuata was placed in section Cyrtostylis, a group of species that did not fit easily into one of the other sections.

In 1981, George published a revised arrangement that placed B. attenuata in the subgenus Banksia because of its flower spike, section Banksia because its styles are straight rather than hooked, and the series Cyrtostylis, a large and rather heterogenous series of twelve species. He conceded its large emarginate cotyledons (having a notch in their apex) were quite different from other members, and that it had similarities in flower architecture to another anomalous member B. elegans. He felt B. attenuata to have affinities to B. lindleyana and B. media.

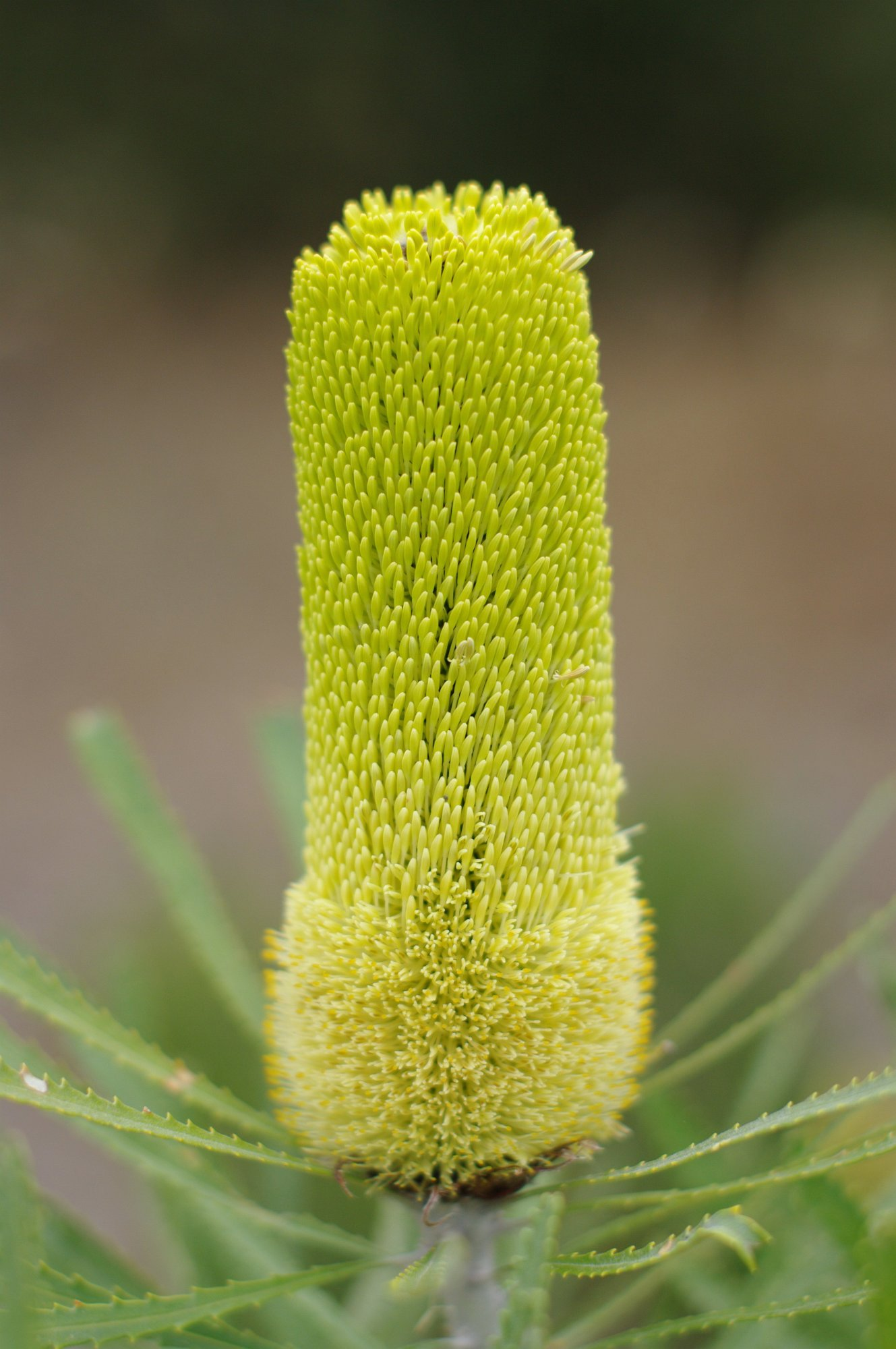
An inflorescence halfway through anthesis as the flowers open upwards up the spike

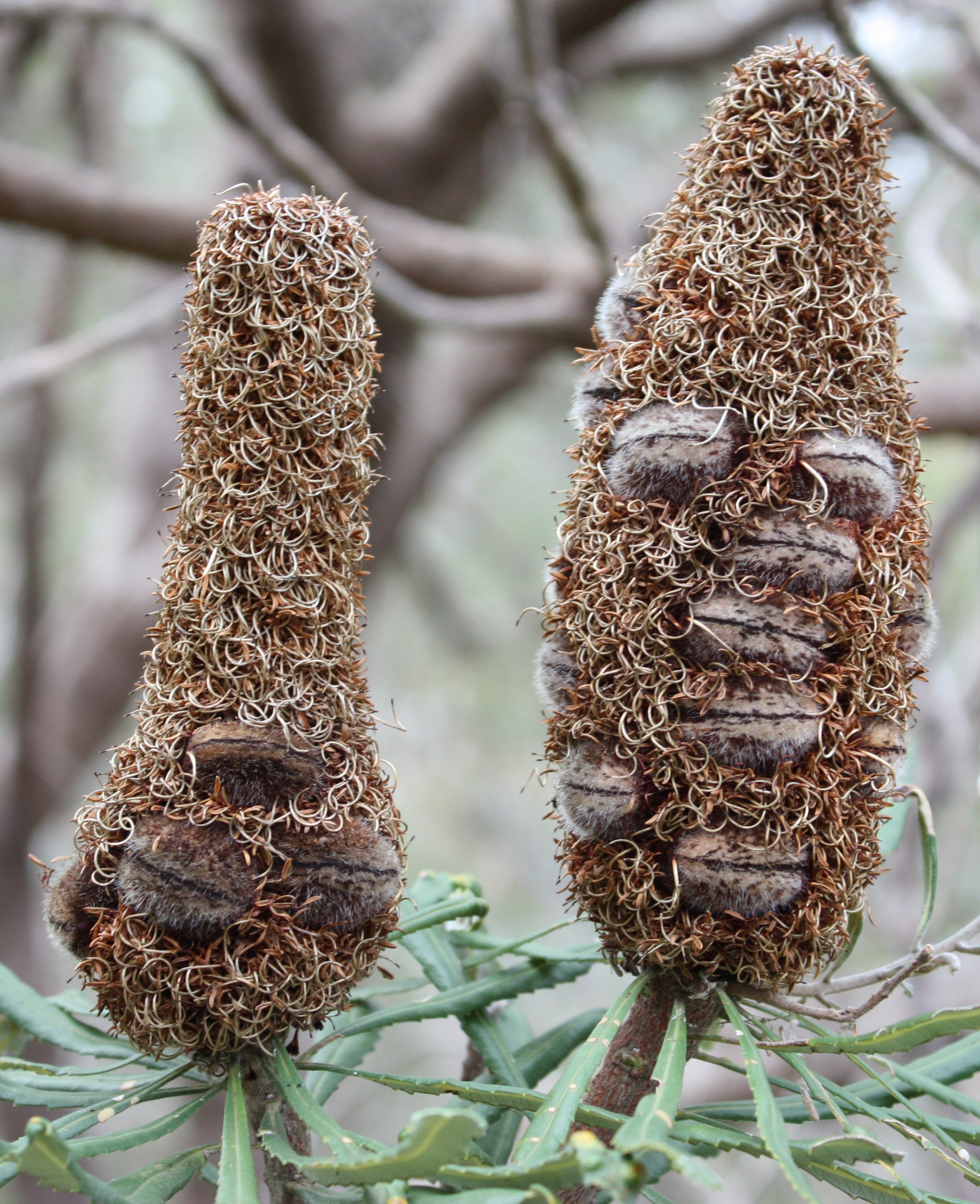
The ageing flowers remain curled against the spike, as the furry follicles develop.

George's arrangement remained current until 1996, when Kevin Thiele and Pauline Ladiges published an arrangement informed by a cladistic analysis of morphological characteristics. They calculated B. attenuata to lie at the base of a large B. attenuata – B. ashbyi clade, but conceded further work was needed before its relationships could be determined, and left it as incertae sedis (i.e. Its exact placement is unclear). Questioning the emphasis on cladistics in Thiele and Ladiges' arrangement, George published a slightly modified version of his 1981 arrangement in his 1999 treatment of Banksia for the Flora of Australia series of monographs. To date, this remains the most recent comprehensive arrangement. The placement of B. attenuata in George's 1999 arrangement may be summarised as follows:

Banksia

B. subg. Banksia

B. sect. Banksia

B. ser. Cyrtostylis

B. media
B. praemorsa
B. epica
B. pilostylis
B. attenuata
B. ashbyi
B. benthamiana
B. audax
B. lullfitzii
B. elderiana
B. laevigata

B. laevigata subsp. laevigata
B. laevigata subsp. fuscolutea

B. elegans
B. lindleyana

Since 1998, American botanist Austin Mast and co-authors have been publishing results of ongoing cladistic analyses of DNA sequence data for the subtribe Banksiinae, which then comprised genera Banksia and Dryandra. Their analyses suggest a phylogeny that differs greatly from George's taxonomic arrangement. Banksia attenuata resolves as a basal member of and next closest relative, or 'sister', to a clade containing B. elegans and, within that, a monophyletic B. subg. Isostylis. An Eocene fossil cone named Banksia archaeocarpa, around 50 million years old, resembles that of B. attenuata.

Early in 2007, Mast and Thiele rearranged the genus Banksia by merging Dryandra into it, and published B. subg. Spathulatae for the taxa having spoon-shaped cotyledons; thus B. subg. Banksia was redefined as encompassing taxa lacking spoon-shaped cotyledons. They foreshadowed publishing a full arrangement once DNA sampling of Dryandra was complete. In the meantime, if Mast and Thiele's nomenclatural changes are taken as an interim arrangement, then B. attenuata is placed in B. subg. Banksia.

== Distribution and habitat ==
The most widely distributed of all western banksias, Banksia attenuata occurs across a broad swathe of southwest of Western Australia, from Kalbarri National Park and the Murchison River (with an outlying population in Zuytdorp Nature Reserve) southwards right to the southwestern corner of the state at Augusta and Cape Leeuwin, and then eastwards across the south to the western edge of Fitzgerald River National Park. Along the eastern border northwards it is found at Lake Grace, Lake Magenta north of Jerramungup, and the Wongan Hills. It is restricted to various sandy soils, including white, yellow, or brown sands, and sand over either laterite or limestone. It forms an important component of open Eucalyptus woodland as a dominant or understory tree or tall shrub. To the north, it is a shrubby component of shrubland. It does not grow on heavy (clay-based) soils, and is hence only found in sandy pockets. Within open woodland, it is found alongside B. menziesii, B. ilicifolia, B. prionotes, Allocasuarina fraseriana, Eucalyptus marginata, or E. gomphocephala. The annual rainfall within its distribution varies from 300 to 900 mm (12 to 35 in).

== Ecology ==
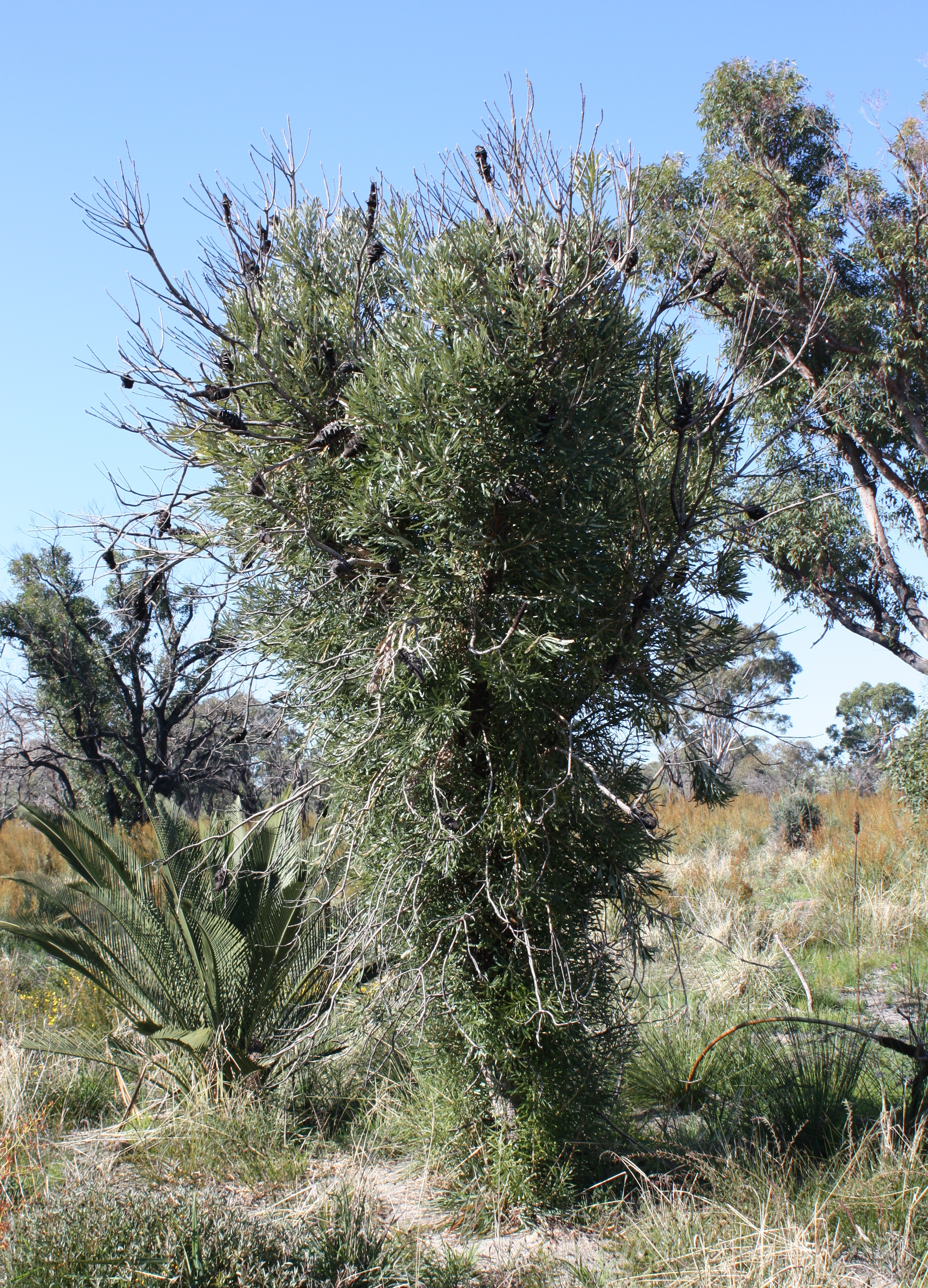
A tree with new growth resprouting from epicormic buds after fire

Like many plants in southwest Western Australia, B. attenuata is adapted to an environment in which bushfire events are relatively frequent. Most Banksia species can be placed in one of two broad groups according to their response to fire: reseeders are killed by fire, but fire also triggers the release of their canopy seed bank, thus promoting recruitment of the next generation; resprouters survive fire, resprouting from a lignotuber or, more rarely, epicormic buds protected by thick bark. Bearing epicormic buds and a lignotuber, B. attenuata is one of the latter group, with follicles that may open spontaneously or by fire.

It is moderately serotinous, storing only one-tenth the number of seeds in its seed bank as the reseeding B. hookeriana with which it coexists on sand dunes in scrub at Eneabba north of Perth. Even then, many of its follicles do not release seed after a fire, but instead after successive autumn rains. An experiment simulating wet weather following a fire saw a series of Banksia attenuata cones with follicles subjected to twice-weekly immersions in water after being heated in a ring Bunsen flame to around 500–600 °C (932–1,112 °F) for two minutes. Cones that had been exposed to water for more weeks had more seed released from follicles over time; around 40% released at three weeks, increasing steadily to almost 90% at ten weeks, compared with a series of controls (which were kept dry) of which fewer than 10% of seed released. Thus, the seed remains in the follicles until successive rains result in seed dispersal in the wetter winter (instead of dryer summer), increasing the chance of survival. After the follicle is split, the seed and separator are exposed to the elements. The wings of the woody separator are hygroscopic, move together when wet, and spread and curl apart when dry. The seed is gradually drawn out by the movement with each wetting.

Once released, seed germinates at temperatures between 15 and 20 °C (59–68 °F) to optimise timing with autumn and winter rains and hence maximise chance of survival. Still, many seedlings die off in the hot and dry summer months. Seedling survival for the species is lower than for banksias which regenerate by seeding over time. Despite this, the longevity of mature plants allows for maintenance of population until favourable years enable better survival of young plants. As they mature, plants are less likely to perish and are estimated to live for 300 years or more. Analyzing the seed bank and longitudinal results over fifteen years on the Eneabba sandplain showed that B. attenuata would become more abundant over time with fire intervals averaging between 6 and 20 years, peaking with intervals around 10 to 12 years, compared with longer intervals for the reseeders B. hookeriana and B. prionotes. Placed against its rivals, B. attenuata would be dominant between 8 and 10 or 11 years, but at longer intervals is outcompeted by B. hookeriana. Variability in the timing between fires allows all three species to coexist. Exaggerated good and bad weather conditions favours B. attenuata over the reseeding species, which suffer more.

Despite having relatively heavy seed, seed from Banksia attenuata has a high rate of long-distance dispersal. A genetic study of populations in Eneabba showed that over 5% of plants had originated up to 2.6 km (1.6 mi) away (similar rates to Banksia hookeriana, the seed of which only weighs half as much). The mechanism for this is unclear, although Byron Lamont has proposed the Carnaby's black cockatoo (Zanda latirostris) as a vector; the species seeks out Banksia attenuata cones after bushfire, possibly because the large seeds and greater chance of grubs in the cone make them more nutritious. Flowering has been recorded one to two years after a bushfire.

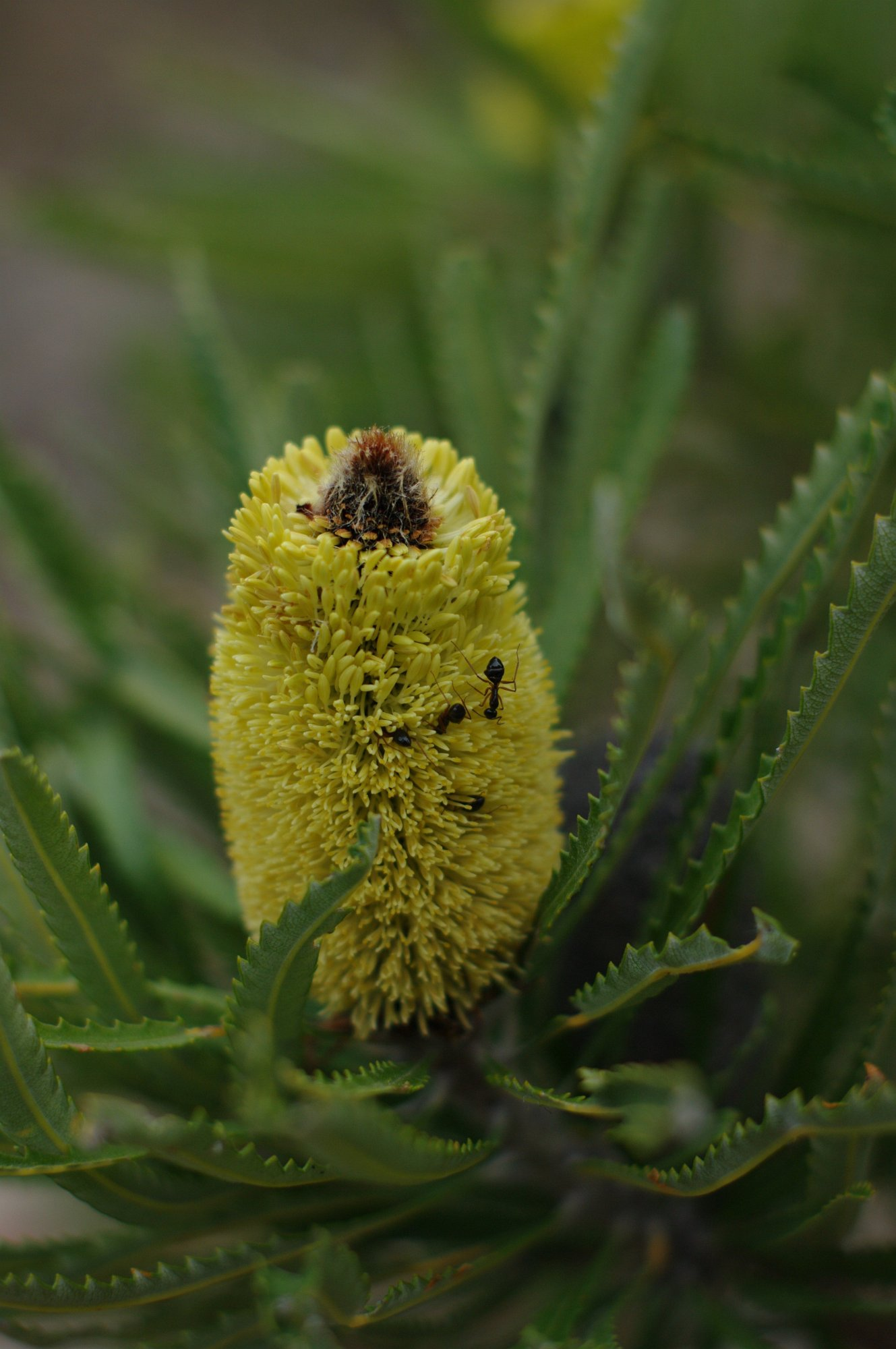
Ants visit a flower spike part way through anthesis. Note that the lower flowers have opened, and the upper ones are still closed.

Like many members of the family Proteaceae, Banksia attenuata is an obligate outcrossing species. Self-incompatible, inflorescences require pollinators to be fertilised and produce seed. A genetic study of seed collected near Jandakot published in 1980 showed obligate outcrossing. A field study in the Fitzgerald River National Park where inflorescences were enclosed in mesh fine enough to keep out vertebrates and invertebrates as small as the honey bee (Apis mellifera) showed that follicles still developed, indicating that small invertebrates were able to cross-pollinate the species. Banksia attenuata flowers are visited by the colletid bee Hylaeus globuliferus and bees of the genus Euhesma. Other pollinating invertebrates recorded include ants and dragonflies. An analysis of the invertebrate population found in the canopy of Banksia woodland found that mites and ticks (acari), beetles (coleoptera) and ants, bees and wasps (hymenoptera) predominated overall, with the three orders also the most common on B. attenuata along with thrips (thysanoptera). Lower overall numbers of invertebrates on Banksia species were thought to be related to the presence of insectivorous birds.

Many bird species were recorded by the national Banksia Atlas survey, including the New Holland honeyeater (Phylidonyris novaehollandiae), brown honeyeater (Lichmera indistincta), singing honeyeater (Gavicalis virescens), western spinebill (Acanthorhynchus superciliosus), twenty-eight parrot (Barnardius zonarius semitorquatus) and red-tailed black cockatoo (Calyptorhynchus banksii). Black cockatoos have been observed feeding upon the seed of B. attenuata, although it is not clear which species of black cockatoo was observed, the short-billed or long-billed black cockatoo (Calyptorhynchus baudinii). At a site near Jandakot, short-billed black cockatoos were observed selecting immature infructescences which bore signs of infestation by the weevil Alphitopis nivea, the larvae of which tunnel in banksia spikes and eat the seed. They extract the larvae and drop the cones.

A 1978 field study conducted around Albany found the honey possum (Tarsipes rostratus) was a major pollinator of Banksia attenuata, both feeding directly on the pollen and drinking the nectar. The flower structure is suited to passing pollen onto the possum as it feeds, unlike honeyeaters whose bills are too long for this to occur readily. Coupled with the flower spike's musky odour, these findings suggest Banksia attenuata is highly adapted to be pollinated primarily by this mammal species. Furthermore, Petroc Sumner and colleagues have investigated the cone photoreceptor cells of honey possums and compared them with the colour changes of B. attenuata. They found that the possum is trichromatic (like humans and possibly many marsupials) and propose that its L (long wavelength) cones help it discern B. attenuata flower spikes, and the M (or medium wavelength) cones could help it distinguish ripe inflorescences with nectar from recently finished spikes (a difficult task for human vision). There is some evidence for other mammals as pollinators; B. attenuata-like pollen was recovered from museum skins of dunnarts (Sminthopsis spp.) and pygmy possums (Cercartetus spp.), and the sugar glider (Petaurus breviceps) visited flower spikes in captivity.

Seventeen species from several orders of slime molds (myxomycetes) have been isolated from the bark of Banksia attenuata. Over half (nine) were from the order Stemonitales, and Echinosteliales and Liceales were also common. The abundance of the first two orders may be due to the acidity of the bark. Another order, the Physarales, was unusually rare—other studies have demonstrated that the order is typically abundant on the bark of various species of tree around the world.

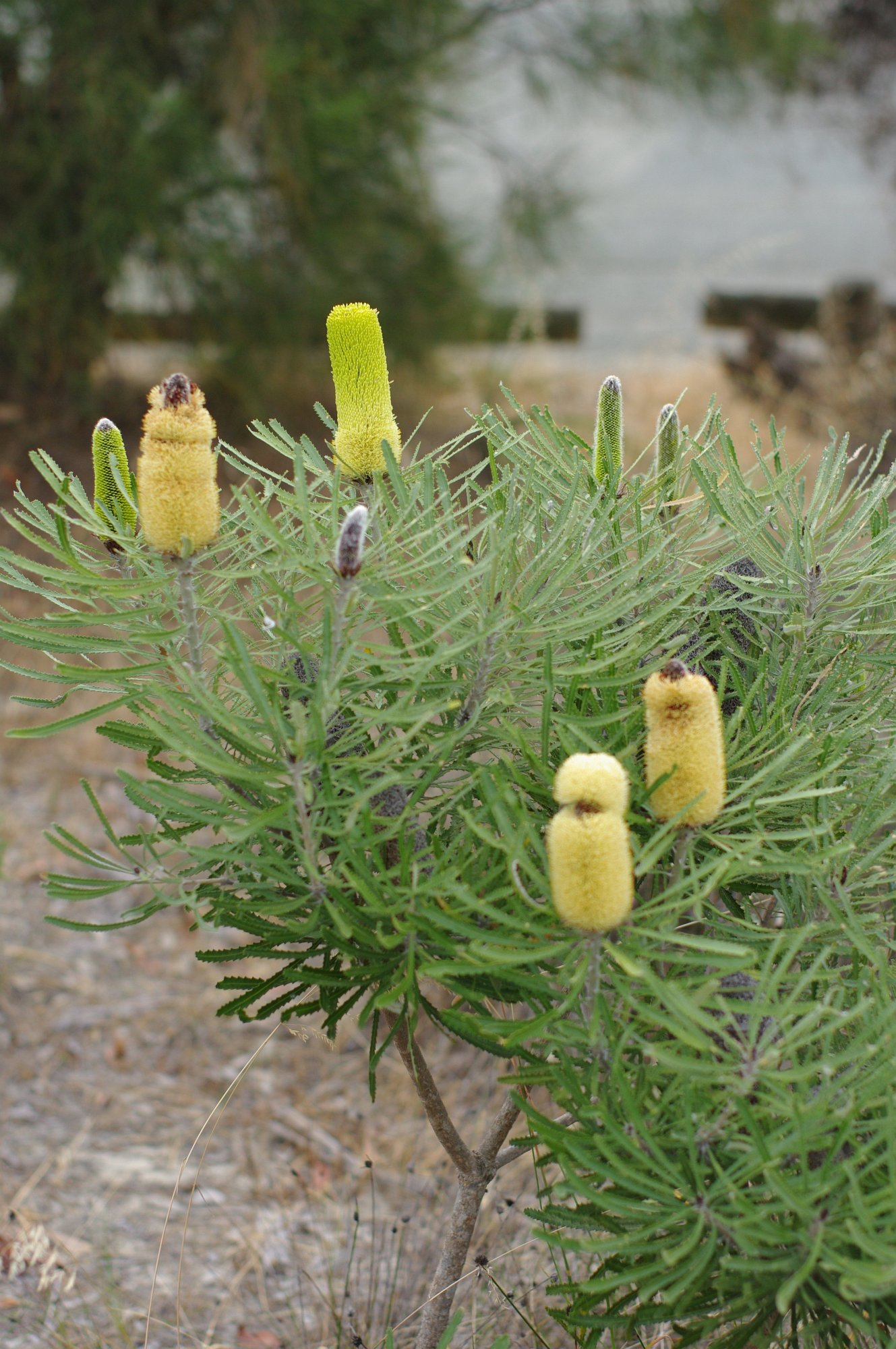
A young plant with several flower spikes rises prominently above the foliage. They are in different stages of development from bud through to maturity.

All banksias have developed proteoid or cluster roots in response to the nutrient-poor conditions of Australian soils (particularly lacking in phosphorus). These have been measured in Eneabba extending to a depth of 15 cm (5.9 in) below the soil surface. The plant develops masses of fine lateral roots which form a mat-like structure underneath the soil surface, and enable it to extract nutrients as efficiently possible out of the soil. A study of three co-occurring species in Banksia woodland in southwestern Australia—Banksia menziesii, B. attenuata and B. ilicifolia—found that all three develop fresh roots in September after winter rainfall, and that the bacteria populations associated with the root systems of B. menziesii differ from the other two, and that they also change depending on the age of the roots. Another study on root architecture of Banksia hookeriana, B. menziesii and B. attenuata found the overall structure of all three to be similar, with proteoid mats more active and growing in wetter months (winter-spring). Plants send out several sinker roots which descend to reach the water table, and the original tap root may or may not have died off. Along with B. menziesii, B. attenuata is a facultative phreatophyte. The two species are less strictly tied to the water table and hence able to grow in a wider variety of places within Banksia woodland habitat around Perth than the co-occurring B. ilicifolia and B. littoralis. A study at a rehabilitation site on a sand mine north of Perth found that the broadleaved species B. attenuata and B. hookeriana were harder to establish than the fine-leaved B. leptophylla there, due to increased impedance of the disturbed soil. Analysis of native plant species at a remnant of banksia woodland in suburban Perth which had been invaded by two herbaceous weed species (Ehrharta calycina and Pelargonium capitatum) found increased phosphorus levels in native foliage. Although B. attenuata leaves did not have increased phosphorus, they did have reduced levels of manganese—an element which is absorbed into the plant by its proteoid roots, the formation of which can be inhibited by raised levels of phosphorus.

In a 1985 study inoculating cultivated plants, Banksia attenuata showed moderate to high susceptibility to Phytophthora cinnamomi dieback; and at least some field and cultivation evidence points to it being highly susceptible. P. cinnamomi spreads from plant to plant via lateral roots, advancing at a rate of around a metre a year. The symptoms of infection in Banksia attenuata include yellowing of the leaves in the tree crown, and lesions at the base of the trunk. The red healthy roots become discoloured brown. A study of Banksia attenuata woodland 400 km (250 mi) southeast of Perth across 16 years and following a wave of P. cinnamomi infestation showed that B. attenuata populations still existed but were significantly reduced in diseased areas. Injecting a solution of phosphite into the trunks of affected B. attenuata trees at a disease front in Banksia woodland can delay morbidity from dieback for five years. Injecting and spraying phosphite also reduces the rate of spread of a dieback front for around five years. A bushfire did not influence this slowing. A 2003 study found that drenching the soil with 0.50 mM benzoic acid significantly reduced the size of P. cinnamomi lesions. Research into dieback in Western Australia has identified a new species, P. multivora, isolated from ailing eucalypts and B. attenuata in 2009.

== Cultivation and cultural use ==
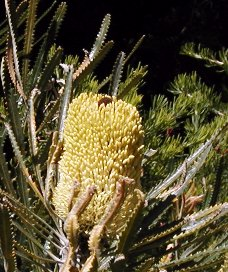
Dwarf form in cultivation; Margaret River

The well-displayed bright yellow spikes are an attractive feature, with shrubby dwarf forms more versatile horticulturally. All forms of Banksia attenuata require good drainage, sandy soil and a sunny position to do well, with a pH between 5.5 and 7.0. They are sensitive to dieback, and do not fare well in humid climates. Seeds do not require any treatment, and take 16 to 49 days to germinate. Seedlings are highly vulnerable to damping off. Plants take from four to six years to flower from seed. There has been little success with other methods of improving adaptability to humid climates such as grafting. Flower spikes in late bud are used in the cut flower industry, primarily in Western Australia.

Aboriginal people, particularly the Nyoongar and Yamatji, placed the flower spike in a paperbark-lined hole filled with water to make a sweet drink. Both this species and B. aemula have been credited with the inspiration behind May Gibbs' Big Bad Banksia Men; this species was familiar to Gibbs in her childhood and likely gave her the initial inspiration, although the depictions resemble the latter species. Artist Marianne North produced a highly regarded painting of B. attenuata during her stay in Australia in 1880–1881.
