= Charles Morgan Lemann =

English botanist

Charles Morgan Lemann (1806–1852) was an English botanist who collected a large number of plant specimens, including some from Madeira and Gibraltar. His collection of 30,000 species was catalogued by George Bentham, and donated to the Herbarium of Cambridge University. Banksia lemanniana was named in honour of him.
