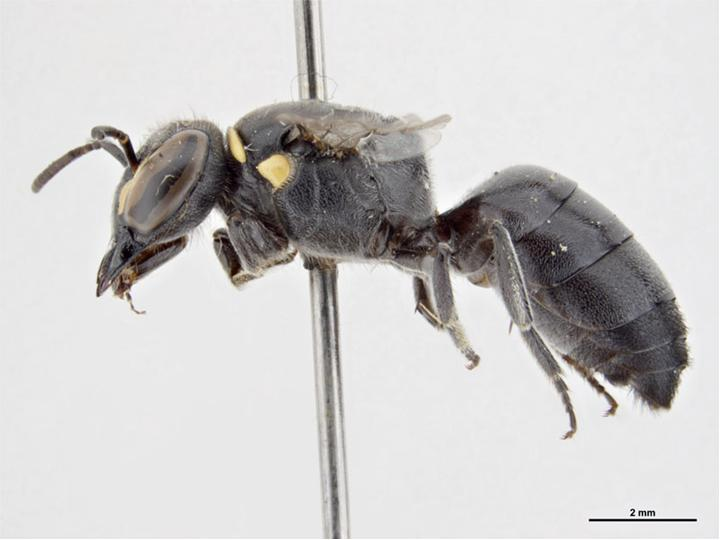
- Female

Scientific classification
- Kingdom: Animalia
- Phylum: Arthropoda
- Clade: Pancrustacea
- Class: Insecta
- Order: Hymenoptera
- Family: Colletidae
- Genus: Hylaeus
- Species: H. globuliferus

Binomial name
- Hylaeus globuliferus (Cockerell, 1929)

Synonyms
- Gnathoprosopis (Sphaerhylaeus) globulifera Cockerell, 1929

= Hylaeus globuliferus =

Species of bee

Hylaeus globuliferus, or Hylaeus (Sphaerhylaeus) globuliferus, is a species of bee in the family Colletidae and subfamily Hylaeinae. It is endemic to Australia. It was described by British-American entomologist Theodore Dru Alison Cockerell in 1929.

== Description ==
Male body length is about 12 mm. Integumental colouration is mainly black, with chrome yellow markings.

== Distribution and habitat ==
The species occurs in south-west Western Australia. The type locality is King George Sound.

== Behaviour ==
The adults are flying mellivores with territorial males. Flowering plants visited by the bees include Adenanthos, Banksia, Jacksonia and Grevillea species.

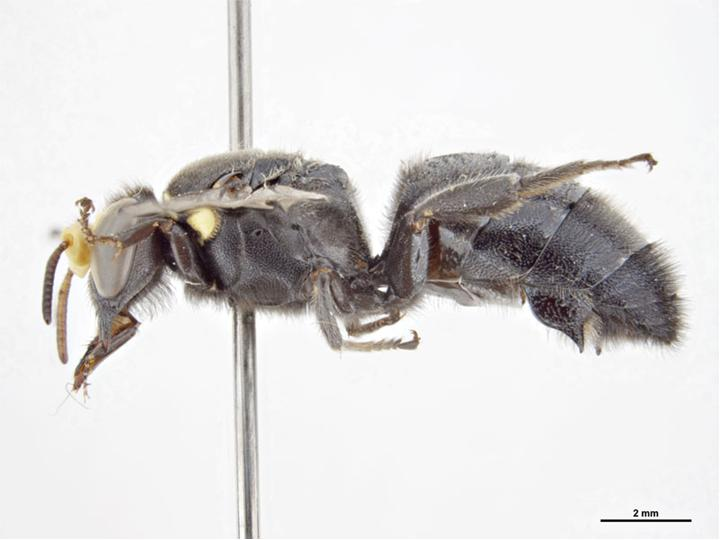
Male
