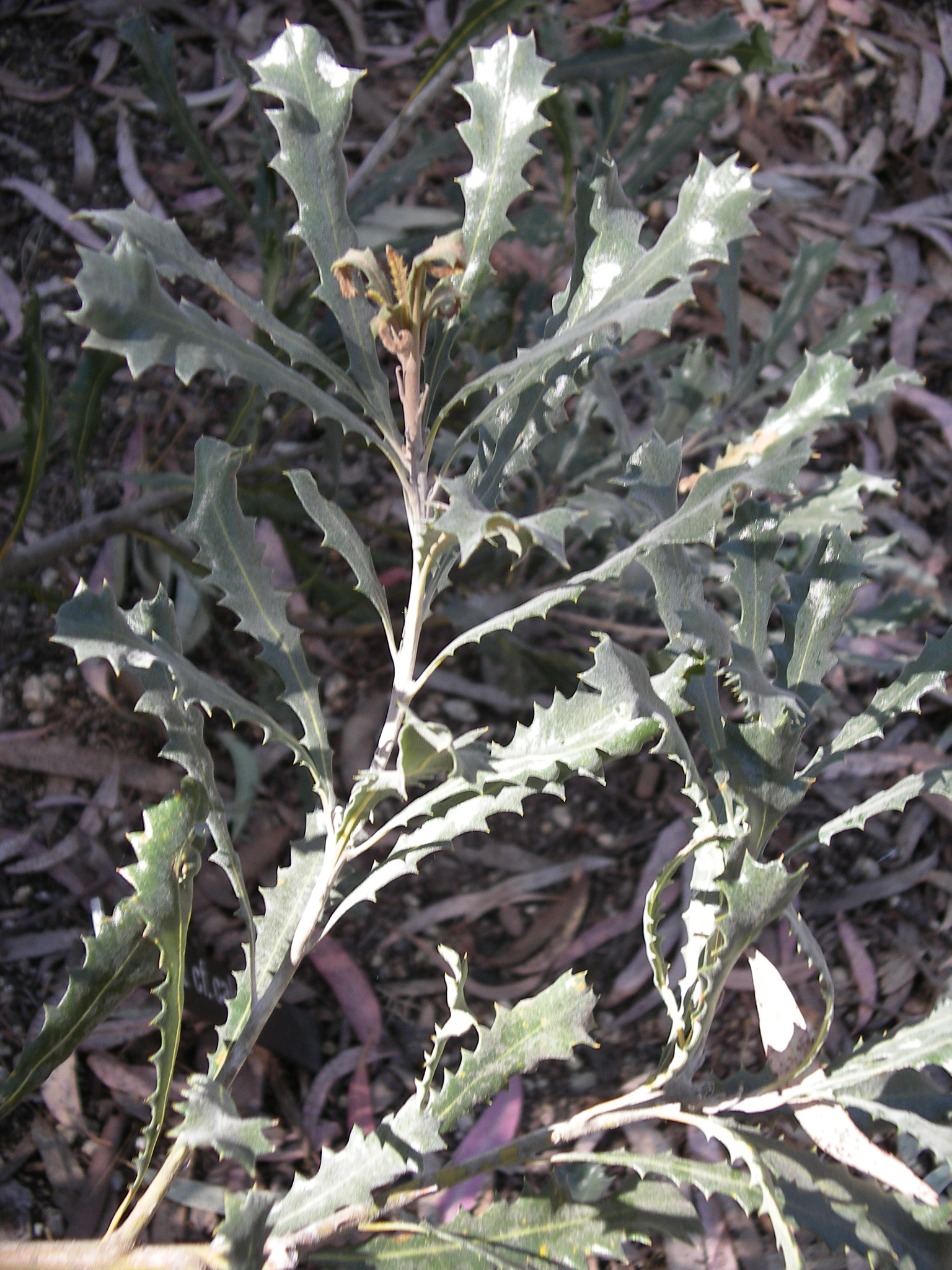
- Foliage of Banksia caleyi, a member of series Tetragonae

Scientific classification
- Kingdom: Plantae
- Clade: Tracheophytes
- Clade: Angiosperms
- Clade: Eudicots
- Order: Proteales
- Family: Proteaceae
- Genus: Banksia
- Subgenus: Banksia subg. Banksia
- Section: Banksia sect. Banksia
- Series: Banksia ser. Tetragonae; A.S.George

Species
- B. lemanniana B. caleyi B. aculeata

= Banksia ser. Tetragonae =

Taxonomic series of Australian plants

Banksia ser. Tetragonae is a taxonomic series in the genus Banksia. It consists of three closely related species of erect shrub with pendulous inflorescences in section Banksia. These are:

Image	Scientific name	Distribution
	B. lemanniana (Lemann's banksia)	Western Australia
	B. caleyi (Cayley's banksia)	Western Australia, from South Stirling to the West River and northeast to Pingrup
	B. aculeata (prickly banksia)	Stirling Range in the southwest of Western Australia
