= Declared Rare and Priority Flora List =

Conservation flora classification system in Western Australia

The Declared Rare and Priority Flora List is the system by which Western Australia's conservation flora are given a priority. Developed by the Government of Western Australia's Department of Environment and Conservation, it was used extensively within the department, including the Western Australian Herbarium. The herbarium's journal, Nuytsia, which has published over a quarter of the state's conservation taxa, requires a conservation status to be included in all publications of new Western Australian taxa that appear to be rare or endangered.

The system defines six levels of priority taxa:

X: Threatened (Declared Rare Flora) – Presumed Extinct Taxa
These are taxa that are thought to be extinct, either because they have not been collected for over 50 years despite thorough searching, or because all known wild populations have been destroyed. They have been declared as such in accordance with the Wildlife Conservation Act 1950, and are therefore afforded legislative protection under that act.
T: Threatened (Declared Rare Flora) – Extant Taxa
These are taxa that have been thoroughly surveyed, and determined to be rare, in danger of extinction, or otherwise in need of special protection. They have been declared rare in accordance with the Wildlife Conservation Act 1950, and are therefore afforded legislative protection under that act. The code for this category was previously 'R'.
P1: Priority One – Poorly Known Taxa
These are taxa that are known from only a few (generally less than five) populations, all of which are under immediate threat. They are candidates for declaration as rare flora, but are in need of further survey.
P2: Priority Two – Poorly Known Taxa
These are taxa that are known from only a few (generally less than five) populations, some of which are not thought to be under immediate threat. They are candidates for declaration as rare flora, but are in need of further survey.
P3: Priority Three – Poorly Known Taxa
That are taxa that are known from several populations, some of which are not thought to be under immediate threat. They are candidates for declaration as rare flora, but are in need of further survey.
P4: Priority Four – Rare Taxa
These are taxa that have been adequately surveyed, and are rare but not known to be under threat.

== See also ==
- Conservation status
- Wildlife Conservation Act 1950, state legislation
- Environment Protection and Biodiversity Conservation Act 1999, federal legislation
- ROTAP (Rare or Threatened Australian Plants) coding system
