= Wildlife Conservation Act 1950 =

Act of the Western Australian Parliament

Parliament of Western Australia
- Long title: An Act to provide for the Conservation and Protection of Wildlife.
- Citation: No. 77 of 1950
- Royal assent: 5 January 1951
- Status: Repealed

The Wildlife Conservation Act 1950 is an act of the Western Australian Parliament that provides the statute relating to conservation and legal protection of flora and fauna. It was replaced by the Biodiversity Conservation Act 2016 on 3 December 2016, and finally repealed as of 1 January 2019 when the Biodiversity Conservation Act 2016 and the Biodiversity Conservation Regulations 2018 became current.

The act was supplemented periodically by notices, which are lists of species subject to protection under the act, for example the Wildlife Conservation (Specially Protected Fauna) Notice 2008. The lists are arranged in schedules according to level of vulnerability. Schedule 1 is "Fauna that is rare or is likely to become extinct" or "Extant [flora] taxa"; Schedule 2 is "Fauna presumed to be extinct" or [Flora] "Taxa presumed to be extinct".

== See also ==
- Biodiversity Conservation Act 2016 (NSW)
- Declared Rare and Priority Flora List
- Department of Environment and Conservation (Western Australia)
- Environment Protection and Biodiversity Conservation Act 1999, federal legislation
- Threatened Species Protection Act 1995, Tasmanian legislation
