= Pendent =

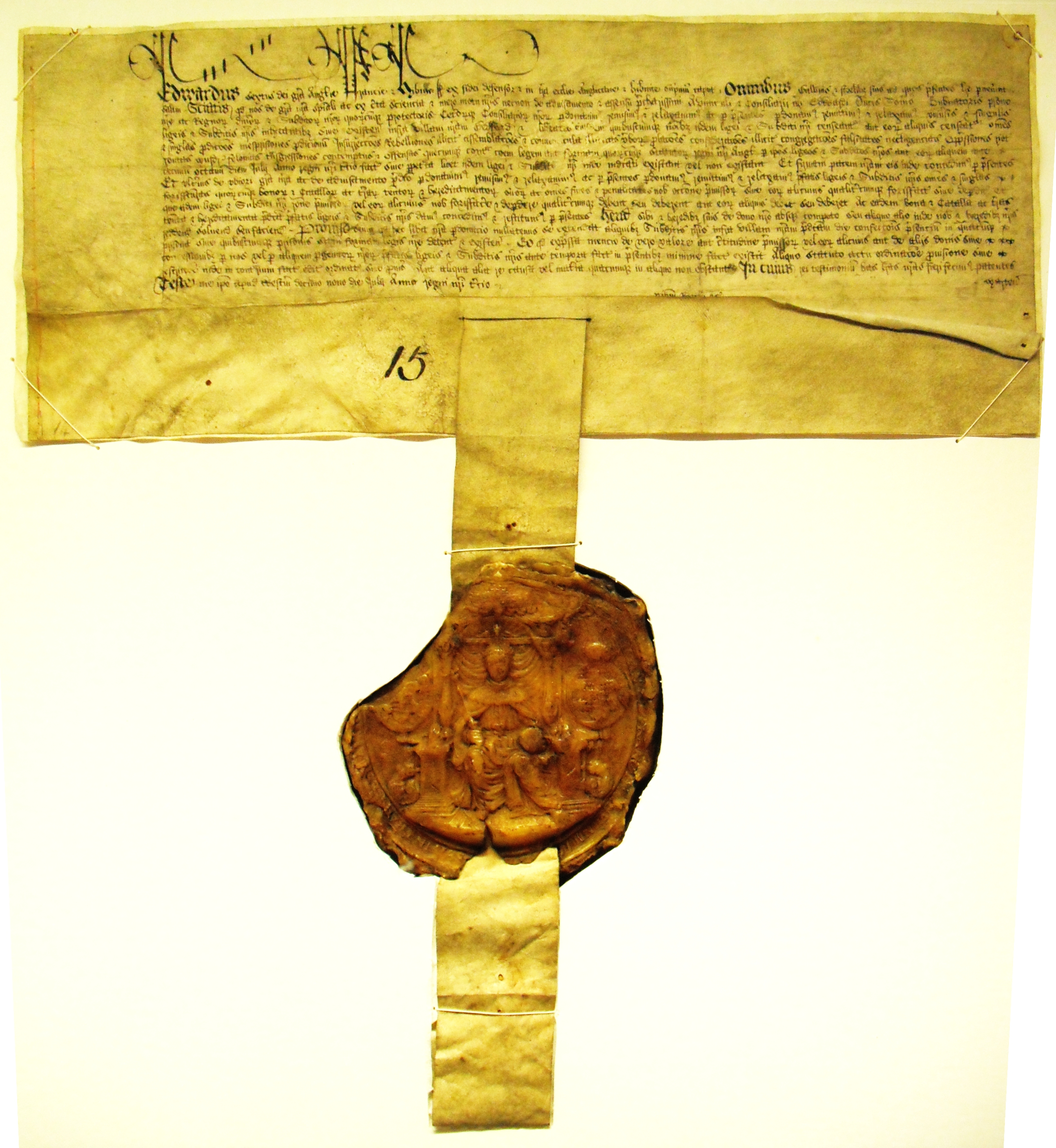
Charter dated 1549, bearing a pendent seal

Pendent is an adjective that describes the condition of hanging, either literally, or figuratively, as in undecided or incomplete. The word is to be distinguished from the spelling "pendant", which is the noun.

- In botany and anatomy the term applies to hanging forms of organs such as leaves, branches, limbs and the like, that otherwise might be rigid or erect.
- In sigillography, a pendent seal is one that hangs loose from its associated document by cords, ribbons, or a parchment tag or tail: it is thus distinguished from an applied seal, which is applied directly to the face of the paper or parchment on which the document is written.
- In various senses, such as legal matters, pendent can mean "pending" or conditional on future developments.
- In grammar a pendent sentence is incomplete in some formal sense, for example lacking a finite verb.

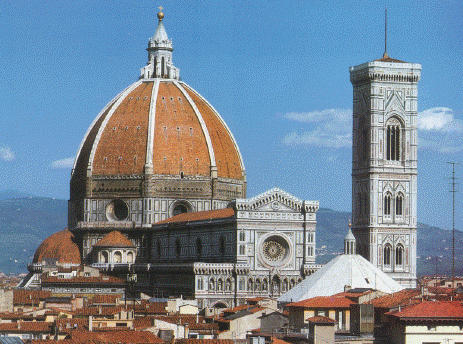
The dome of Florence Cathedral (Santa Maria del Fiore), constructed in segments. The structure is stable because each segment is supported by the others. Such segments are said to be pendent.

Something pendent may be viewed as any member of a support system (e.g. a section of a dome or, organically, a parent/guardian in a nuclear family). A pendent component of a structure or system requires one or more of the same as itself to be functional. For example, one playing card in a house of cards requires another against it in order to maintain stability. Likewise the segments of certain types of dome rely upon each other for support, as do the individual blocks or timber frames which make up a dome whether segmented or not. The whole dome may in turn be supported by pendentives (which in turn support each other). In the construction of arches and domes, the pendent condition commonly leads to special requirements for timber centring or similar expedients during construction: when the structure is completed it becomes self-supporting and the temporary structure can be removed.
