= Seed separator =

Structure found in some plants

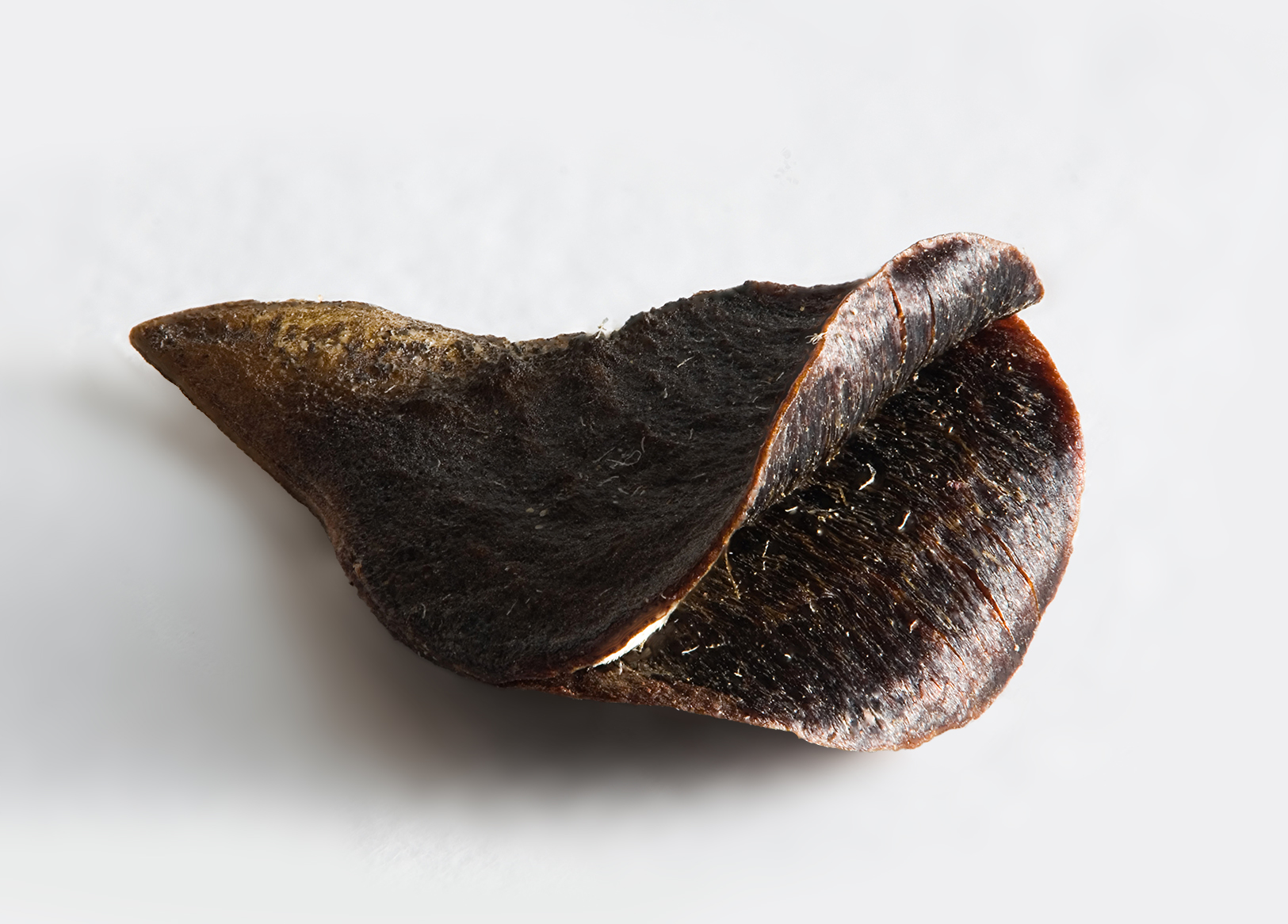
Seed separator of Banksia marginata, with winged seeds still cohering

A seed separator is a woody structure which forms the basal ovule in the follicles of some Proteaceae. In some serotinous species, this structure helps to insulate against extreme heat from fires, and allows the plant to subsequently germinate after the fire has passed.

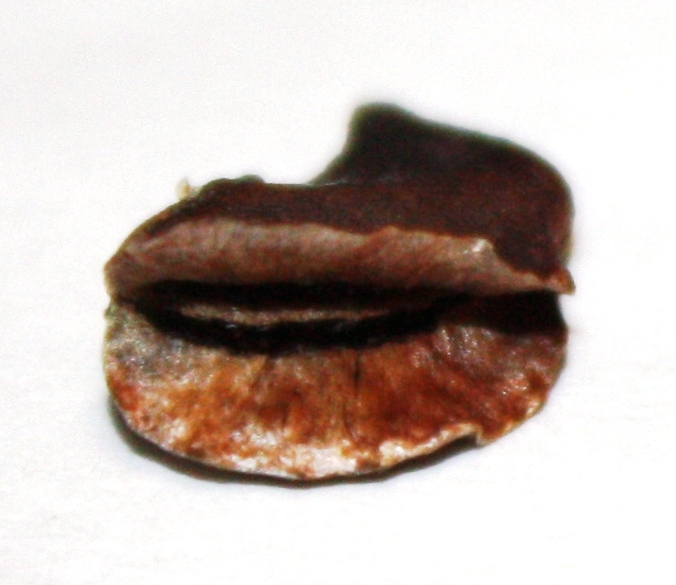
Seed separator of Banksia sessilis, with cohering winged seeds above and below
