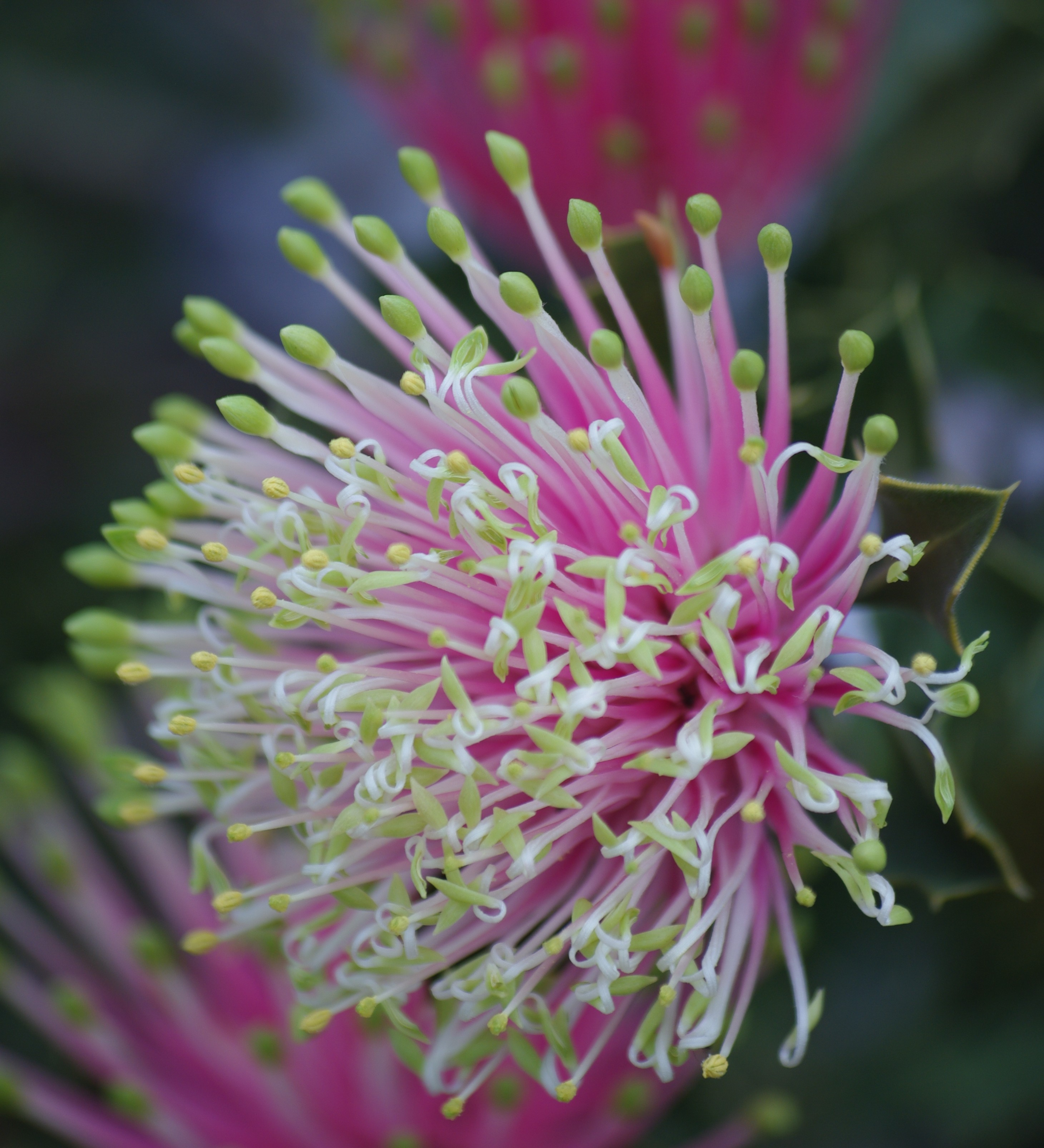

Conservation status
- Endangered (EPBC Act)

Scientific classification
- Kingdom: Plantae
- Clade: Tracheophytes
- Clade: Angiosperms
- Clade: Eudicots
- Order: Proteales
- Family: Proteaceae
- Genus: Banksia
- Subgenus: Banksia subg. Isostylis
- Species: B. cuneata

Binomial name
- Banksia cuneata A.S.George

= Banksia cuneata =

Endangered species of flowering plant

Banksia cuneata, commonly known as matchstick banksia or Quairading banksia, is an endangered species of flowering plant in the family Proteaceae. Endemic to southwest Western Australia, it belongs to Banksia subg. Isostylis, a sub-genus of three closely related Banksia species with inflorescences or flower clusters that are dome-shaped heads rather than characteristic Banksia flower spikes. A shrub or small tree up to 5 m (16 ft) high, it has prickly foliage and pink and cream flowers. The common name Matchstick Banksia arises from the blooms in late bud, the individual buds of which resemble matchsticks. The species is pollinated by honeyeaters (Meliphagidae).

Although B. cuneata was first collected before 1880, it was not until 1981 that Australian botanist Alex George formally described and named the species. There are two genetically distinct population groups, but no recognised varieties. This Banksia is classified as endangered, surviving in fragments of remnant bushland in a region which has been 93% cleared for agriculture. As Banksia cuneata is killed by fire and regenerates from seed, it is highly sensitive to bushfire frequency—fires recurring within four years could wipe out populations of plants not yet mature enough to set seed. Banksia cuneata is rarely cultivated, and its prickly foliage limits its utility in the cut flower industry.

== Description ==
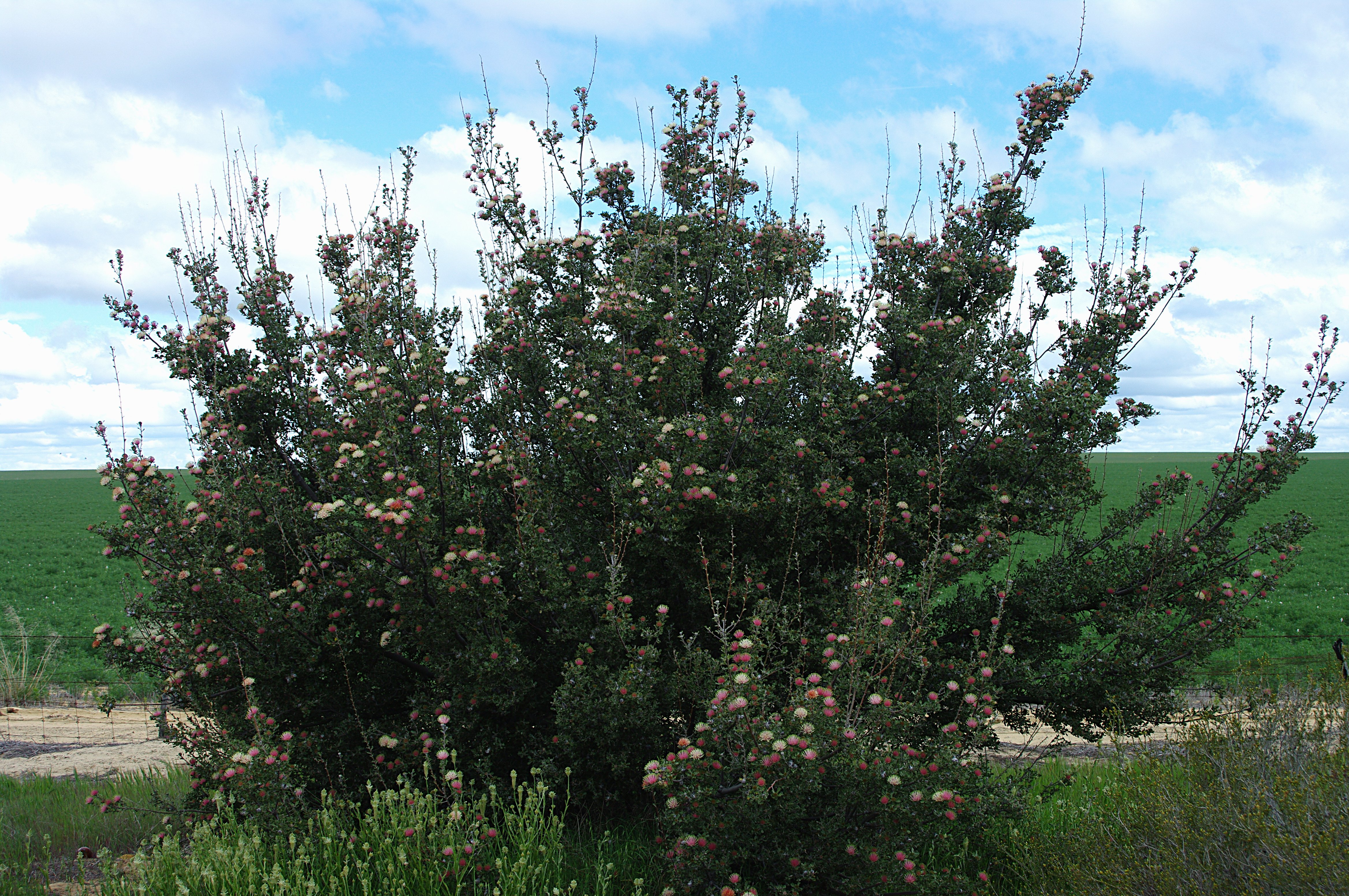
Habit as a 3 m (9.8 ft) high shrub

Banksia cuneata grows as a shrub or small tree up to 5 m (16 ft) high, without a lignotuber. It has one or more main trunks with smooth grey bark, and many branches. Young stems are covered in coarse hairs, but these are lost as the stems age. The leaves are wedge-shaped with serrated edges, having from one to five teeth along each side. They range from 1 to 4 cm (0.5 to 1.5 in) long and 0.5 to 1.5 cm (0.20 to 0.59 in) wide, on a petiole of 2 to 3 mm. The upper surface is dull green; as with the stems, both leaf surfaces are covered in coarse hairs when young, but these are soon lost.

Flowers occur in dome-shaped heads from three to four cm (1.2–1.6 in) in diameter, growing at the ends of branches. They comprise 55 to 65 individual flowers, enclosed at the base by a whorl of short involucral bracts. As with most other Proteaceae, each flower consists of a perianth comprising four united tepals, and a single pistil, the style of which is initially enclosed within the limb of the perianth, but breaks free at anthesis. In B. cuneata, the perianth is about 2.5 cm (0.98 in) long, with a limb of about 0.4 cm (0.16 in). Prior to anthesis, the long thin perianth topped by a prominent limb resembles a matchstick, which explains one common name for this species. At first, the perianth is mostly cream, being pink only near its base; it later becomes pink throughout. The style is initially cream, but turns red; the pollen presenter is green.

Old flowers soon fall from the flower heads (often called cones at this stage), revealing a woody base which may have up to five follicles embedded in it. These are a mottled grey colour, smooth, felted with short fine hairs, and measure from 1 to 1.3 cm (0.39 to 0.51 in) high, 1.7 to 2.1 cm (0.67 to 0.83 in) along the seam, and 0.9 to 1.2 cm (0.35 to 0.47 in) across the seam. Each follicle contains up to two seeds; these are roughly triangular in shape, with a large papery wing.

Banksia cuneata is most easily distinguished from the other two species in B. subg. Isostylis by its brighter flowers and duller leaves. It further differs from B. ilicifolia in its smaller habit; its smooth bark; its smaller leaves, flowers and fruit; and in its sequence of flower colour changes. The leaves, flowers and fruit of B. oligantha are smaller still, and its foliage is not as prickly as that of B. cuneata.

== Taxonomy ==
=== Discovery and naming ===
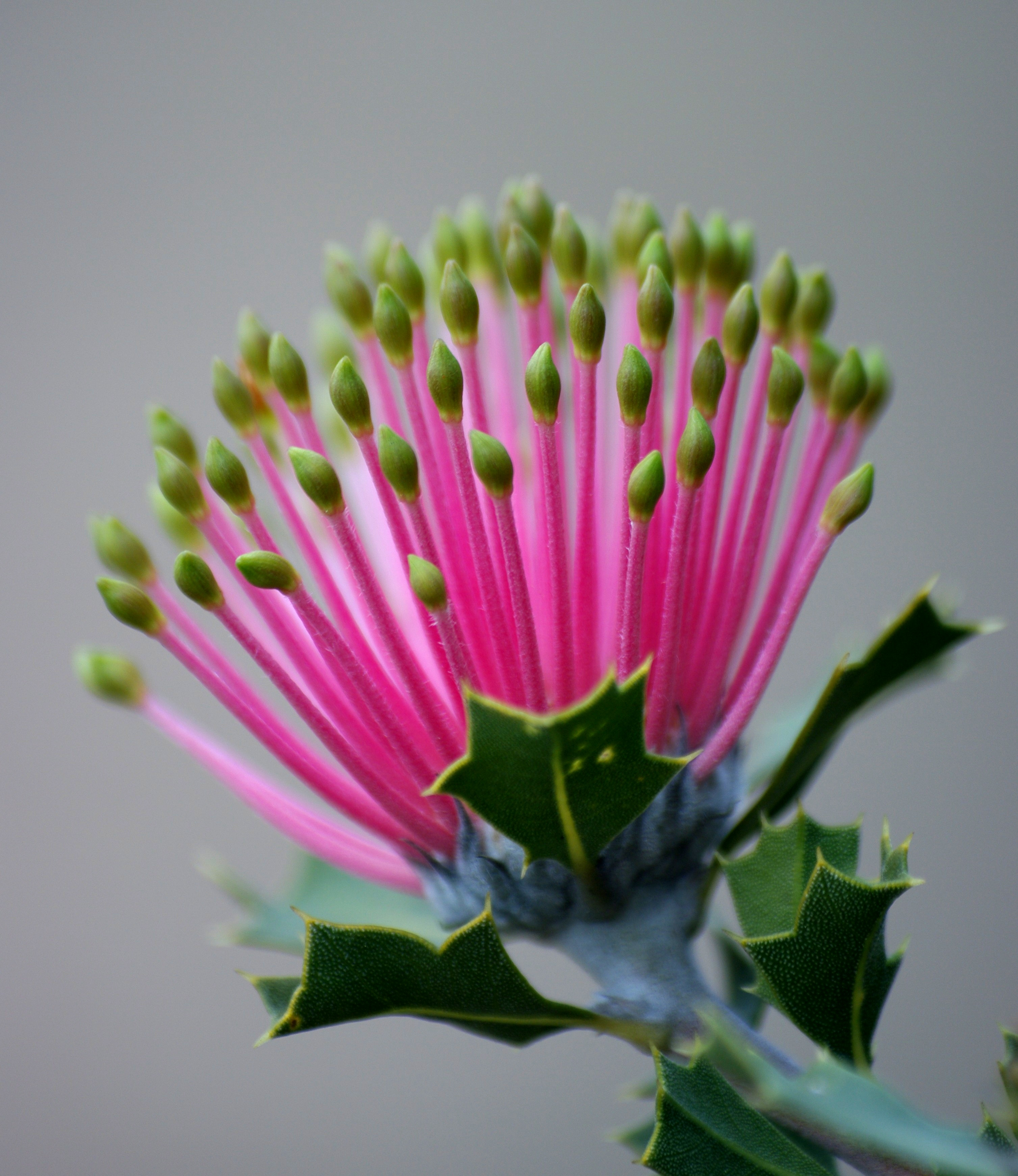
The "matchstick" appearance in late bud gives rise to the common name.

The earliest known specimen collection of B. cuneata was made by Julia Wells some time before 1880. What would later become the type specimen for the species was collected by Western Australian botanist and Banksia expert Alex George on 20 November 1971, from Badjaling Nature Reserve, about 8 km (5.0 mi) east of Quairading, at 31°59′S 117°30′E. The species was finally published by George nearly a decade later, in his 1981 monograph "The genus Banksia L.f. (Proteaceae)". The specific epithet is from the Latin cuneatus ("wedge-shaped"), in reference to the shape of the leaves.

The species has an uneventful nomenclatural history: it has no synonyms, and no subspecies or varieties have been published. It bears the common names of Matchstick Banksia or Quairading Banksia.

=== Infrageneric placement ===
George placed B. cuneata in subgenus Isostylis because of its dome-shaped flower heads. A 1996 cladistic analysis of the genus by botanists Kevin Thiele and Pauline Ladiges yielded no information about the circumscription of B. subg. Isostylis, nor of the relationships within it, so George's placement of this species was retained in their arrangement. That arrangement was not accepted by George, and was largely discarded by him in his 1999 arrangement. The placement of B. cuneata there was unaffected, and can be summarised as follows:

Banksia

B. subg. Banksia (3 sections, 11 series, 73 species, 11 subspecies, 14 varieties)
B. subg. Isostylis

B. ilicifolia
B. oligantha
B. cuneata

Since 1998, American botanist Austin Mast and co-authors have been publishing results of ongoing cladistic analyses of DNA sequence data for the subtribe Banksiinae, which then comprised genera Banksia and Dryandra. Their analyses suggest a phylogeny that differs greatly from George's taxonomic arrangement. Banksia cuneata resolves as the next closest relative, or "sister", to a clade containing B. ilicifolia and B. oligantha, suggesting a monophyletic B. subg. Isostylis; but the clade appears fairly derived (that it, it evolved relatively recently), suggesting that B. subg. Isostylis may not merit subgeneric rank.

Early in 2007, Mast and Thiele rearranged the genus Banksia by merging Dryandra into it, and published B. subg. Spathulatae for the taxa having spoon-shaped cotyledons; thus B. subg. Banksia was redefined as encompassing taxa lacking spoon-shaped cotyledons. They foreshadowed publishing a full arrangement once DNA sampling of Dryandra was complete; in the meantime, if Mast and Thiele's nomenclatural changes are taken as an interim arrangement, then B. cuneata is placed in B. subg. Banksia.

=== Phylogeny ===
Relationships between B. cuneata and the other members of B. subg. Isostylis still remain unclear. Though Mast's studies found B. cuneata to be the most basal of the three species, a 2004 study of genetic divergence within the subgenus yielded both other possibilities: some analyses suggested B. ilicifolia as basal, while others suggested B. oligantha. Further complicating the situation is the southernmost population of B. cuneata, which has both genetic and phenetic affinities with B. oligantha located to the southeast. The origin of this population is unknown. It might have arisen through hybridisation, or it may be a transitional or even ancestral form. Finally, biogeographical factors suggest that B. ilicifolia would be the most basal of the three species: it occurs in the High Rainfall Zone where relictual species are most common, whereas the others are restricted to the Transitional Rainfall Zone, where more recently evolved species are most common.

== Distribution and habitat ==
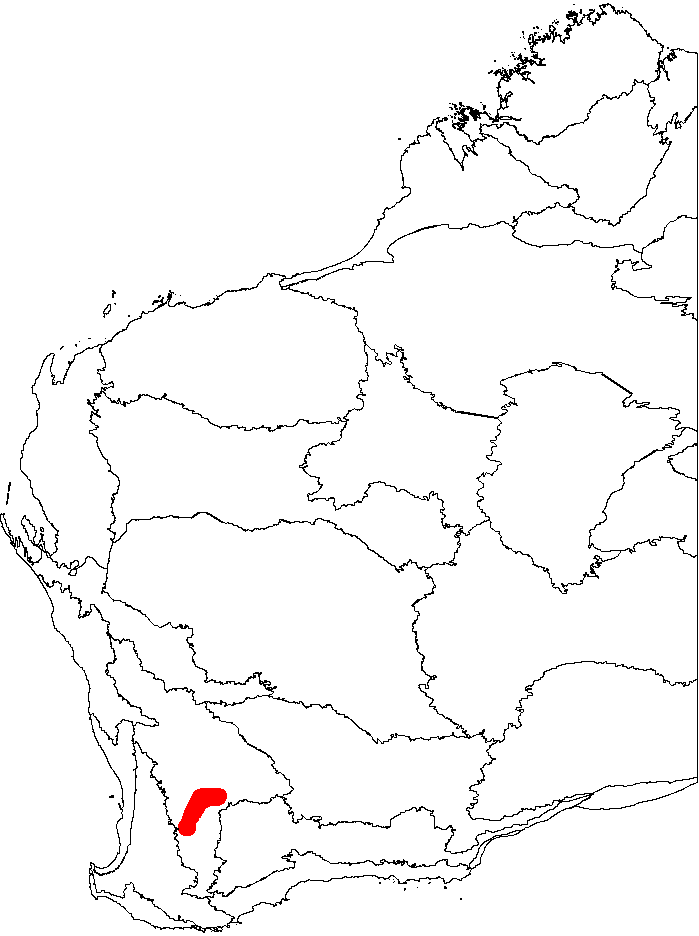
Distribution of B. cuneata in Western Australia

An endangered species, B. cuneata occurs only over a 90 km (56 mi) range around Pingelly and Quairading, in Western Australia. It favours deep yellow sand at elevations between 230 and 300 m (750 and 980 ft), in woodland habitat. It often grows in association with Banksia prionotes and Xylomelum angustifolium.

Reports on the number of populations and individuals vary widely. A survey in 1982 reported 450 plants in five populations, with the largest population comprising 300 plants. In 1988, however, only four populations comprising 300 plants were found; surprisingly, only fifty plants could be found in the location where a population of 300 had previously been reported; yet there were no dead plants, and no evidence of disturbance. Since then the number of populations reported have ranged from 6 to 11, and reports of the total number of plants have ranged from 340 to 580.

== Life cycle and ecology ==
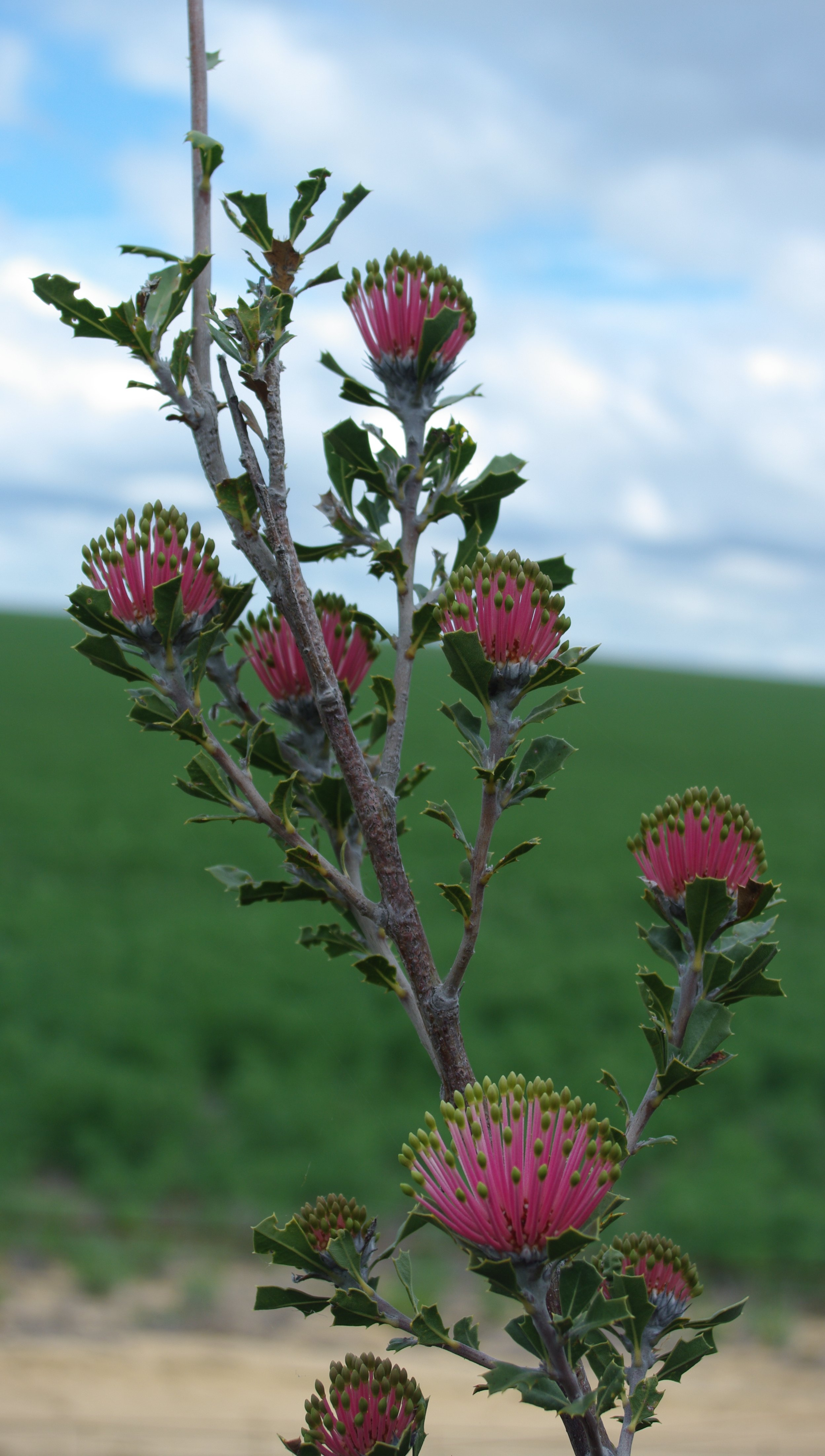
The inflorescences are located at the end of branches. This is often the case with bird-attracting plants, as birds forage by vision.

Pollinated primarily by honeyeaters, the inflorescences appear from September to December. Prominent flowers, a red or pink colour, a straight style and a tubular perianth are features thought to promote pollination by birds. The structure of B. cuneata's flower, with the style end functioning as a pollen presenter, suggests that autogamous self-fertilisation must be common. This is countered, however, by protandry: pollen is released well before the pistil becomes receptive; usually by the time the pistil becomes receptive most of the pollen has either been transferred, or has lost its viability. This strategy is effective against individual flowers fertilising themselves, but does nothing to prevent geitonogamy: fertilisation of flowers by different flowers on the same plant. Because of the way flowers are clustered together in heads, this must be quite common, although whether it results in successful fruit set is another matter: isozyme studies have observed "intense selection against homozygotes", a fairly common outbreeding strategy in plants that set much seed.

Assessments of the mating system of this species have found that outcrossing rates vary between populations. Populations in relatively intact bushland have high outcrossing rates, but those in more disturbed environments are both more inbred on average, and more variable. This has been attributed to a range of causes. Firstly, the higher density of disturbed populations leads to greater rates of mating between neighbouring plants, resulting in more genetic structure and thus more effective selfing. Secondly, disturbed populations usually lack an understorey, and so cannot support a resident population of honeyeaters; instead, they rely upon occasional visitors for pollination. The greatly reduced pollination rates means fewer outcrossing fertilisations on average, leading to less selection against inbred fertilisations; and the sporadic presence of pollinators leads to outcrossing variability.

No seed is set when pollinators are excluded, indicating that seed set must be pollinator-limited. About 96% of fertilized follicles mature, and about 82% of seeds mature. These are very high numbers for Banksia, indicating that there are no problems with nutrient supply. This species produces an unusually high number of old flowerheads, or cones, per plant—typically more than 500. However, there are an unusually low number of follicles per cone—often only one. Thus the number of follicles per plant ends up roughly average for a Banksia species.

Banksia cuneata lacks a lignotuber, so plants are killed by bushfire. However, this species is strongly serotinous: seed is released only following a fire. Thus plants accumulate an aerial seed bank in fire intervals, which is released all at once after a fire, ensuring population regeneration. The mechanism is a resin that seals the follicles shut, preventing dehiscence; the heat of a bushfire melts the resin, and the follicles open. Intense fires cause the immediate release of the seed and seed separator, but after cooler fires the seed separator often remains in place, blocking the follicle exit and preventing seed release. The wings on the seed separator are hygroscopic; they draw together when moistened, then reflex out again as they dry. Thus they lever themselves, and the seeds, out of the follicle over the course of one or more wet-dry cycles, ensuring that seed is released only after rain has fallen. The juvenile period for B. cuneata is around four years. Populations are very vulnerable to fire during this period, as fire will wipe out the entire population and there will be no seed from which it might recover. A model-based investigation found that the optimal fire interval for maximising population size over the medium term is around 15 years. More frequent fires reduce population size by killing adults before they have reached their full fecundity. Less frequent fires reduce population size because there are fewer opportunities for seed dispersal and germination. However, the optimal fire interval for minimising the risk of extinct in the long term is probably much longer.

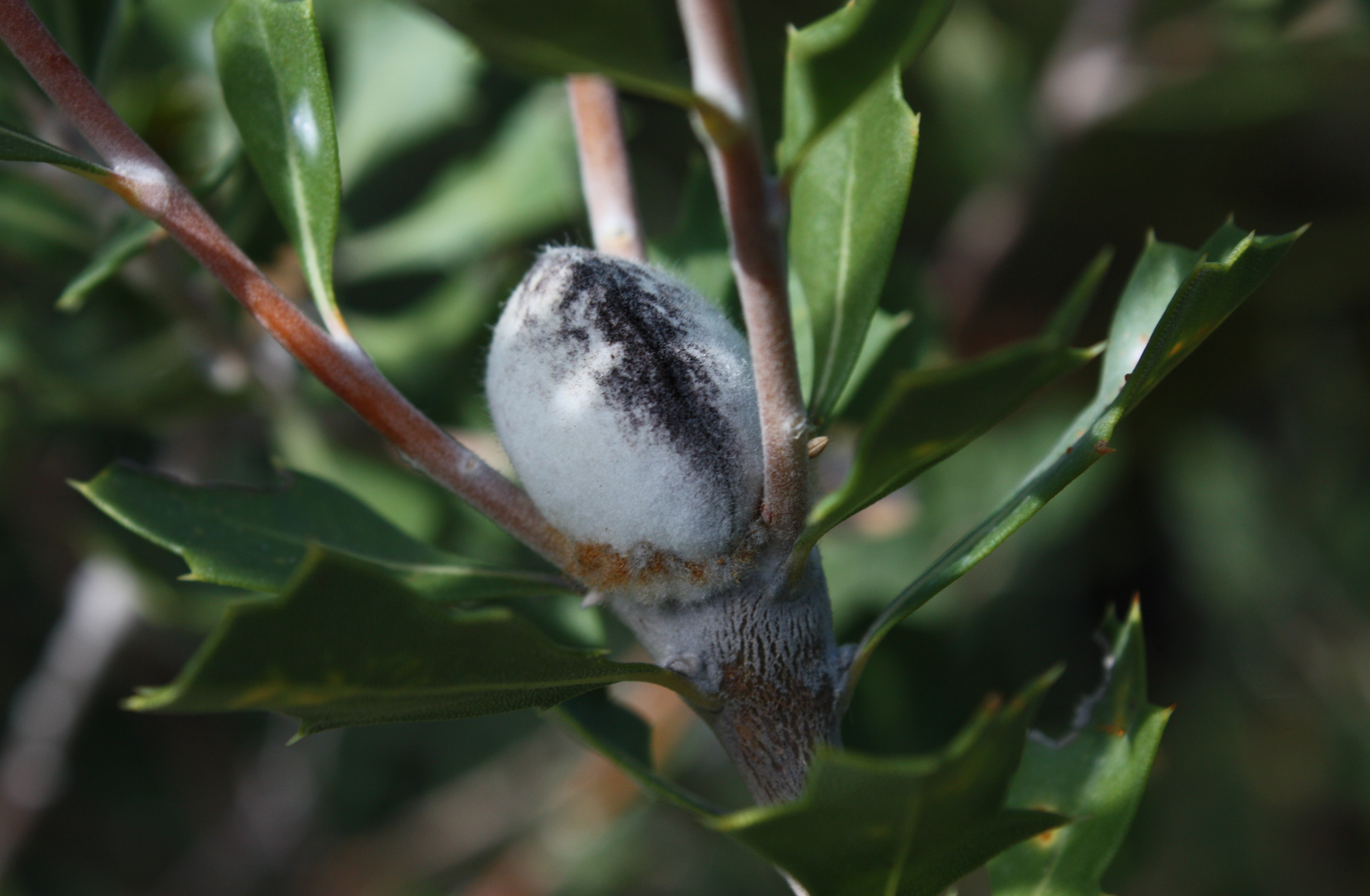
Woody follicle

B. cuneata is very unusual in apparently suffering no seed loss due to granivory. In nearly all other species, burrowing insect larvae eat a large proportion of seeds, and birds cause further losses in breaking open cones in search of larvae to eat. The seed-eating insects are mostly species-specific, and it appears that no insect species has adapted to B. cuneata. Possible reasons for this are the very low seed counts, and the rarity of the species, both of which offer little incentive for adaptation to the species. There is also no evidence of granivores feeding on seed after it has fallen. As a result, this species has the highest rate of seed viability recorded for a Banksia species: in one study, 74% of all seed produced in the previous 12 years was viable. This was largely accounted for by seed under 9 years old, about 90% of which is viable. After the ninth year, viability is lost rapidly as the follicles decay and senescence sets in. Seed production itself starts very slowly. On average, plants aged between 5 and 12 years have about 18 seeds stored in their canopy. Storage increases exponentially, however, and 25-year-old plants often have tens of thousands of seeds. Seed production probably never plateaus. In fact, by the time a plant is twenty years old it has accumulated such a great weight of cones that major branches begin to break away; and by the age of thirty, plants have broken branches more often than not. As plants age, branch breakage increasingly leads to plant death, and it is unlikely that any plants live to more than 45 years.

The high seed maturation and viability rates are offset, however, by an extremely low seedling survival rate. This is almost solely due to moisture stress. In one study, an estimated 17,100 viable seeds were released following an experimental fire. Fewer than 5% of them germinated, and only eleven plants survived the first summer drought. The last plants to die were in depressions, in shaded areas or amongst leaf litter; and the eleven survivors were all on road shoulders, where they benefited from road runoff and a 3 cm (1 in) thick mulch of pisolitic laterite. The inevitable conclusion is that seedling survival is primarily determined by water availability.

== Conservation ==
Banksia cuneata was declared critically endangered after a 1982 survey found only five populations comprising about 450 plants. The largest population, consisting of around 300 plants, was on a conservation reserve, but all others were on road verges, and contained only 50–70 plants each. However, since then more plants have been located, and populations have been found to be gradually increasing in response to a number of conservation measures including fencing and baiting of rabbits. In recognition of its slight recovery, it is now considered endangered but no longer critically so.

In April 1987, Western Australia's Department of Environment and Conservation burnt part of one population in an experimental regeneration fire. The mature plants were killed, and the seedlings that volunteered did not survive the summer drought. A Matchstick Banksia Recovery Team was established in 1995, and over time they succeeded in establishing a large number of seedlings. A large adult population was destroyed by bushfire in 1996, causing further concern, but this was followed by the recruitment of large numbers of seedlings.

Threats to B. cuneata include land clearing, which leads to direct plant loss and population fragmentation, grazing pressure, competition from exotic weeds, changes to the fire regime, and encroaching salinity. The Banksia Atlas survey found one population to be on the side of a road; the plants were aging with no new seedlings noted, and the site was weed-infested. A large part of the surviving populations are on private land, and depend on good relationships with local landowners. Many have obliged by fencing off areas and restricting entry of rabbits. There has been some attempt by CALM to translocate populations away from hazardous areas; these have met with some success, helped with watering in the first year.

=== Land clearing ===
Even before the extensive clearing of the Wheatbelt in the 1930s, B. cuneata must have had a highly fragmented distribution, since the deep yellow sand favoured by the species occurs only in patches, and makes up only 10 to 15% of the area. Around 93% of the land has now been cleared of native vegetation, with the remaining 7% occurring in remnants of various sizes. Thus land clearing must have further fragmented an already fragmented population, as well as greatly reduced the number of individual plants.

=== Protection of genetic diversity ===
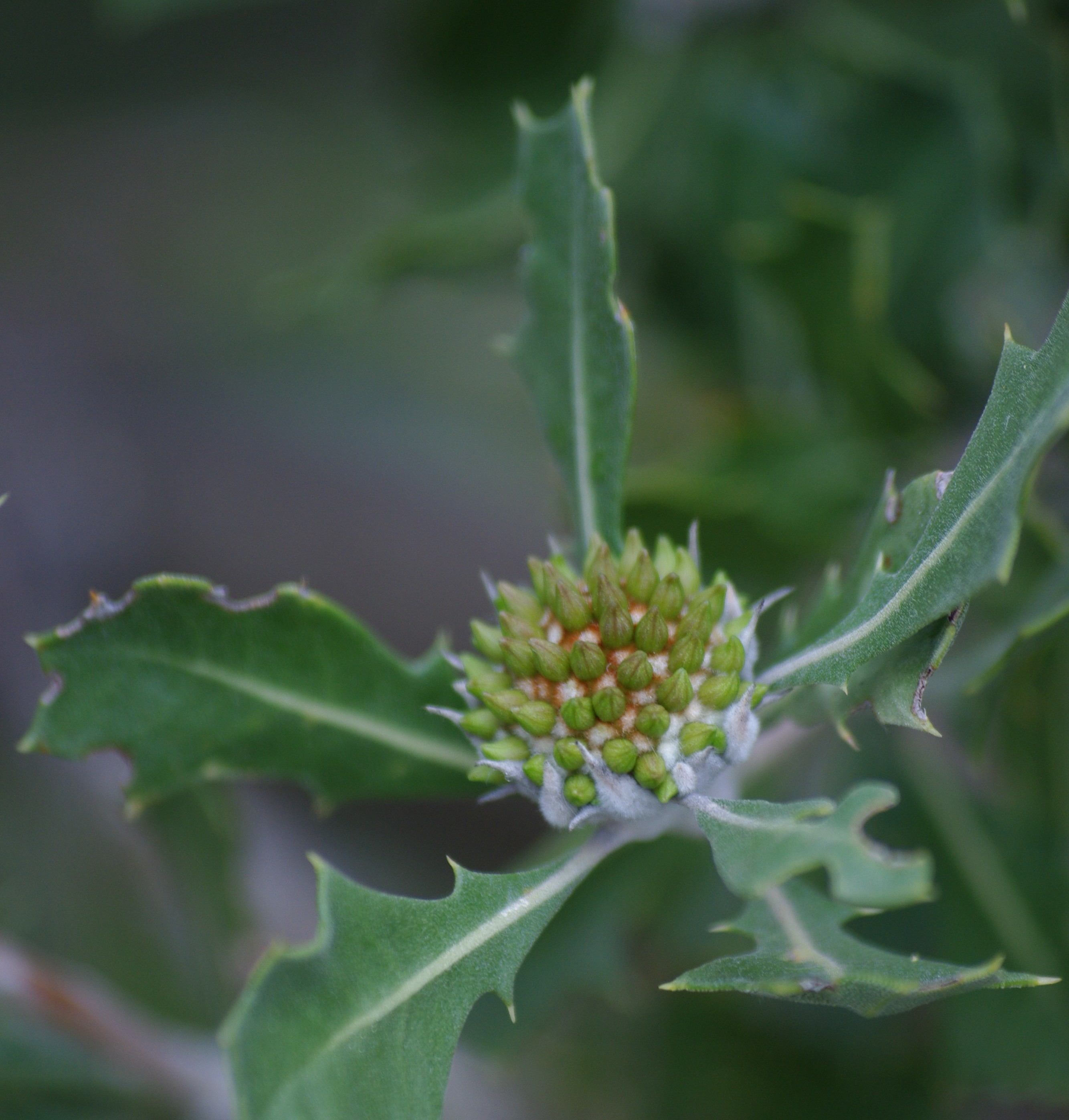
Flowers, such as this one in early bud, develop at the ends of branches.

Levels of genetic diversity within individual populations of B. cuneata are unusually high for a rare and endangered species, but the populations fall into two genetically distinct groups. These are separated not by geographical distance but by the Salt River, an ephemeral saline river system that provides a habitat unsuitable for both B. cuneata and the birds that pollinate it. It thus functions as a barrier to the exchange of genetic material, allowing populations on different sides of the river to diverge through genetic drift. The implication for conservation is that effort should be invested on both sides of the river in order to conserve as much genetic diversity as possible. It was suggested that one large population from each population group would probably be adequate. More recently, however, a model-based risk analysis found that the population size required to reduce extinction risk to acceptable levels is more than ten times the current population size. This leads to the conclusion that all populations, and all available habitat, should be protected.

=== Disease ===
Phytophthora cinnamomi dieback has not been identified as a threat to this species, but testing has found it to be highly susceptible; in one study it exhibited the highest susceptibility of 49 Banksia species studied, with 80% of plants dead within 96 days of inoculation with the disease, and 100% dead within a year.

=== Climate change ===
The survival of this species is tied closely to rainfall because of the susceptibility of seedlings to drought. It is thus especially vulnerable to the effects of climate change. This was recognised as early as 1992, when it was noted that winter rainfall in the Quairading region had been falling by about 4% per decade, and that a continuation of this trend may reduce the species' distribution. Recently, a more thorough assessment of the potential impact of climate change on this species found that severe change is likely to lead to extinction, and mild change to a reduction of its range by 80% by 2080. However, there may not be any range reduction at all under mid-severity climate change, depending on how effectively this species can migrate into newly habitable areas.

== Uses and cultural references ==
Logo of the Shire of Quairading, depicting inflorescences of B. cuneata

Propagation is by seed, although these are hard to obtain. Seeds do not require any treatment before sowing, and take around 23 days to germinate. Cuttings yield unpredictable results. The plant itself prefers a deep, sandy, well-drained soil with a pH of 6.0–7.0. It requires full sun, but some protection from the wind is recommended, as this is a fast-growing plant with spindly branches that are easily damaged by wind. A more compact form can be obtained by pruning the top quarter each year. This species has little appeal to the cut flower industry because of its prickly foliage, and its tendency to drip nectar.

Ironically, given its conservation status, Kingsley Dixon of Kings Park and Botanic Garden suggested that it may have weed potential: the species was trialled as a cut flower crop on land north of Moore River, and seedlings were noted afterwards.

Banksia cuneata has been adopted as the floral emblem of the Shire of Quairading, and has been incorporated into the shire logo. There is a park named Cuneata Park in the town of Quairading.
