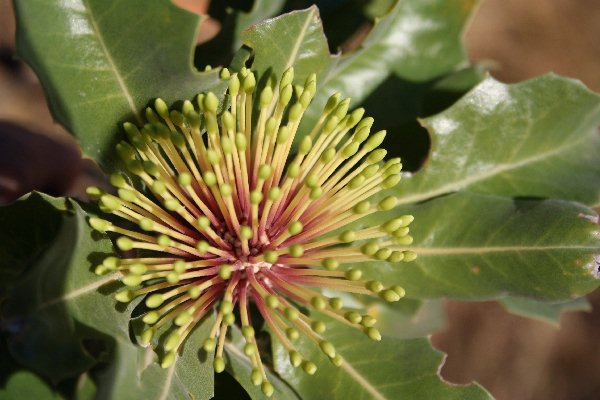

Scientific classification
- Kingdom: Plantae
- Clade: Embryophytes
- Clade: Tracheophytes
- Clade: Spermatophytes
- Clade: Angiosperms
- Clade: Eudicots
- Order: Proteales
- Family: Proteaceae
- Genus: Banksia
- Subgenus: Banksia subg. Isostylis
- Species: B. ilicifolia

Binomial name
- Banksia ilicifolia R.Br.

Synonyms
- Banksia aquifolium Lindl.; Banksia ilicifolia R.Br. var. ilicifolia; Banksia ilicifolia var. integrifolia Benth.; Sirmuellera ilicifolia (R.Br.) Kuntze

= Banksia ilicifolia =

Holly-leaved banksia

Species of tree endemic to Western Australia

Banksia ilicifolia, commonly known as holly-leaved banksia, is a tree in the family Proteaceae. Endemic to southwest Western Australia, it belongs to Banksia subg. Isostylis, a subgenus of three closely related Banksia species with inflorescences that are dome-shaped heads rather than characteristic Banksia flower spikes. It is generally a tree up to 10 metres (33 ft) tall with a columnar or irregular habit. Both the scientific and common names arise from the similarity of its foliage to that of the English holly Ilex aquifolium; the glossy green leaves generally have very prickly serrated margins, although some plants lack toothed leaves. The inflorescences are initially yellow but become red-tinged with maturity; this acts as a signal to alert birds that the flowers have opened and nectar is available.

Robert Brown described Banksia ilicifolia in 1810. Although Banksia ilicifolia is variable in growth form, with low coastal shrubby forms on the south coast near Albany, there are no recognised varieties as such. Distributed broadly, the species is restricted to sandy soils. Unlike its close relatives which are killed by fire and repopulate from seed, Banksia ilicifolia regenerates after bushfire by regrowing from epicormic buds under its bark. It is rarely cultivated.

== Description ==
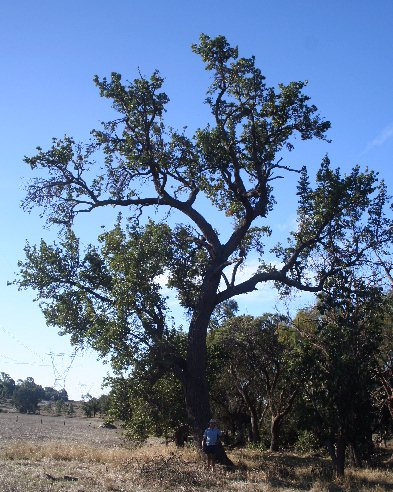
A large tree, near Waroona

Banksia ilicifolia is a variable species. It usually grows as an erect tree up to 10 metres (33 ft) in height, but some populations along the south coast consist of small trees or even spreading shrubs. It is generally 5 metres (16 ft) high small tree in the Margaret River region. The leaves arising from many short branchlets make a dense foliage close to the trunk and branches.

Banksia ilicifolia has a stout trunk up to 50 cm (19.5 in) in diameter, and rough, fibrous, grey bark which is up to 2 cm (1 in) thick. New growth takes place mainly in summer. Young branchlets are covered in hair which they lose after two or three years. Leaves grow on stems less than two years of age, and are arranged in a scattered pattern along the stems although crowded at the apices (branchlet tips). Resembling those of holly, its leaves are a dark shiny green colour, and variously obovate (egg-shaped), elliptic, truncate or undulate (wavy) in shape, and 3–10 cm (1.2–3.9 in) long. Generally serrated, the leaf edges have up to 14 prickly "teeth" separated by broad v- to u-shaped sinuses along each side, although some leaves have margins lacking teeth. The leaves sit atop petioles 0.3–1 cm (0.1–0.4 in) in length. The upper and undersurface of the leaves are initially covered in fine hairs but become smooth with maturity. Flowering takes place from late winter to early summer. The inflorescences are dome-shaped flower heads rather than spikes as many other banksias, and arise from stems that are around a year old. No lateral branchlets grow outwards from the node where the flower head arises. The flower heads measure 7–9 cm (2.8–3.5 in) in diameter, and bear 60 to 100 individual flowers. The inflorescences pass through three colour phases, being initially yellow, then pink, then finally red, before falling away from the head. One to three follicles develop from fertilised flowers, and remain embedded in the woody base of the flower head. Each follicle bears one or two seeds.

The cotyledon leaves are a dull green with no visible nerves or markings. Transversely elliptic in shape, they measure 8 to 13 mm long by 12 to 18 mm wide and range from convex to concave. The pointed spreading auricles are 1.5 mm long. The cotyledon leaves sit atop the stout hypocotyl, which is green and smooth. The seedling leaves are crowded above the cotyledons. Resembling those of B. coccinea, they are lined with triangular lobes or "teeth" (with a u- or v-shaped sinus) and obovate to broadly lanceolate in shape. The first set of leaves measure 1 to 2.5 cm (0.4 to 1.0 in) in length and around 1 cm (0.4 in) in width, with three or four lobes in each margin. Both upper and lower seedling leaf surfaces are covered in spreading hairs, as is the seedling stem. Juvenile leaves are obovate to truncate or mucronate with triangular lobes and measure 4 to 10 cm (1.6 to 3.9 in) long by 1.5 to 3.5 cm (0.6 to 1.4 in) wide. These lobes are smaller toward the petiole and apex of the leaf.

In the Margaret River region, Banksia ilicifolia has been confused with Banksia sessilis var. cordata as both have prickly foliage and domed flowerheads. However, the former grows on deep sand while the latter grows on grey sand over limestone ridges. The embedded follicles of B. ilicifolia compared with the loose ones of B. sessilis are another distinguishing feature.

== Taxonomy ==
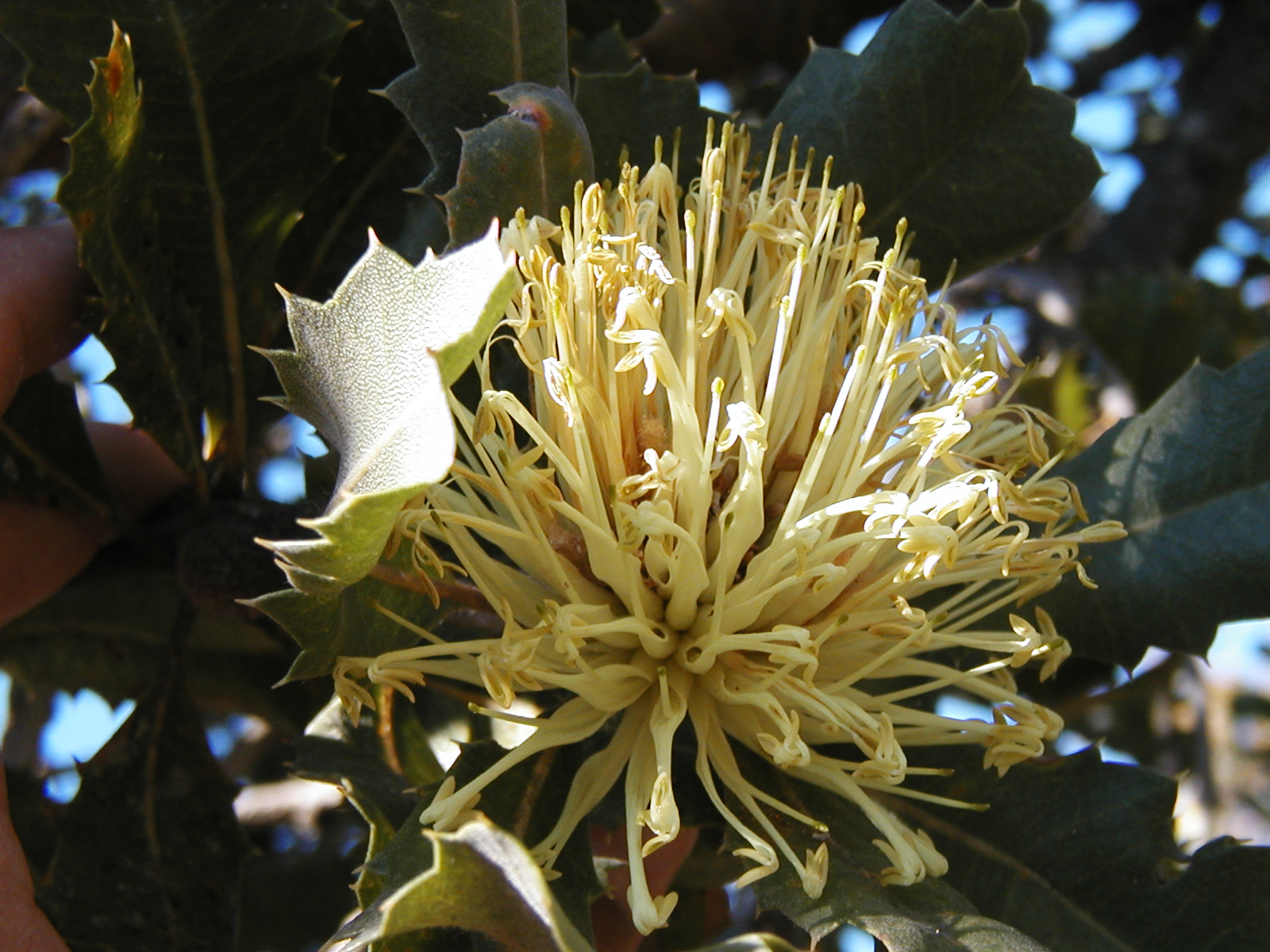
Banksia ilicifolia, unusual all-yellow flowers (after anthesis), near Albany

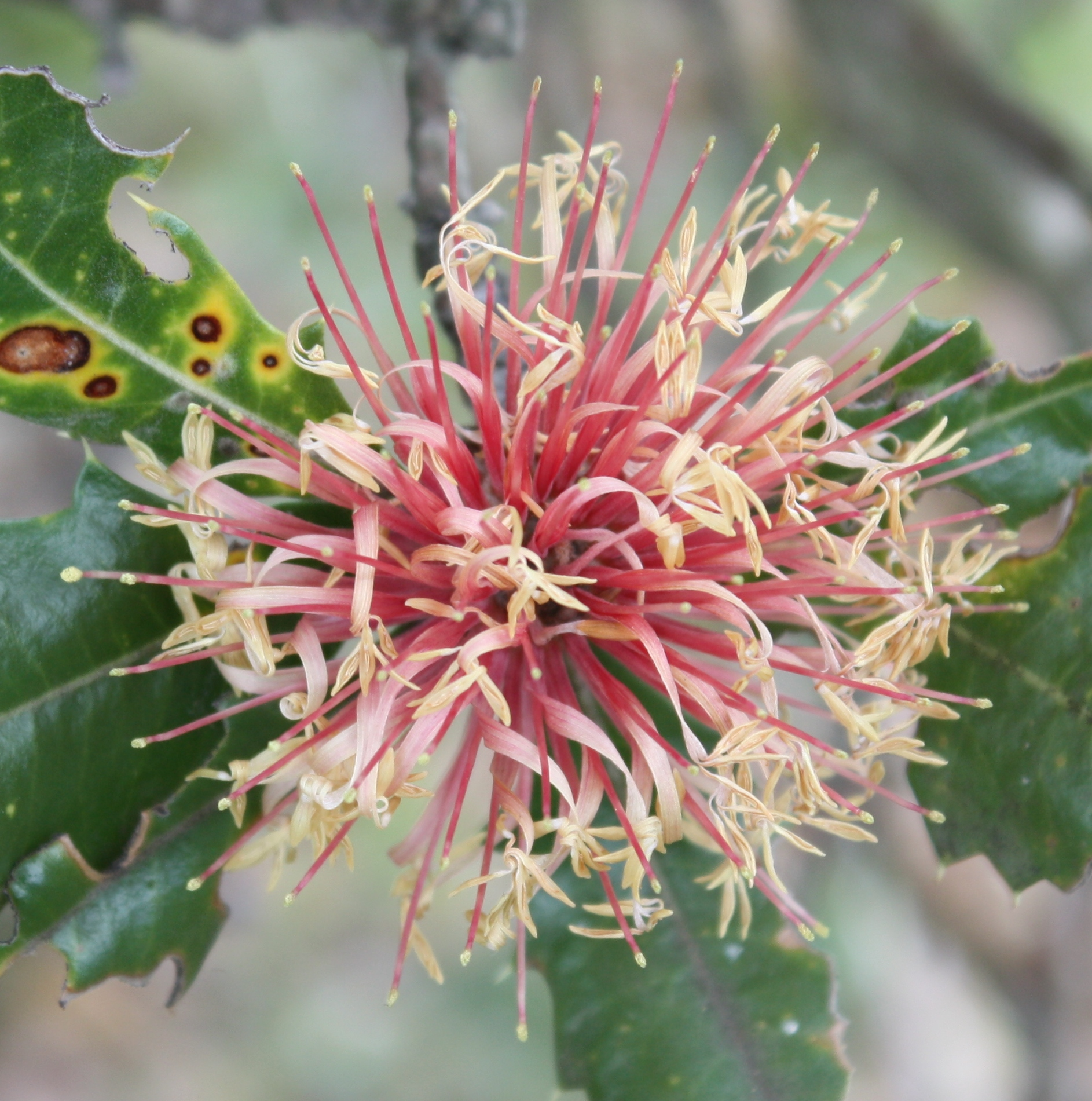
More usual reddish flowers, Perth

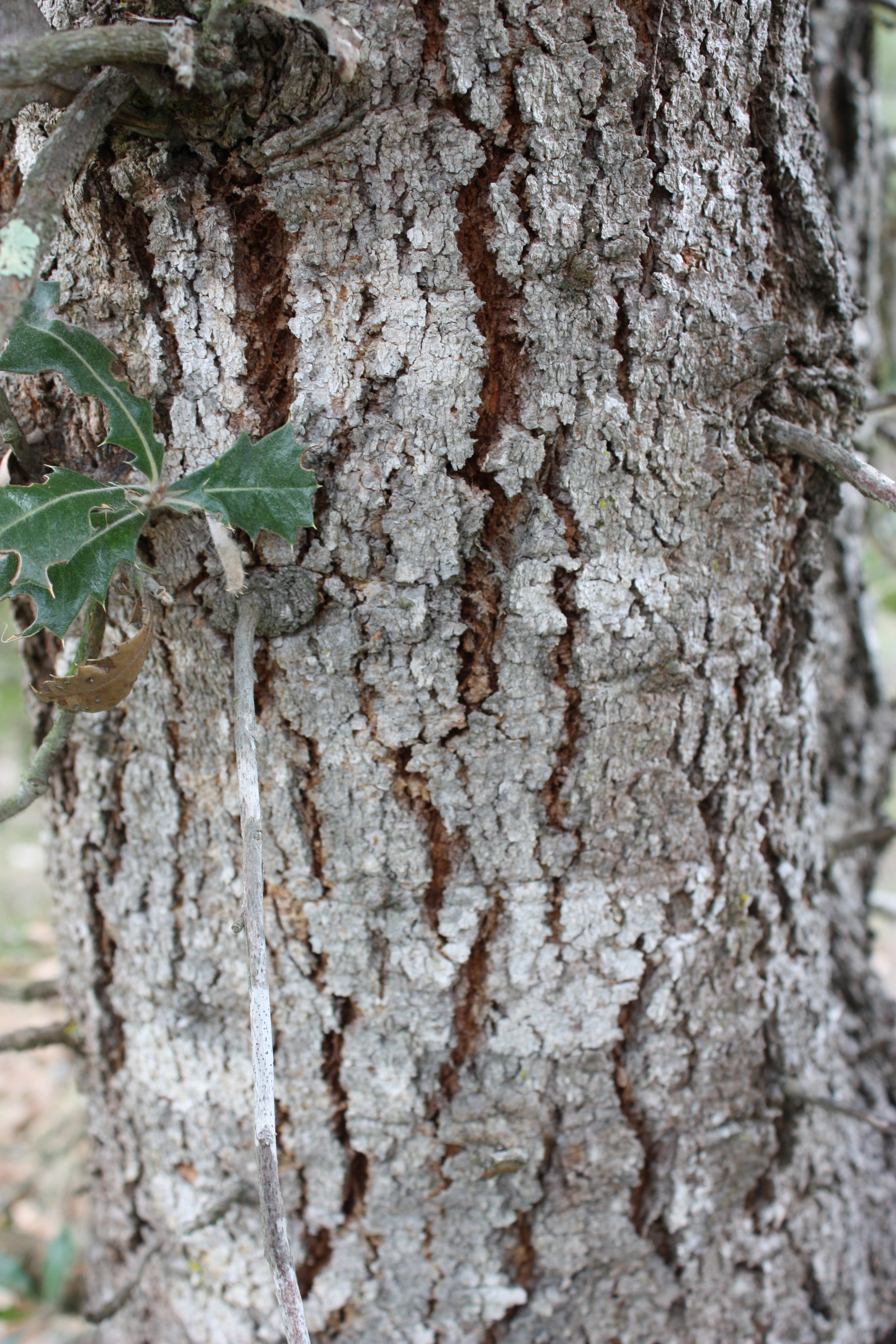
Rough bark, Perth

Specimens of B. ilicifolia were first collected by Scottish surgeon Archibald Menzies during the visit of the Vancouver Expedition to King George Sound in September and October 1791, but this collection did not result in the description of the species. It was next collected by Robert Brown in December 1801, during the visit of HMS Investigator to King George Sound. The species was also drawn by the expedition's botanical artist Ferdinand Bauer. Like nearly all of Bauer's field drawings of Proteaceae, the original field sketch of B. ilicifolia was destroyed in a Hofburg fire in 1945. A painting based on the drawing survives, however, at the Natural History Museum in London.

Brown eventually published the species in his 1810 work On the natural order of plants called Proteaceae. The specific name is derived from the Latin words ilex 'holly' and folium 'leaf', hence 'holly-leaved'. In 1810, Brown published Prodromus Florae Novae Hollandiae et Insulae Van Diemen in which he arranged the genus into two unranked groups. B. ilicifolia was placed alone in Isostylis because of its unusual dome-shaped inflorescences. All other species were placed in Banksia verae, the 'true banksias', because they have the elongate flower spike then considered characteristic of Banksia.

The shrubby, coastal ecotype was published as a separate species Banksia aquifolium by John Lindley in his 1840 A Sketch of the Vegetation of the Swan River Colony, but this is now regarded as a taxonomic synonym of B. ilicifolia. A specimen collected by Ludwig Preiss on 13 April 1839 from coastal sands in Perth was described as Banksia ilicifolia var integrifolia in Bentham's Flora Australiensis in 1870, but has not been recognised since. B. ilicifolia is variable in form, although the variations are not consistent enough to warrant recognising infraspecific taxa. Adult leaf margins can be entire or serrate (like holly), and can both be present on the one plant. Populations from the south coast have larger flowers and leaves, but some trees in the north of the range also have large flowers and leaves.

In 1891, Otto Kuntze, in his Revisio Generum Plantarum, rejected the generic name Banksia L.f., on the grounds that the name Banksia had previously been published in 1776 as Banksia J.R.Forst & G.Forst, referring to the genus now known as Pimelea. Kuntze proposed Sirmuellera as an alternative, referring to this species as Sirmuellera candolleana. This application of the principle of priority was largely ignored by Kuntze's contemporaries, and Banksia L.f. was formally conserved and Sirmuellera rejected in 1940.

=== Infrageneric placement ===
The unranked group Isostylis, with its one species, was reclassified as a section in the 1856 arrangement of Carl Meissner, and 1870 arrangement of George Bentham. In his 1981 revision of the genus, Alex George reclassified the group as a subgenus—Banksia subg. Isostylis—defined by the dome-shaped flower heads, with B. ilicifolia joined by newly described species B. cuneata and later B. oligantha. Banksia ilicifolia is the only common member of that subgenus; the two other species are rare and threatened, and are protected under the Environment Protection and Biodiversity Conservation Act 1999. Relationships between B. ilicifolia and the other members of B. subg. Isostylis still remain unclear. Although DNA studies found B. cuneata to be the most basal of the three species, a 2004 study of genetic divergence within the subgenus yielded both other possibilities: some analyses suggested B. ilicifolia as basal, while others suggested B. oligantha. Biogeographical factors suggest that B. ilicifolia would be the most basal of the three species: it occurs in the High Rainfall Zone where relictual species are most common, whereas the others are restricted to the Transitional Rainfall Zone, where more recently evolved species are most common.

A 1996 cladistic analysis of the genus by botanists Kevin Thiele and Pauline Ladiges assumed the status B. subg. Isostylis as a subgenus and earliest offshoot within Banksia, so George's placement of B. ilicifolia was retained in their arrangement. The placement of B. ilicifolia was unchanged in George's 1999 arrangement, and can be summarised as follows:

Banksia

B. subg. Banksia (3 sections, 11 series, 73 species, 11 subspecies, 14 varieties)
B. subg. Isostylis

B. ilicifolia
B. oligantha
B. cuneata

Since 1998, American botanist Austin Mast and co-authors have been publishing results of ongoing cladistic analyses of DNA sequence data for Banksia and Dryandra. Their analyses suggest a phylogeny that differs greatly from George's taxonomic arrangement. Banksia ilicifolia and B. oligantha form a clade, that is they are each other's closest relative, with Banksia cuneata resolving as the next closest relative, suggesting a monophyletic B. subg. Isostylis; but the clade appears fairly derived (that it, it evolved relatively recently), suggesting that B. subg. Isostylis may not merit subgeneric rank. Early in 2007, Mast and Thiele rearranged the genus Banksia by merging Dryandra into it, and published B. subg. Spathulatae for the taxa having spoon-shaped cotyledons; thus B. subg. Banksia was redefined as encompassing taxa lacking spoon-shaped cotyledons. They foreshadowed publishing a full arrangement once DNA sampling of Dryandra was complete. In the meantime, if Mast and Thiele's nomenclatural changes are taken as an interim arrangement, then B. ilicifolia is placed in B. subg. Banksia.

== Distribution and habitat ==
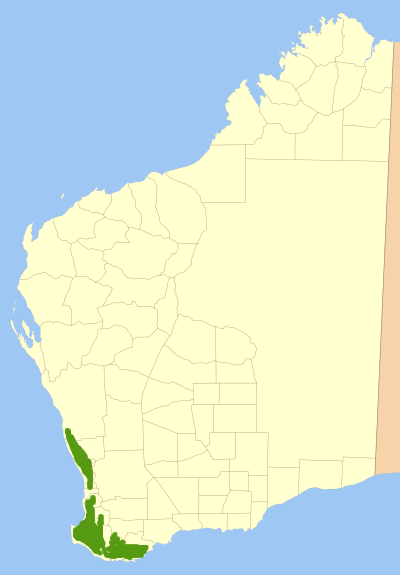
Distribution of Banksia ilicifolia

A relatively common species, the holly-leaved banksia is widely distributed within southwest Western Australia. It occurs within 70 km (43 mi) of the coast, from Mount Lesueur to Augusta, and then east to the Cordinup River east of Albany. In the Margaret River region, it grows on yellow sand plains behind the Leeuwin-Naturaliste Ridge. Almost all occurrences are to the west (seaward) side of the Darling Scarp, although there are two outlying populations – one near Collie east of Bunbury and the other in the Tonbridge-Lake Muir area near Manjimup. Along the south coast, there is one inland population at Sheepwash Nature Reserve near Narrikup northwest of Albany. The annual rainfall over its distribution ranges from 600 to 1,100 mm (24 to 43 in).

Banksia ilicifolia grows exclusively on sandy soils; its range ends where heavy soils are evident. It especially favours low-lying areas. It generally grows in open woodland alongside such trees as jarrah (Eucalyptus marginata), candlestick banksia (Banksia attenuata), firewood banksia (B. menziesii) and Western Australian Christmas tree (Nuytsia floribunda). Along the south coast, it grows in heath, sometimes forming stands with bull banksia (B. grandis).

The holly-leaved banksia gives its name to the Banksia ilicifolia woodlands ('community type 22'), a possibly threatened ecological community found in the Bassendean and Spearwood systems in the central Swan Coastal Plain north of Rockingham. These are low-lying areas which are seasonally waterlogged. The habitat is open woodland with an open understorey, and such trees as B. ilicifolia, B. attenuata and stout paperbark (Melaleuca preissiana).

Banksia ilicifolia is a component of the critically endangered Assemblage of Tumulus Springs (organic mound springs) of the Swan Coastal Plain community north of Perth, which is characterised by a permanently moist peaty soil. The dominant trees include Melaleuca preissiana, swamp banksia (B. littoralis) and flooded gum (Eucalyptus rudis), with understorey ferns such as bracken (Pteridium esculentum) and Cyclosorus interruptus, and shrubs swamp peppermint (Taxandria linearifolia) and Astartea fascicularis.

== Ecology ==
Banksia ilicifolia has been recorded as a source of nectar for the honey possum (Tarsipes rostratus) in winter to early summer (May to December), from field studies in the Scott National Park, replaced by Adenanthos meisneri in the summer. Several honeyeater species visit and pollinate Banksia ilicifolia. The western spinebill (Acanthorhynchus superciliosus) in particular prefers this species over other banksias.

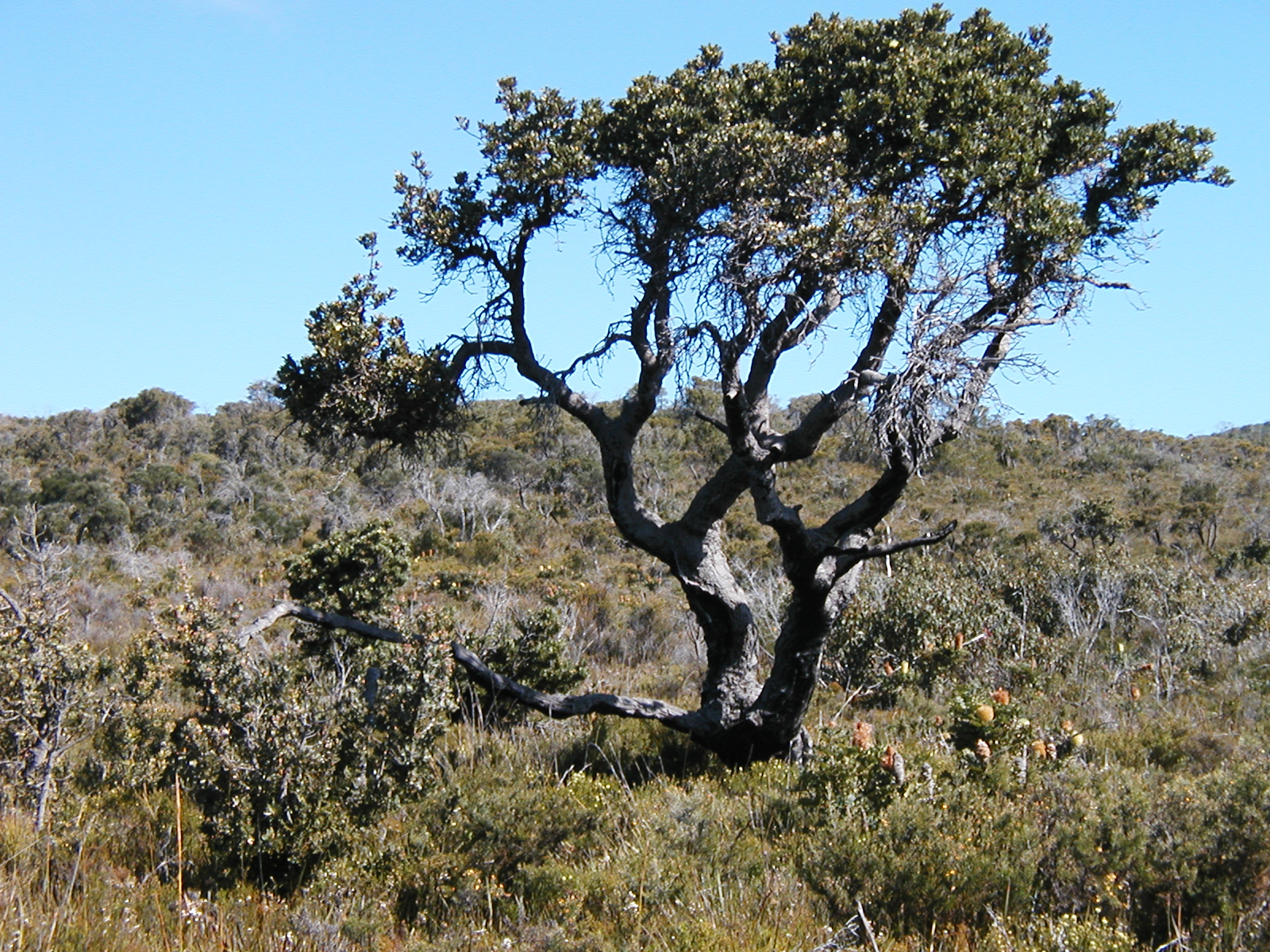
More shrubby form in heathland near Albany

A field study carried out at Jandakot Airport south of Perth and published in 1988 found that birds and insects overwhelmingly preferred visiting yellow-coloured flowerheads. The species recorded include several species of honeyeater, including the red wattlebird (Anthochaera carunculata), western wattlebird (A. lunulata), western spinebill, brown honeyeater (Lichmera indistincta), New Holland honeyeater (Phylidonyris novaehollandiae), white-cheeked honeyeater (P. nigra), singing honeyeater, (Gavicalis virescens), as well as the twenty-eight parrot (Barnardius zonarius semitorquatus), two species of native bee of the genus Leioproctus, a beetle of the genus Liparetrus, and ant species Iridomyrmex conifer. The yellow flowerheads are also the ones that bear the most nectar, and are greatly preferred by red wattlebirds.

An analysis of the invertebrate population in the canopy of Banksia woodland found that mites and ticks (Acari), beetles (Coleoptera) and ants, bees and wasps (Hymenoptera) predominated overall, with the three orders also common on B. ilicifolia, although outnumbered by thrips (Thysanoptera). More arthropods on B. ilicifolia might be related to a higher nutrient (potassium) level in the leaves. Lower overall numbers of invertebrates on Banksia species were thought to be related to the presence of insectivorous birds.

Hand-pollination experiments on wild populations near Perth showed that Banksia ilicifolia is self-compatible, although progeny produced have less vigour and seed production is reduced. Further experiments showed that seedlings of outcrossing with plants greater than 30 kilometres (19 mi) apart are more vigorous and adaptable, suggesting that plants breeding within small fragmented populations are subject to reduced vigour and genetic inbreeding.

Banksia ilicifolia regenerates after bushfire by regrowing from epicormic shoots under its bark. Follicles open and release seeds after several years. It is weakly serotinous, like eight other Banksia species, all of which tend to occur in Western Australia's southwestern corner. The other two species of the subgenus Isostylis are killed by fire and regenerate by seed.

All banksias have developed proteoid or cluster roots in response to the nutrient-poor conditions of Australian soils (particularly lacking in phosphorus). The plant develops masses of fine lateral roots which form a mat-like structure underneath the soil surface. These enable it to extract nutrients as efficiently possible out of the soil. A study of three co-occurring species in Banksia woodland in southwestern Australia—Banksia menziesii, B. attenuata and B. ilicifolia—found that all three develop fresh roots in September after winter rainfall, and that the bacteria populations associated with the root systems of B. menziesii differ from the other two, and that they also change depending on the age of the roots. Along with its shallow lateral roots, Banksia ilicifolia sinks one or more deep taproots seeking the water table. It is an obligate phreatophyte, that is, it is reliant upon accessing groundwater for its survival; it is more closely tied to the water table than the co-occurring B. menziesii and B. attenuata, and must remain in areas where the depth of the water table is less than 8 m (26 ft) below the surface. Recent falls of the water table on the Swan Coastal Plain from use of the Gnangara Mound aquifer for Perth's water supply combined with years of below average rainfall have seen the population and vigour of Banksia ilicifolia fall considerably (more so than other banksia species) since the mid-1960s.

Like many Western Australian banksias, Banksia ilicifolia has been shown to be highly sensitive to dieback from the soil-borne water mould Phytophthora cinnamomi. A study of Banksia attenuata woodland 400 km (250 mi) southeast of Perth across 16 years and following a wave of P. cinnamomi infestation showed that B. ilicifolia populations were present but significantly reduced in diseased areas. Specimens in coastal dune vegetation were reported killed by Armillaria luteobubalina, with mycelial sheaths of the fungus beneath the bark of the root collar.

== Cultivation ==
Rarely cultivated, Banksia ilicifolia requires a sunny position and sandy well-drained soil to do well. A slow-growing plant, it takes up to ten years to flower from seed. The glossy green foliage and long flowering period, combined with prominently displayed flowers give it horticultural potential, although its prickly foliage makes fallen leaves a problem if planted near lawns or walkways. Seeds do not require any treatment, and take 22 to 41 days to germinate. Difficulties in collection and low seed set make seed relatively expensive. Seeds are often eaten by insects before they can be collected.
