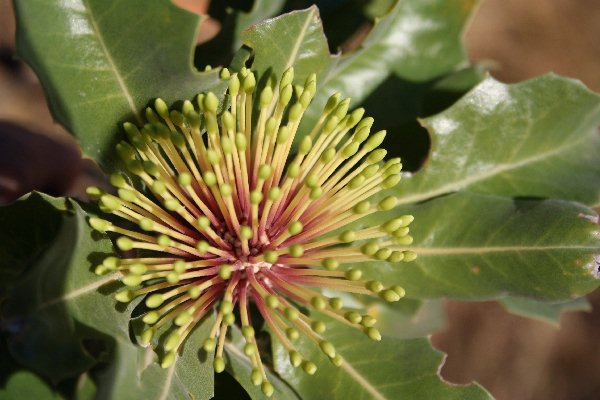

Scientific classification
- Kingdom: Plantae
- Clade: Tracheophytes
- Clade: Angiosperms
- Clade: Eudicots
- Order: Proteales
- Family: Proteaceae
- Genus: Banksia
- Subgenus: Banksia subg. Isostylis; R.Br.

Species
- Banksia cuneata; Banksia ilicifolia; Banksia oligantha

= Banksia subg. Isostylis =

Subgenus of plants from Western Australia

Banksia subg. Isostylis is a subgenus of Banksia. It contains three closely related species, all of which occur only in Southwest Western Australia. Members of subgenus Isostylis have dome-shaped flower heads that are superficially similar to those of B. ser. Dryandra, but structurally more like reduced versions of the "flower spikes" characteristic of most other Banksia taxa.

There are three species of Banksia subg. Isostylis, B. ilicifolia (holly-leaved banksia), B. cuneata (matchstick banksia) and B. oligantha (Wagin banksia). B. ilicifolia is widely distributed and relatively common, but the other two species are rare and threatened.

== Description ==
Banksia subg. Isostylis shares with B. ser. Dryandra the property of having compact, dome-shaped flower heads. Structurally, however, Isostylis flower heads are quite different from those of B. ser. Dryandra, having more in common with the erect flower spikes of other Banksia taxa. Specifically, Isostylis flower heads have an ovoid axis, suggestive of a greatly reduced flower spike, whereas Dryandra flower heads emerge from a flat receptacle. Furthermore, Isostylis has thick follicles with a woolly coating, whereas Dryandra follicles are thin and hairless; and the involucral, common and floral bracts of Isostylis are unlike those of Dryandra.

The Isostylis species are all upright shrubs or trees, with a single trunk. They generally have serrate leaves, although in rare cases B. ilicifolia may have entire leaves.

== Taxonomy ==
=== Taxonomic history ===
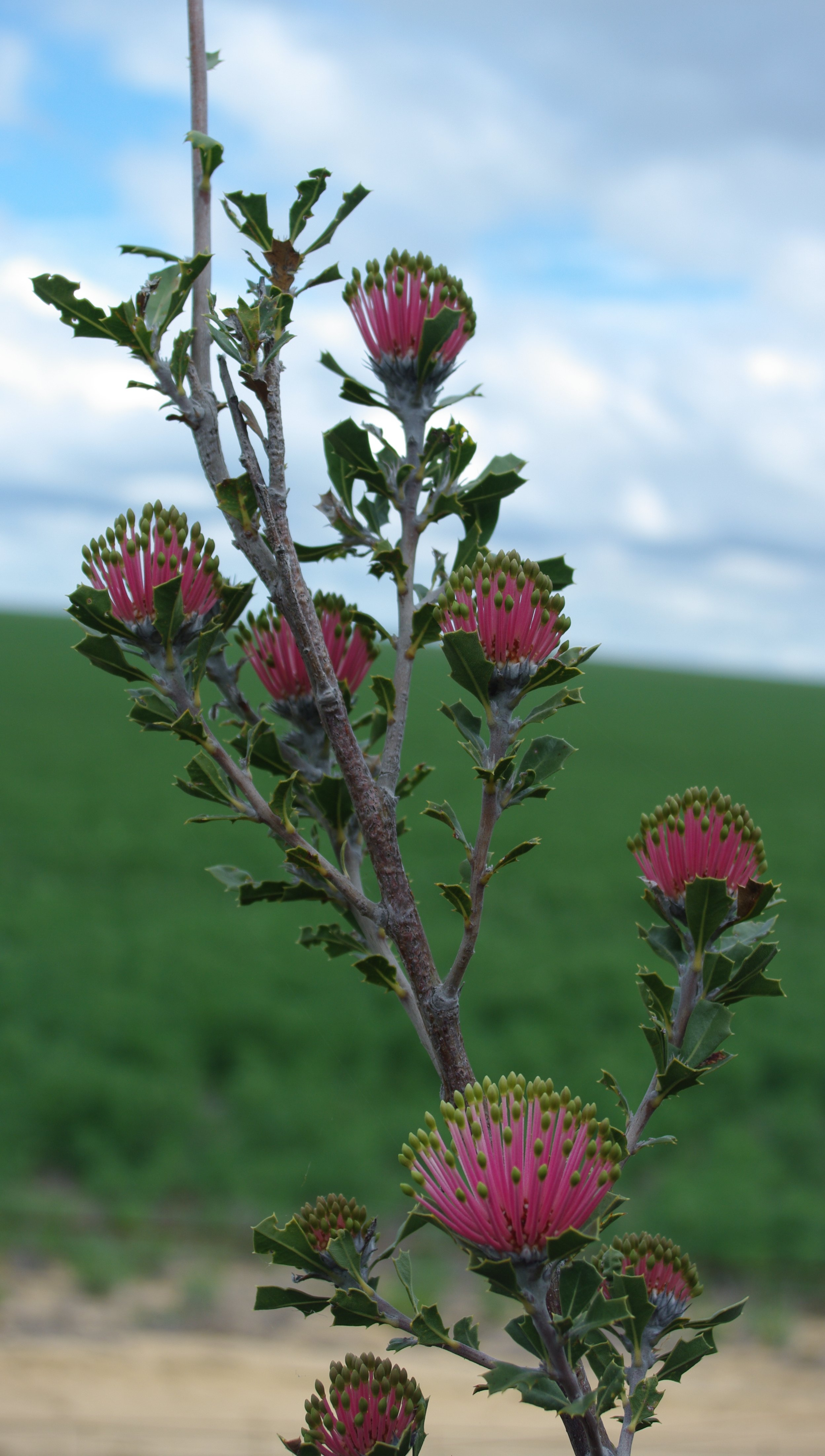
Branch of B. cuneata

Banksia subg. Isostylis was first published by Robert Brown in his 1810 Prodromus Florae Novae Hollandiae et Insulae Van Diemen; thus its full name, with author citation, is Banksia subg. Isostylis R.Br. Brown's arrangement was the first infrageneric arrangement of Banksia, making B. subg. Isostylis Banksia's first infrageneric taxon. Brown erected B. subg. Isostylis to contain B. ilicifolia, which was then the only known Banksia with a dome-shaped inflorescence. He did not explicitly name a type species for the subgenus, but B. ilicifolia is treated as the type because it was the only member when the subgenus was published.

Twenty years later, Brown issued a supplement to his Prodromus entitled Supplementum Primum Prodromi Florae Novae Hollandiae; another nine Banksia species were published, but there was no change to the 1810 arrangement, and no new Isostylis species.

In 1846, Édouard Spach promoted B. subg. Isostylis to genus rank in his Histoire Naturelle des Vegetaux: Phanerogames. This was not accepted, and Isostylis (R.Br.) Spach is now considered a nomenclatural synonym of B. subg. Isostylis.

When Carl Meissner published his arrangement of Banksia in 1856, he demoted both of Brown's subgenera to sectional rank, maintaining B. sect. Isostylis (R.Br.) Meisn. as a monospecific taxon containing only B. ilicifolia. Meissner's rank and circumscription of Isostylis was retained by George Bentham in his 1870 arrangement for Flora Australiensis, but Bentham also published a putative variety of B. ilicifolia, B. i. var. integrifolia, based on specimens collected by Ludwig Preiss near the Swan River in Western Australia. This was later overturned.

In 1905, James Britten challenged the genus name Banksia, on the grounds that Banksia J.R.Forst & G.Forst had precedent over Banksia L.f. Britten adopted the name Isostylis for the entire genus, republishing the names Isostylis dentata (L.f.) Britten for B. dentata (tropical banksia), Isostylis ericifolia (L.f.) Britten for B. ericifolia (heath-leaved banksia), Isostylis integrifolia (L.f.) Britten for B. integrifolia (coast banksia) and Isostylis serrata (L.f.) Britten for B. serrata (saw banksia). This challenge failed, Banksia L.f. was eventually conserved, and his four names are now considered taxonomic synonyms of their respective names under Banksia L.f. None of them are considered members of Isostylis.

The next change to Isostylis came in 1981, when Alex George promoted it back to subgenus rank, and published a second species, B. cuneata. In discussing the subgenus, George commented that there had been calls to transfer Isostylis into Dryandra, which was then a distinct genus. He argued, however, that the similarities between Isostylis and Dryandra were largely superficial, whereas the similarities with Banksia were much more important taxonomically. His conclusion was that the taxon should remain in Banksia, although he did not rule out promoting it into a separate genus. A third B. subg. Isostylis species, B. oligantha, was published by George in 1988.

In 1996, Kevin Thiele and Pauline Ladiges published a revised arrangement based on a cladistic analysis of morphological characters of Banksia. They took up the question of an affinity of Isostylis with Dryandra, finding George's arguments unconvincing but failing to find any further evidence for or against Isostylis's placement within Banksia. They eventually accepted both of George's subgenera, using each as an outgroup in the analysis of the other. Thus their analysis yielded no information about the circumscription and placement of Isostylis, and their arrangement maintained Isostylis as a subgenus.

Thiele and Ladiges' arrangement was not accepted by George, and was largely discarded by him in his 1999 arrangement. The placement and circumscription of B. subg. Isostylis was unaffected and can be summarised as follows:

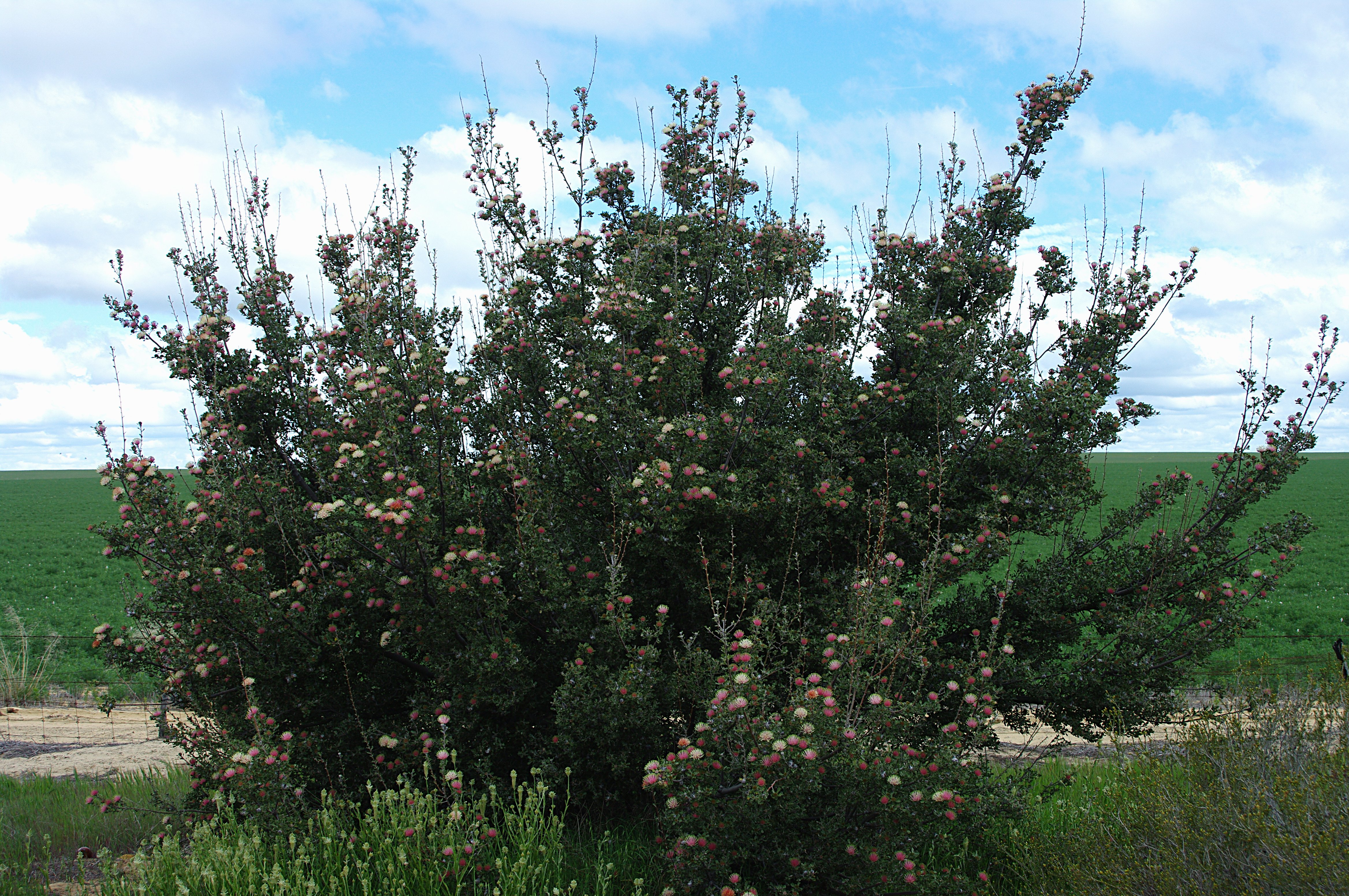
B. cuneata grows as a large shrub, up to three metres in height.

Banksia

B. subg. Banksia (3 sections, 11 series, 73 species, 11 subspecies, 14 varieties)
B. subg. Isostylis

B. ilicifolia
B. oligantha
B. cuneata

Since 1998, Austin Mast has been publishing results of ongoing cladistic analyses of DNA sequence data for the subtribe Banksiinae. His analyses has provided compelling evidence for the paraphyly of Banksia with respect to Dryandra, and suggest an overall phylogeny that is very greatly different from George's arrangement. Mast's results clearly recognise Isostylis as a distinct clade, but place it in a fairly recent position, within a clade that also contains B. elegans (Elegant Banksia) and B. attenuata (Candlestick Banksia). It falls a substantial distance from Dryandra, suggesting that similarities between those two groups are indeed superficial.

Early in 2007, Mast and Thiele initiated a rearrangement of Banksia by merging Dryandra into it, and publishing B. subg. Spathulatae for the species having spoon-shaped cotyledons. They foreshadowed publishing a full arrangement once DNA sampling of Dryandra was complete; in the meantime, B. subg. Isostylis has been set aside. If maintained at all in Mast and Thiele's forthcoming arrangement, it will be at a lesser rank than subgenus.

Relationships within B. subg. Isostylis still remain unclear. Though Mast's studies found B. cuneata to be sister to the other two species, a 2004 study of genetic divergence within the subgenus yielded both other possibilities: some analyses suggested B. ilicifolia is sister to the other two species, while others suggested that B. oligantha is sister to the clade of B. ilicifolia and B. cuneata. Further complicating the situation is the existence of a population of B. cuneata having both genetic and phenetic affinities with B. oligantha. The origin of this population is unknown. It might have arisen through hybridisation, or it may be a transitional or even ancestral form. Finally, biogeographical factors suggest that B. ilicifolia would be sister to the remaining two species: it occurs in the High Rainfall Zone where relictual species are most common, whereas the others are restricted to the Transitional Rainfall Zone, where more recently evolved species are most common.

== Distribution ==
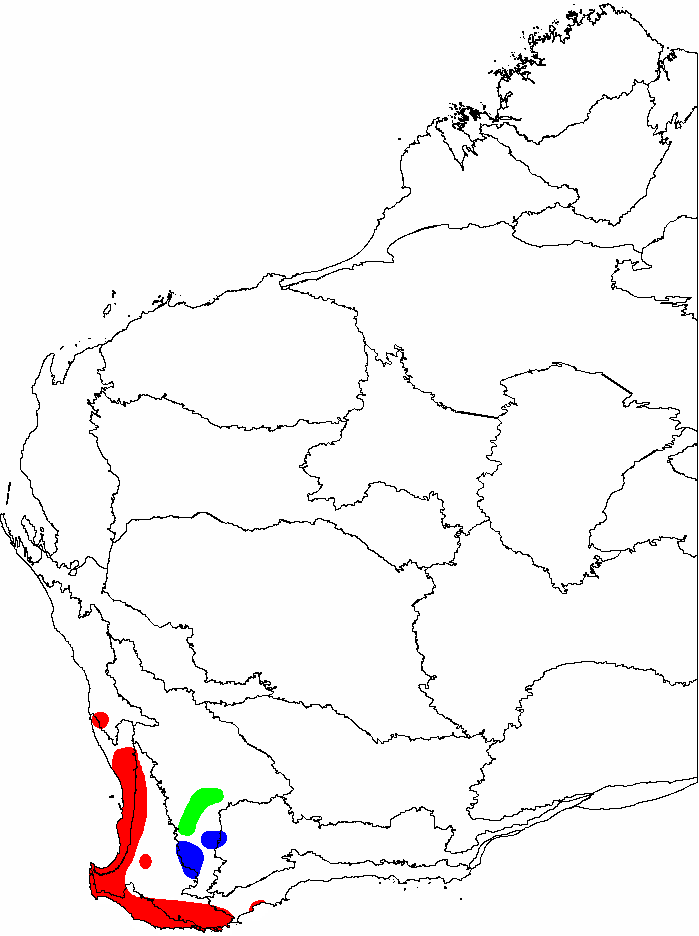
Distribution of the three B. subg.Isostylis species: B. ilicifolia (red), B. cuneata (green), and B. oligantha (blue)

Species of B. subg. Isostylis occur only in Western Australia's South West Botanical Province. B. ilicifolia is widespread within 70 kilometres of the coast from Mount Lesueur in the north, south to Cape Leeuwin and east to Albany. The other two species occur further inland, and have quite limited distributions. B. cuneata occurs Brookton and Bruce Rock in the Avon Wheatbelt biogeographic region; while B. oligantha occurs slightly further south, in the vicinity of Wagin.

== Ecology ==
Ecologically, B. subg. Isostylis is similar to other Banksias. As with other Banksia taxa, all three species have proteoid roots, roots with dense clusters of short lateral rootlets that form a mat in the soil just below the leaf litter. These roots are particularly efficient at absorbing nutrients from nutrient-poor soils, such as the phosphorus-deficient native soils of Australia. They lack a lignotuber, so shrubs are killed by bushfire; mature trees of B. ilicifolia have a limited ability to resprout from epicormic buds on the trunk. But like all Banksias they release their aerial seed bank following a bushfire. This adaptation, known as serotiny, ensures the rapid regeneration of populations killed by fire.

B. cuneata and B. oligantha have been declared rare under both Western Australia's Wildlife Conservation Act 1950, and the federal Environment Protection and Biodiversity Conservation Act 1999. Threats include loss of habitat, Phytophthora cinnamomi dieback, and grazing on seedlings by feral rabbits.

== Cultivation ==
None of the B. subg. Isostylis species are popular in cultivation. The two rare species are virtually unknown in cultivation. B. ilicifolia is better known, but its usefulness as an amenity plant is limited by the fact that it has very prickly leaves.
