= Seed bank (disambiguation) =

A seed bank is a repository of preserved seeds.

Seed bank may also refer to:

- The store of viable plant seed in an ecosystem; for example:
  - Soil seed bank, the viable seed present in the soil
  - Canopy seed bank, the viable seed stored in the canopy of a serotinous tree or shrub
