= Julia Harris =

Julia Harris may refer to:

- Julia Collier Harris (1885–1967), American writer and journalist
- Julia Harris May (1833–1912), American poet and teacher
- Julia Wells or Julia Susannah Harris (1842–1911), Australian botanical collector

== See also ==
- Julie Harris (disambiguation)
