= Julie Harris (disambiguation) =

Julie Harris (1925–2013) was an American actress

Julie Harris may also refer to:

- Julie Harris (costume designer) (1921–2015), British costume designer
- Julie Harris (cricketer) (born 1960), New Zealand cricketer
- Julie M. Harris (born 1967), vision scientist and academic
- Patsy Palmer (born 1972), English actress born Julie Anne Harris

== See also ==
- Julia Harris (disambiguation)
- JuJu Harris (writer) (Juliet Harris), American cookbook author, culinary educator and food access activist
