= JuJu Harris =

JuJu Harris may refer to:

- JuJu Harris (writer), American cookbook author, culinary educator, and food access activist
- Juju Harris (footballer), American-born footballer for Brazil
