= Short-nosed snake =

Conservation status
- Least Concern (IUCN 3.1)

Scientific classification
- Kingdom: Animalia
- Phylum: Chordata
- Class: Reptilia
- Order: Squamata
- Suborder: Serpentes
- Family: Elapidae
- Genus: Elapognathus
- Species: E. minor

Binomial name
- Elapognathus minor (Günther, 1863)
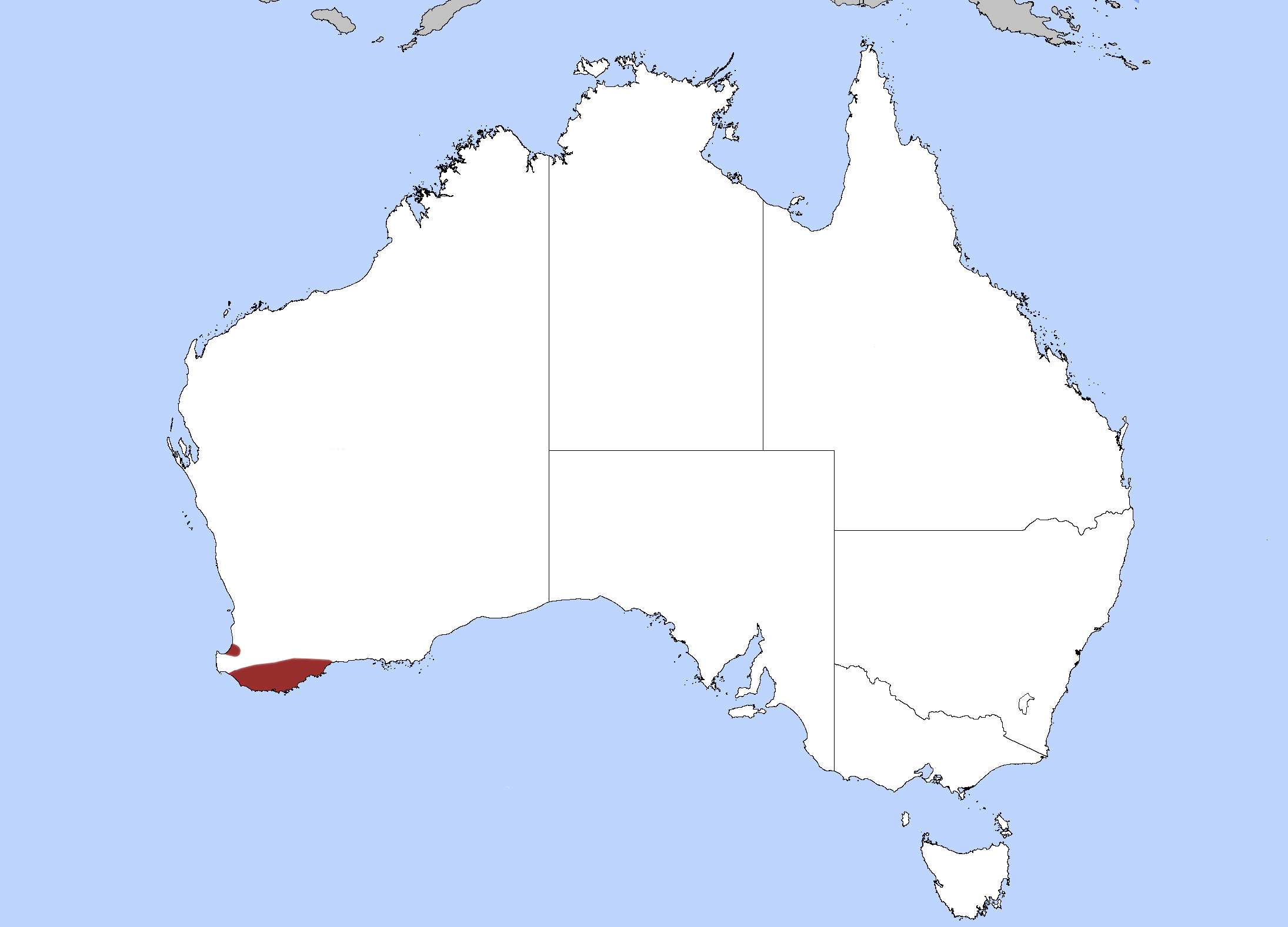
- Distribution of the short-nosed snake

Synonyms
- Hoplocephalus minor Günther, 1863; Elapognathus minor — Boulenger, 1896; Notechis minor — Storr, 1982; Elapognathus minor — Cogger, 1983

Species of snake

The short-nosed snake (Elapognathus minor) is a species of venomous snake in the family Elapidae. The species is endemic to Australia. Short-nosed snakes are endemic to swamplands and coastlands in the southwest of Western Australia, where they shelter in nests of stick ants (Iridomyrmex conifer), as well as dense rushes and reed tussocks. Short-nosed snakes are known to prey on small skinks mainly from the skink genus hemiergis, and small species of frogs.
