= Bradyspory =

Gradual release of seed

Bradyspory is the gradual release of seed from a cone or fruit over a long period of time, as opposed to tachyspory, the more-or-less immediate release of seed as soon as they have matured. Bradyspory may occur because seed release is spontaneous but very gradual, or because seed release does not occur until triggered to do so by some environmental event. The latter case is termed serotiny.

The term is seldom used, and some of the more recent literature uses the term bradychory instead.
