= Tachyspory =

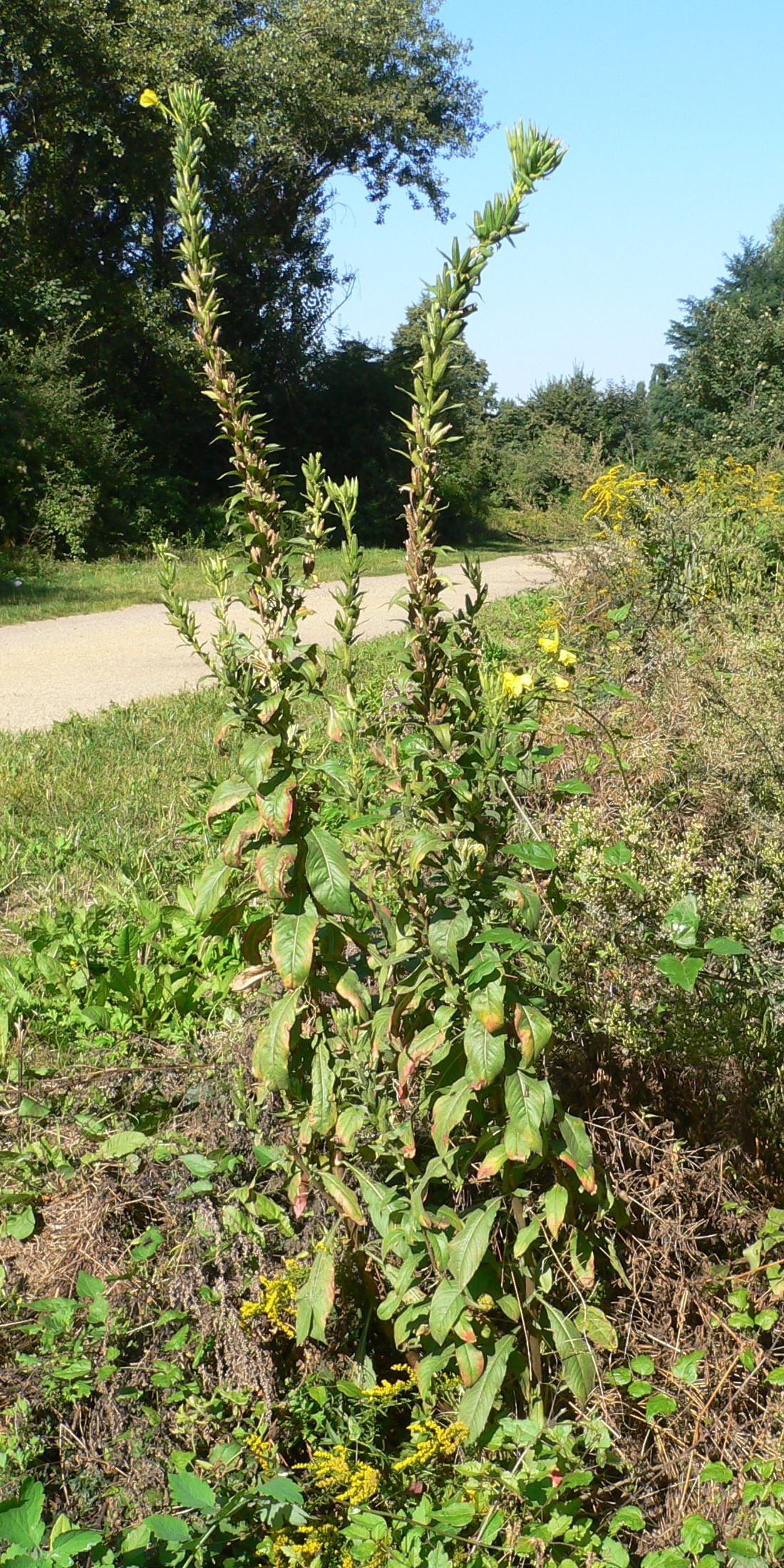
Oenothera sp. that experiences tachyspory

Tachyspory is a form of dehiscence where seed is rapidly released from a cone or fruit upon maturity, as opposed to bradyspory, the gradual release of seed over time. It is a word used in botany to describe seed dispersal.

"Tachy" is a word-forming element meaning "rapid, swift, fast", from Latinized comb. form of Greek takhy "swift".
