= Elapognathus =

Scientific classification
- Kingdom: Animalia
- Phylum: Chordata
- Class: Reptilia
- Order: Squamata
- Suborder: Serpentes
- Family: Elapidae
- Subfamily: Hydrophiinae
- Genus: Elapognathus; Boulenger, 1896

Genus of snakes

Elapognathus is a genus of snakes of the family Elapidae.

== Species ==
- Elapognathus coronatus (Schlegel, 1837) – crowned snake
- Elapognathus minor (Günther, 1863) – short-nosed snake, little brown snake
