= Julia Wells =

Australian botanical collector

Julia Susannah Harris née Wells (5 August 1842 – 8 July 1911) is notable for having collected some significant botanical specimens in what is now the wheatbelt region of Western Australia. Amongst her collections is the type specimen of the endangered Acacia volubilis; the type specimen of the rare Acacia anarthros, and the earliest known collection of Banksia cuneata.

All of Wells' specimens are recorded as having been collected at "Boxvale". This is now a lost toponym; according to Bruce Maslin it was "somewhere E of York, perhaps near the Cubbine Hills between Cunderdin and Quairading". Wells' specimens are also undated, but are assumed to have been made in the 1870s or before, since they are attributed to her under the maiden name, and she married in 1880.

== Personal Life & Death ==
Little is known of her personal life. The daughter of Richard Wells, the first manager of the Western Australian Bank, she married Robert Harris in the Congregational Church, East Melbourne, Victoria in 1880. She had a daughter, Florence S. Harris, and died on 8 July 1911 at Perth Public Hospital, aged 68.
