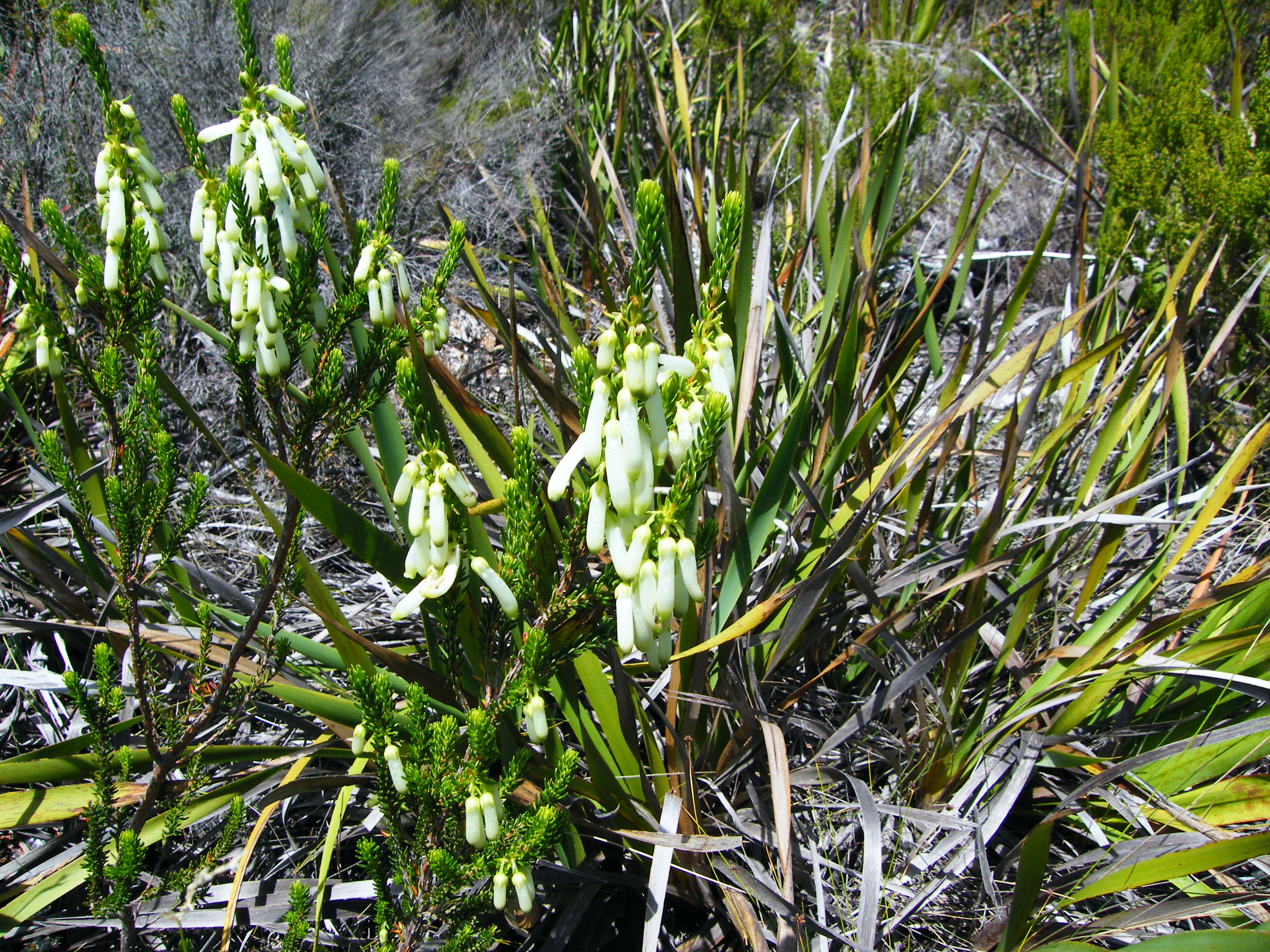

Scientific classification
- Kingdom: Plantae
- Clade: Tracheophytes
- Clade: Angiosperms
- Clade: Eudicots
- Clade: Asterids
- Order: Ericales
- Family: Ericaceae
- Genus: Erica
- Species: E. sessiliflora

Binomial name
- Erica sessiliflora L.f.

Synonyms
- Erica cephalotes Willd. ex Steud.; Erica claviflora Salisb.; Erica favosa Salisb.; Erica sceptriformis Salisb.; Erica sessiliflora Andrews; Erica spicata Thunb.; Ericoides spicatum (Thunb.) Kuntze; Syringodea claviflora (Salisb.) G.Don; Syringodea sceptriformis (Salisb.) G.Don; Syringodea sessiliflora (L.f.) D.Don; Syringodea spicata (Thunb.) G.Don

= Erica sessiliflora =

Species of flowering plant

Erica sessiliflora is a plant belonging to the genus Erica. The species is endemic to the Western Cape.
