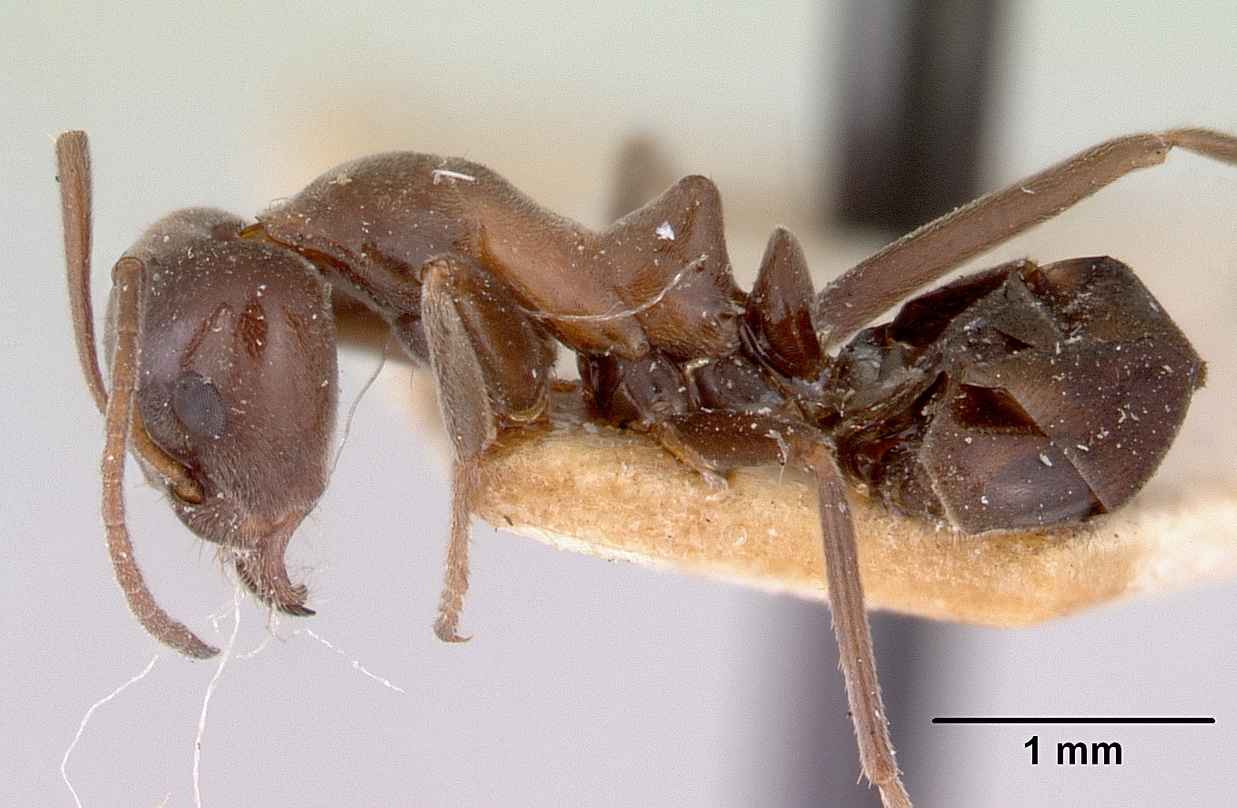

Scientific classification
- Kingdom: Animalia
- Phylum: Arthropoda
- Class: Insecta
- Order: Hymenoptera
- Family: Formicidae
- Subfamily: Dolichoderinae
- Genus: Iridomyrmex
- Species: I. conifer

Binomial name
- Iridomyrmex conifer Forel, 1902

= Iridomyrmex conifer =

Species of ant

Iridomyrmex conifer is a species of ant in the genus Iridomyrmex. Endemic to Australia, it was described by Auguste-Henri Forel in 1902.
