= JuJu Harris (writer) =

American food-access activist and author

Juju Harris
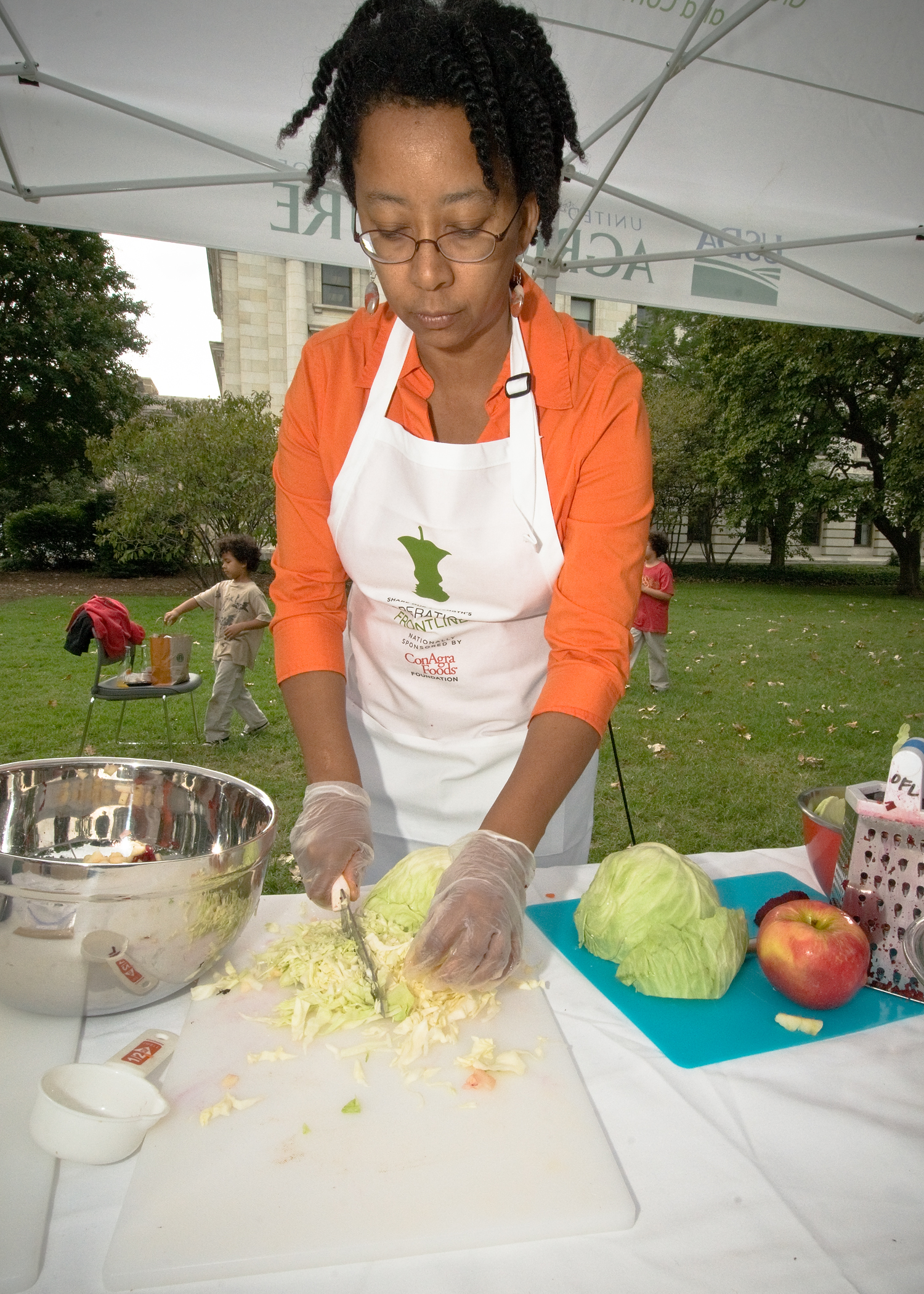
- Harris in 2009
- Born: Juliet Harris; Oakland, California, U.S.
- Occupation: Cookbook author / Educator / Activist
- Notable work: Healthy & Homemade: Eating Well on a Budget (2007); The Arcadia Mobile Market Seasonal Cookbook (2014)

Juliet "JuJu" Harris is an American cookbook author, culinary educator, and food access activist.

She is the author of Healthy & Homemade: Eating Well on a Budget and the Arcadia Mobile Market Seasonal Cookbook and the owner of Nana Juju Rocks Food.

== Early life and education ==
Harris was born in Oakland, California to a mother from Virginia. She worked as a firefighter, lumberjack, trail maintenance worker, and nanny in the Oakland area before joining the Peace Corps at age 32. During her time with the Peace Corps, she worked with farmers in Paraguay. After returning to the United States, Harris qualified for the US government Special Supplemental Nutrition Program for Women, Infants, and Children (WIC) program while she was the parent to small children. She then began learning to cook and garden to help stretch the food from WIC, and teaching others to cook.

== Career ==
As of 2015, she worked as culinary educator for Arcadia Center for Sustainable Food and Agriculture, a nonprofit organization in Washington, DC.

In 2014, Harris wrote the Arcadia Mobile Market Seasonal Cookbook, which provides tips on creating high-quality meals on a budget. Customers of the Mobile Market receiving nutrition assistance were also eligible to receive a free copy of a cookbook. She wrote and published Healthy and Homemade: Eating Well on a Budget in 2017.

In addition to her work as an author and food educator, Harris worked as a birth and postpartum doula. Her work as an activist includes advocating for extending the Family and Medical Leave Act.

Harris founded her food and organic garden design business Nana Juju Rocks Food.

In 2015, Harris was recognized in a video feature sponsored by a CarMax, The Bright Side, for her contributions as an innovator who combats food insecurity and food deserts.

== Books ==
- Healthy & Homemade: Eating Well on a Budget, 2017, ISBN 978-0-578-38211-1
- Arcadia Mobile Market Seasonal Cookbook, 2014

== Personal life ==
Harris is a mother and experienced postpartum syndrome. She is married to her husband, who she met while working for the Peace Corps.
