= Serotiny =

Seed release in response to environment

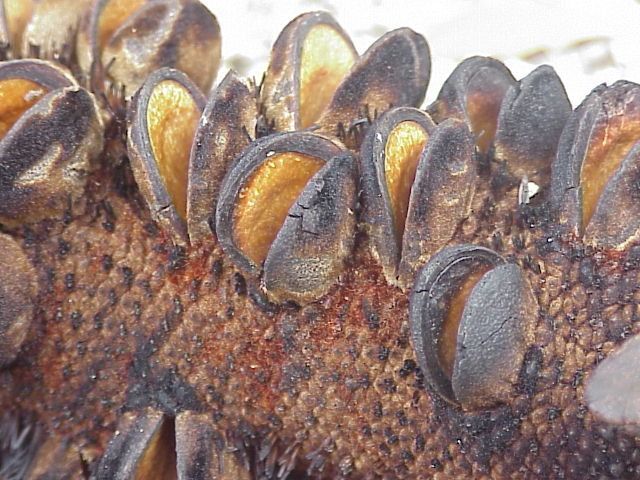
Fire has caused minimal damage to this Banksia serrata (saw banksia) fruiting structure, but has triggered the opening of the follicles and the release of seed.

Serotiny in botany simply means 'following' or 'later'.

In the case of serotinous flowers, it means flowers which grow following the growth of leaves, or even more simply, flowering later in the season than is typical with allied species. Having serotinous leaves is also possible, these follow the flowering.

Serotiny is contrasted with coetany. Coetaneous flowers or leaves appear together with each other.

In the case of serotinous fruit, the term is used in the more general sense of plants that release their seed over a long period of time, irrespective of whether release is spontaneous; in this sense the term is synonymous with bradyspory.

In the case of certain Australian, North American, South African or Californian plants which grow in areas subjected to regular wildfires, serotinous fruit can also mean an ecological adaptation exhibited by some seed plants, in which seed release occurs in response to an environmental trigger, rather than spontaneously at seed maturation. The most common and best studied trigger is fire, and the term serotiny is used to refer to this specific case.

Possible triggers include:

- Death of the parent plant or branch (necriscence)
- Wetting (hygriscence)
- Warming by the sun (soliscence)
- Drying atmospheric conditions (xeriscence)
- Fire (pyriscence) – this is the most common and best studied case, and the term serotiny is often used where pyriscence is intended.
- Fire followed by wetting (pyrohydriscence)

Some plants may respond to more than one of these triggers. For example, Pinus halepensis exhibits primarily fire-mediated serotiny, but responds weakly to drying atmospheric conditions. Similarly, Sierras sequoias and some Banksia species are strongly serotinous with respect to fire, but also release some seed in response to plant or branch death.

Serotiny can occur in various degrees. Plants that retain all of their seed indefinitely in the absence of a trigger event are strongly serotinous. Plants that eventually release some of their seed spontaneously in the absence of a trigger are weakly serotinous. Finally, some plants release all of their seed spontaneously after a period of seed storage, but the occurrence of a trigger event curtails the seed storage period, causing all seed to be released immediately; such plants are essentially non-serotinous, but may be termed facultatively serotinous.

== Pyriscence ==
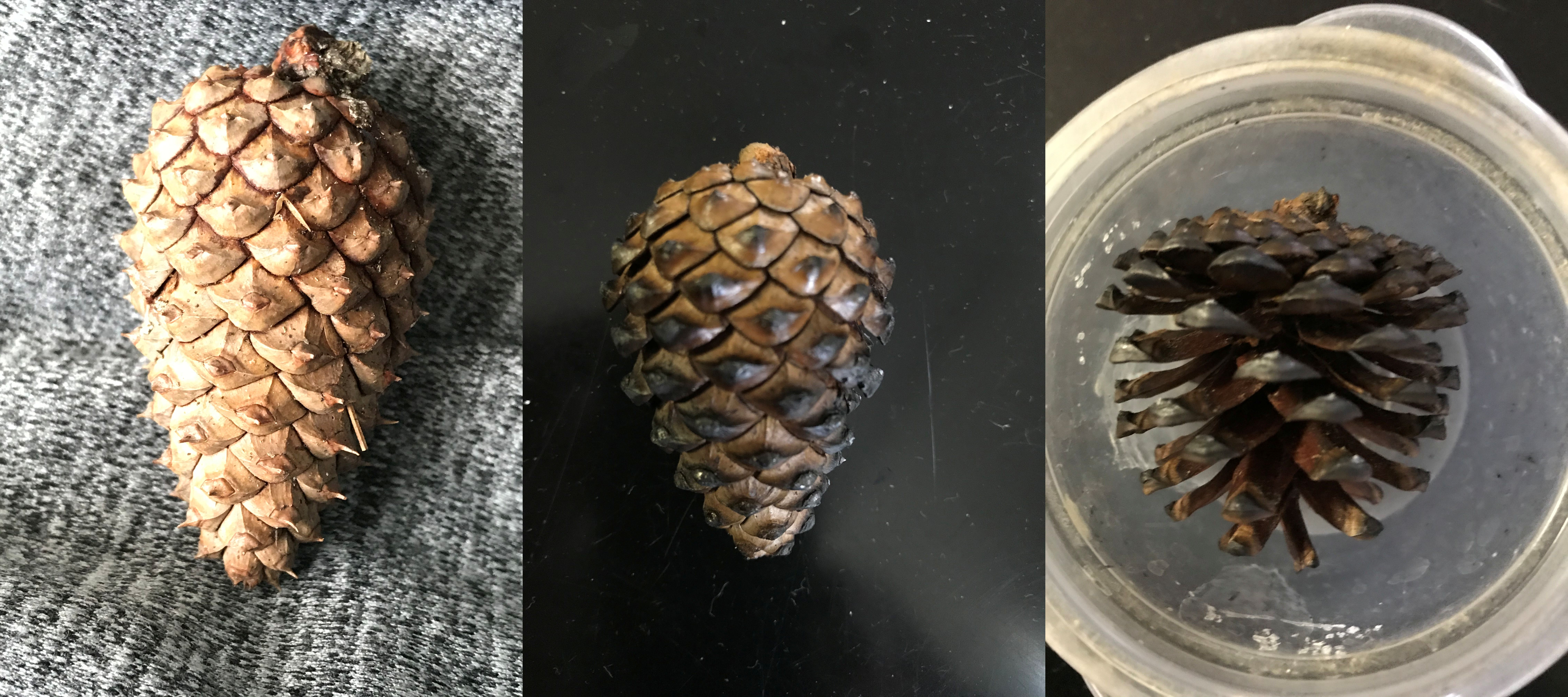
Pitch pine cones open when exposed to fire. Left: before; centre: immediately after; right: 24 hours later

In the Southern Hemisphere, fire-mediated serotiny, pyriscence, is found in angiosperms in fire-prone parts of Australia and South Africa. It is extremely common in the Proteaceae of these areas, and also occurs in other taxa, such as Eucalyptus (Myrtaceae) and even exceptionally in Erica sessiliflora (Ericaceae). In the Northern Hemisphere, it is found in a range of conifer taxa, including species of Pinus, Cupressus, Sequoiadendron, and more rarely Picea.

Since even non-serotinous cones and woody fruits can provide protection from the heat of fire, the key adaptation of fire-induced serotiny is seed storage in a canopy seed bank, which can be released by fire. The fire-release mechanism is commonly a resin that seals the fruit or cone scales shut, but which melts when heated. This mechanism is refined in some Banksia by the presence inside the follicle of a winged seed separator which blocks the opening, preventing the seed from falling out. Thus, the follicles open after fire, but seed release does not occur. As the cone dries, wetting by rain or humidity causes the cone scales to expand and reflex, promoting seed release. The seed separator thus acts as a lever against the seeds, gradually prying them out of the follicle over the course of one or more wet–dry cycles. The effect of this adaptation is to ensure that seed release occurs not in response to fire, but in response to the onset of rains following fire.

The relative importance of pyriscence can vary among populations of the same plant species. For example, North American populations of lodgepole pine (Pinus contorta) can vary from being highly serotinous to having no serotiny at all, opening annually to release seed. Different levels of cone serotiny have been linked to variations in the local fire regime: areas that experience more frequent crown-fire tend to have high rates of pyriscence, while areas with infrequent crown-fire have low levels. Herbivory of lodgepole pines can make pyriscence less advantageous in a population. Red squirrels (Sciurus vulgaris) and red crossbills (Loxia curvirostra) eat seeds, and so serotinous cones, which last in the canopy longer, are more likely to be chosen. Serotiny occurs less frequently in areas where this seed predation is common.

Pyriscence can be understood as an adaptation to an environment in which fires are regular and in which post-fire environments offer the best germination and seedling survival rates. In Australia, for example, pyriscence occurs in areas that not only are prone to regular fires but also possess oligotrophic soils and a seasonally dry climate. This results in intense competition for nutrients and moisture, leading to very low seedling survival rates. The passage of fire, however, reduces competition by clearing out undergrowth, and results in an ash bed that temporarily increases soil nutrition; thus the survival rates of post-fire seedlings is greatly increased. Releasing a large number of seeds at once, rather than gradually, increases the possibility that some of those seeds will escape predation. Similar pressures apply in Northern Hemisphere conifer forests, but in this case there is the further issue of allelopathic leaf litter, which suppresses seed germination. Fire clears out this litter, eliminating this obstacle to germination.

Pyriscence can function primarily through two active mechanisms of smoke- or heatshock-induced germination. Studies on invasive species success in fire-prone environments have indicated that invasive species of mediterranean environments tend to employ fire-mediated germination. Interestingly, in these environments there is a distinction between average invasive herbaceous and ligneous plant life strategies, with ligneous plants highly associated with heat shock based pyriscence and herbaceous plants significantly associated with smoke triggered germination.

== Evolution ==
Serotinous adaptations occur in at least 530 species in 40 genera, in multiple (paraphyletic) lineages. Serotiny likely evolved separately in these species, but may in some cases have been lost by the related non-serotinous species.

In the genus Pinus, serotiny likely evolved because of the atmospheric conditions during the Cretaceous period. The atmosphere during the Cretaceous had higher oxygen and carbon dioxide levels than our atmosphere. Fire occurred more frequently than it does currently, and plant growth was high enough to create an abundance of flammable material. Many Pinus species adapted to this fire-prone environment with serotinous pine cones.

A set of conditions must be met in order for long-term seed storage to be evolutionarily viable for a plant:

- The plant must be phylogenetically able (pre-adapted) to develop the necessary reproductive structures
- The seeds must remain viable until cued to release
- Seed release must be cued by a trigger that indicates environmental conditions that are favorable to germination
- The cue must occur on an average timescale that is within the reproductive lifespan of the plant
- The plant must have the capacity and opportunity to produce enough seeds prior to release to ensure population replacement
- Serotiny must be heritable
