= Canopy seed bank =

Viable seeds present on plants within plant communities

Canopy seed banks are the community aggregates of plant seed that are stored in the crown portion of plants, known as the canopy. Natural seed banks can be categorized according to their location and the ecological functions they serve. The primary types include soil seed banks, which are found in terrestrial environments; wetland seed banks, located in aquatic habitats; and canopy seed banks, present in the upper layers of forest ecosystems. Each type of seed contributes uniquely to plant biodiversity, ecosystem resilience and human well-being. Also, they are unique in the way they retain their seed. For example, in canopy seed banks or aerial seed banks, the seeds are stored in the canopies of trees and plants.

== Description ==
Plants with canopy seed banks store their seeds in branches, pods, and other structures. Ecological disturbances in the ecosystem have led some plants to develop adaptive strategies such as retaining seeds and delaying seed release. The ability of these plants to store seeds long-term is one of the main adaptation methods they have developed, particularly against recurrent fires. Additionally, after a disturbance (i.e., fire) has occurred, the plant species will release the retained seeds onto the ground to germinate according to certain seasonal conditions that signal the appropriate time for seedling establishment. This process is particularly important for sustainable management and conservation of plant biodiversity. Maternal plants with the ability to maintain canopy seed banks actively store and protect their seeds at an elevated position within the canopy. This strategic placement ensures that, in the event of severe disturbances such as wildfires which may result in the death of some or all adult plants, the seeds are well-positioned for dispersal, thereby preserving the genetic diversity of the species.

The soil seed banks and seeds found on forest floors are less protected compared to the canopy seed banks, particularly during disturbances. In contrast, seeds stored in the canopy are protected both before and during disturbances. During these severe disturbances, the seed banks within the canopy are expected to be triggered and dispersed widely. After such disturbances, these seeds can be released into the ground, thereby serving as a reliable source for the establishment of new seedlings. This mechanism serves as a critical survival strategy, enabling the species to endure and regenerate following significant environmental challenges and ensure population restoration.

=== Serotiny ===
Canopy seed banks are often associated with serotinous species. The ability of some plant species to retain seeds in protective structures and delay the release of mature seeds is known as serotiny. These plant species can store seeds in closed fruits or cones for days to decades until environmental changes are triggered during events such as wildfires and proper growing conditions. After a year or two, the widely dispersed seed starts the germination process and regeneration of species affected in the disturbed areas. These plant species are often found in fire-prone environments such as those of Proteaceae species in Australia, dioecious species in South Africa and pine species in the US.

The serotiny levels of species found in specific locations are related to the fire history of those areas as fire is one the most common disturbances faced by plants. These plant species can retain seeds within their canopy for extended periods, eventually leading to the formation of canopy seed banks. Other factors aside from fire disturbances that affect the serotiny levels in plant species include the age of plants, soil quality, environmental stress and season changes in the environment.

== Methods of seed bank detection ==
Research studies, aimed at determining the existence and characteristics of canopy seed banks in plants typically employ a variety of methods, including:

1. Plant species and sample site selection: This involves collecting samples from the canopy of the plant species across various locations of the sample site
2. Seed counting: After collecting the seed from each cone of the sample selected, the number of seeds is counted to calculate the baseline seed density.
3. Density calculation: The density of the canopy is calculated as the total number of seeds in the plot divided by the measured canopy area.
4. Extrapolation: Using the data gathered from the samples collected, the seed density of the selected site can be extrapolated to estimate the seed bank size for the entire canopy.
5. Statistical analysis: Statistical methods are used to analyse the data, compare the means, and determine the seed bank of estimates of plants. These statistical methods include t-test distribution, one-way analysis of variance (ANOVA) and regression modelling.

== Significance ==
Several authors have highlighted the significance of canopy seed bank and their critical roles in ecosystem dynamics, which include preserving crop diversity, protecting the environment from the impacts of climate change, safeguarding against natural and man-made disasters, shielding plants from infectious and destructive diseases, providing seeds for research purposes and ensuring low predation and competition for their species.
