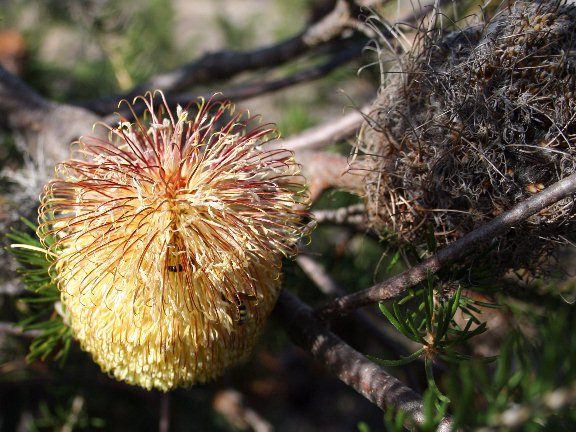

Scientific classification
- Kingdom: Plantae
- Clade: Embryophytes
- Clade: Tracheophytes
- Clade: Spermatophytes
- Clade: Angiosperms
- Clade: Eudicots
- Order: Proteales
- Family: Proteaceae
- Genus: Banksia
- Subgenus: Banksia subg. Banksia
- Section: Banksia sect. Oncostylis
- Series: Banksia ser. Abietinae
- Species: B. scabrella

Binomial name
- Banksia scabrella A.S.George

= Banksia scabrella =

Burma Road banksia

Species of shrub from Western Australia

Banksia scabrella, commonly known as the Burma Road banksia, is a species of woody shrub in the genus Banksia. It is classified in the series Abietinae, a group of several species of shrubs with small round or oval inflorescences. It occurs in a number of isolated populations south of Geraldton, Western Australia, with the largest population being south and east of Mount Adams. Found on sandy soils in heathland or shrubland, it grows to 2 m (7 ft) high and 3 m (10 ft) across with fine needle-like leaves. Appearing in spring and summer, the inflorescences are round to oval in shape and tan to cream with purple styles. Banksia scabrella is killed by fire and regenerates by seed.

Originally collected in 1966, B. scabrella was one of several species previously considered to be forms of Banksia sphaerocarpa, before it was finally described by banksia expert Alex George in his 1981 revision of the genus. Like many members of the Abietinae, it is rarely seen in cultivation; however, it has been described as having horticultural potential.

== Description ==
Banksia scabrella grows as a low shrub to 2 m (6.6 ft) in height and 3 m (9.8 ft) across, with a spreading habit. Its lateral branches are low and often rest on the ground. The small linear leaves measure 0.8 to 2.8 cm in length and 0.1 cm in width and are crowded along the stems. George recorded flowering as occurring in spring and summer (September to January), but The Banksia Atlas recorded the species in bloom in April. Flowers occur in "flower spikes", or inflorescences, made up of hundreds of small flowers, or florets, densely packed around a woody axis. Quite conspicuous, they are terminal (occurring on the ends of branches) or on short side branchlets. Round or oval in shape, the cream or tan inflorescences are 3 to 6 cm (1.2 to 2.4 in) high and 7–9 cm (2.8–3.5 in) wide. The individual flowers are light yellow or cream, with the styles and upper floral parts purple. The perianths measure 2.7 to 3.5 cm (1.1 to 1.4 in), while the pistils 3.4 to 4.5 cm (1.3 to 1.8 in) in length and are curved at the apex. The inflorescences fade to grey as they age and the old flowers do not fall off. Up to 80 follicles develop on one spike, and remain closed until opened after a bushfire. Oval-shaped, they measure 1.8–2.8 cm (0.71–1.10 in) in length, by 0.5–0.9 cm (0.20–0.35 in) high, and 0.6–0.8 cm (0.24–0.31 in) wide. They open to release a dark brown oval seed 1.3–1.5 cm (0.51–0.59 in) long, 0.4–0.5 cm (0.16–0.20 in) wide with a papery dark 'wing' 1.4–2.4 cm (0.55–0.94 in) wide. Seedlings have narrowly obovate bright green cotyledons 1.2–1.4 cm (0.47–0.55 in) long by 0.3–0.4 cm (0.12–0.16 in) wide, and the leaves which develop immediately afterward are linear and scattered, and the stem is hairy.

== Taxonomy ==
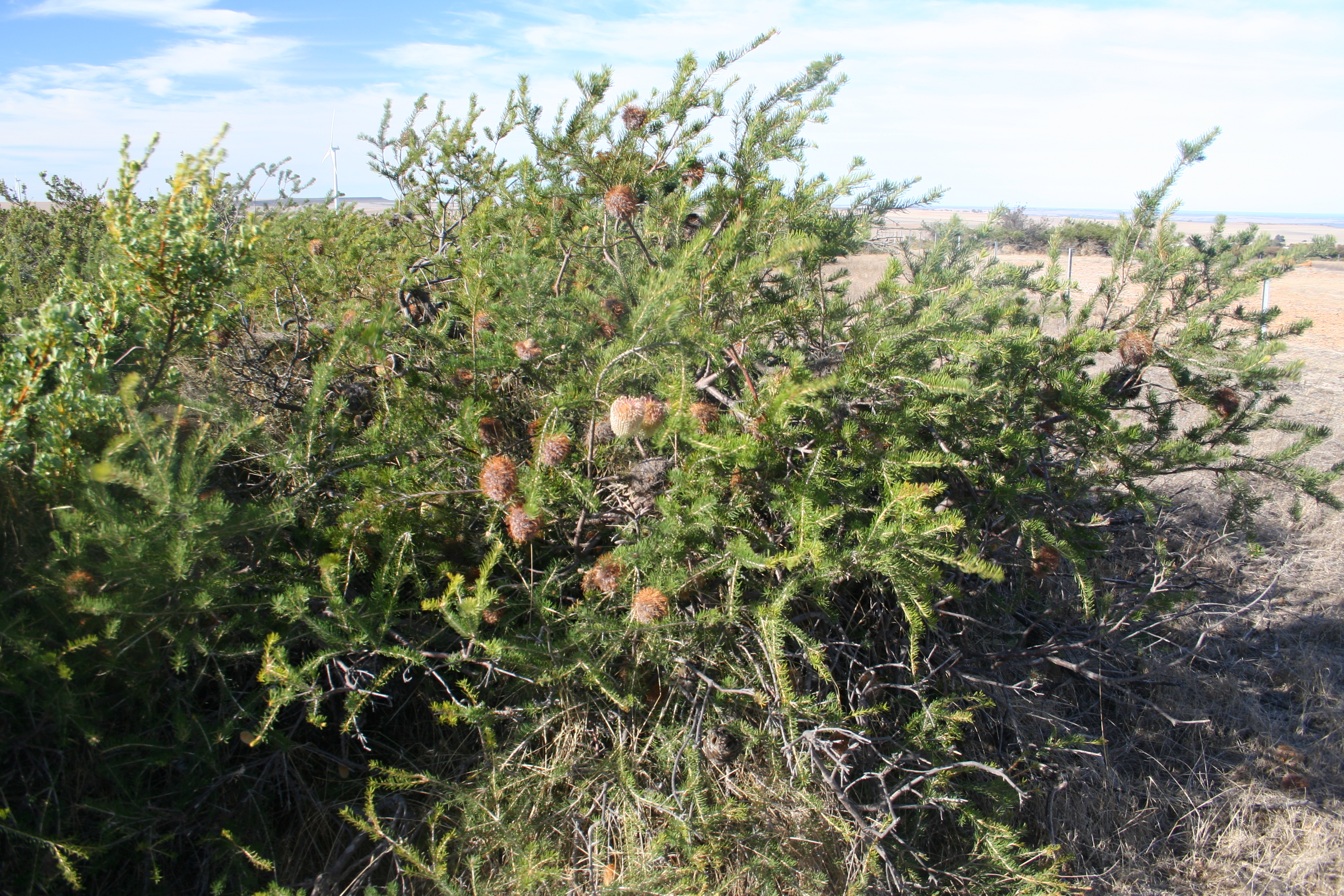
Habit, near Walkaway Wind Farm

First collected on 4 September 1966, southeast of Walkaway, Banksia scabrella was described by Alex George in his 1981 revision of the genus Banksia. He gave it the epithet scabrella, a diminutive of the Latin adjective scaber "rough", referring to the leaves. George placed B. scabrella in subgenus Banksia because of its flower spike, section Oncostylis because its styles are hooked, and the resurrected series Abietinae, which he constrained to contain only round-fruited species. He initially thought its closest relative to be Banksia leptophylla, which is found in the same region, and later felt it to be B. lanata, which has similarly coloured inflorescences but longer smooth leaves. It was one of several new species previously regarded as a form of Banksia sphaerocarpa.

In 1996, botanists Kevin Thiele and Pauline Ladiges published an arrangement informed by a cladistic analysis of morphological characteristics. They retained George's subgenera and many of his series, but discarded his sections. Banksia ser. Abietinae was found to be very nearly monophyletic, and so retained. It further resolved into four subclades, so Thiele and Ladiges split it into four subseries. Banksia scabrella appeared in the third of these, initially called the "telmatiaea clade" for its most basal member. As with George's classification, B. lanata and two subspecies of B. leptophylla emerged as close relatives of B. scabrella, but there was some question over the relationships between all five forms in the clade.

- B. telmatiaea
- - B. scabrella
  - - B. leptophylla var. melletica
    - - B. leptophylla var. leptophylla
      - B. lanata

This clade became the basis for a new subseries Leptophyllae, which Thiele defined as containing species with "indurated and spinescent common bracts on the infructescence axes", and seedling stems which were densely arachnose (covered in fine hair). Thiele and Ladiges' arrangement was not accepted by George, and was largely discarded by him in his 1999 arrangement. B. ser. Abietinae was restored to George's 1981 circumscription, and all of Thiele and Ladiges' subseries were abandoned. The placement of B. scabrella in George's 1999 arrangement may be summarised as follows:

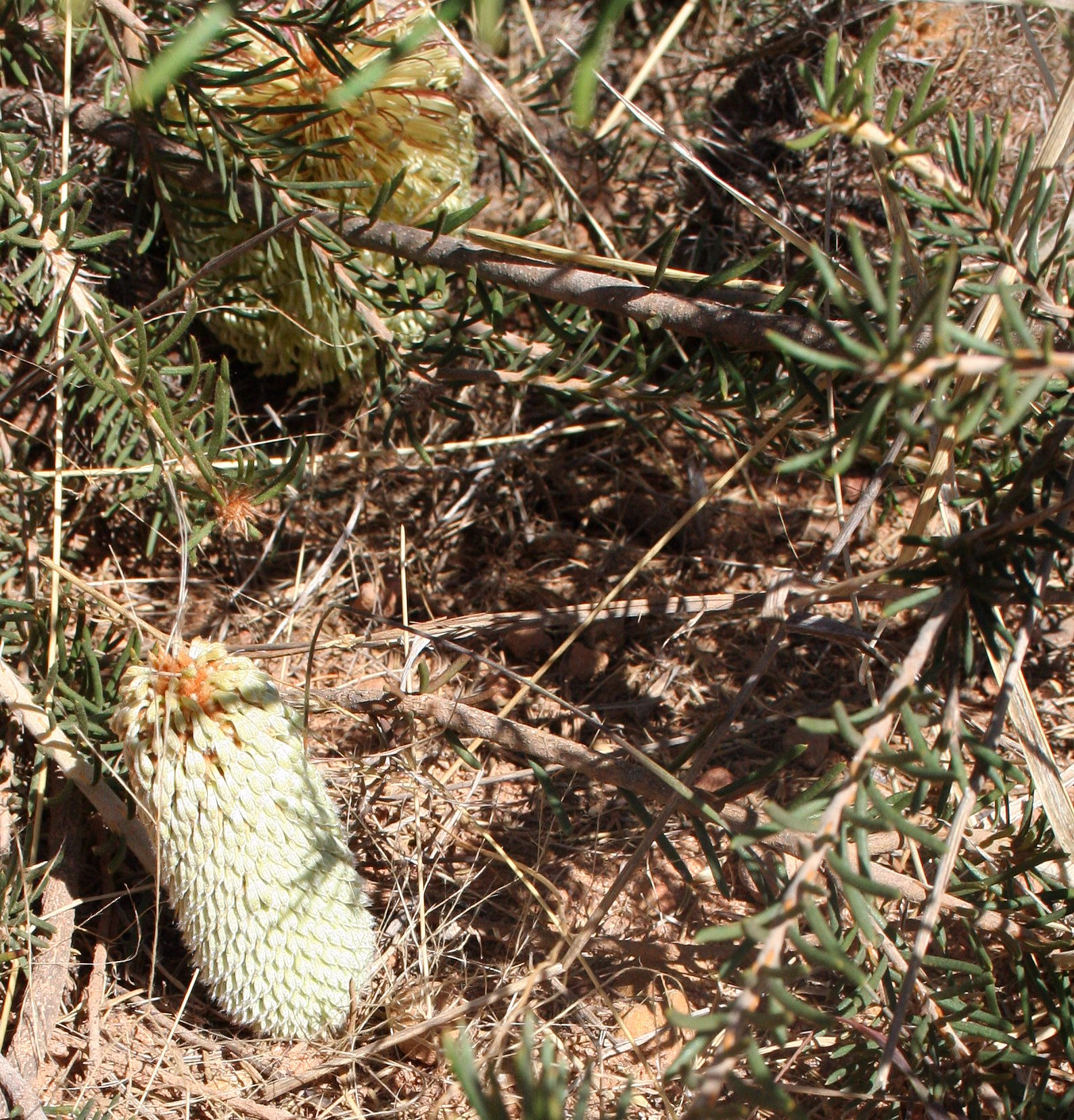
Bud developing on stems on ground, road verge, Burma Road

Banksia

B. subg. Banksia

B. sect. Banksia (9 series, 50 species, 9 subspecies, 3 varieties)
B. sect. Coccinea (1 species)
B. sect. Oncostylis

B. ser. Abietinae

B. sphaerocarpa (3 varieties)
B. micrantha
B. grossa
B. telmatiaea
B. leptophylla (2 varieties)
B. lanata
B. scabrella
B. violacea
B. incana
B. laricina
B. pulchella
B. meisneri (2 subspecies)
B. nutans (2 varieties)

A 2002 study by American botanists Austin Mast and Tom Givnish concurred with Alex George's observations in that molecular analysis mapped out scabrella as one of a clade containing B. lanata, both subspecies of B. leptophylla and B. telmatiaea, with B. grossa as a more distant relative. Early in 2007, Mast and Thiele initiated a rearrangement of Banksia by merging Dryandra into it, and publishing B. subg. Spathulatae for the taxa having spoon-shaped cotyledons. They foreshadowed publishing a full arrangement once DNA sampling of Dryandra was complete; in the meantime, if Mast and Thiele's nomenclatural changes are taken as an interim arrangement, then B. scabrella is placed in B. subg. Spathulatae.

== Distribution and habitat ==
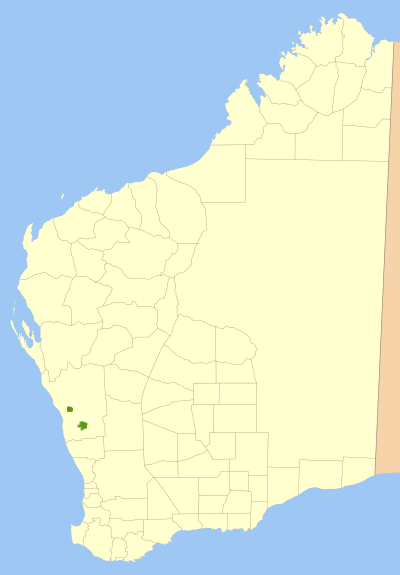
Distribution of Banksia scabrella. Lower region is that near Mount Adams.

Banksia scabrella is found in two disjunct areas of scattered populations; the first discovered being southeast of the small town of Walkaway south of Geraldton, while a more populous cluster is found southeast of Mount Adams in Western Australia. The average annual rainfall over its range is around 450 mm (18 in). It has been placed on the Declared Rare and Priority Flora List, where it is classified as a "Priority Four – Rare" taxon; although it is rare, it is not currently threatened by any identifiable factors. These taxa require monitoring every 5 to 10 years. Many stands are populous, and number over 100 plants. However, over half the known population of B. scabrella is found on road verges. Found in deep pale yellow or white sand in kwongan scrubland and heathland, B. scabrella grows on flat areas or gentle slopes and is found in association with B. leptophylla and a dwarf form of B. attenuata.

== Ecology ==
Most Proteaceae and all Banksia species, including B. scabrella, have proteoid roots, roots with dense clusters of short lateral rootlets that form a mat in the soil just below the leaf litter. These roots are particularly efficient at absorbing nutrients from nutrient-poor soils, such as the phosphorus-deficient native soils of Australia. B. scabrella is highly susceptible to Phytophthora cinnamomi dieback.

Killed by fire, the species regenerates from seed afterwards. The resultant seedlings have been recorded flowering two or three years after bushfires, although records are few. No pollinators were recorded during observations for the Banksia Atlas, although banksia flowerheads in general play host to a variety of birds, mammals and insects.

The region between Geraldton and Gingin is a rich one for Abietinae banksias, and nine species occur there. Despite this, there is little overlap in range and habitat; Banksia scabrella is unusual in its co-occurrence with B. leptophylla. It is also associated with the endangered heath shrub Leucopogon marginatus. Burma Road Nature Reserve is one of the few protected conservation areas in its range; there, Banksia scabrella is found most commonly in (and forms a prominent part of) a mallee sedgeland, which is dominated by the cord rush Ecdeiocolea monostachya as a ground cover, and the mallee Eucalyptus eudesmoides as an emergent species. It is found occasionally in acacia scrub-heath, and rarely in acacia thickets and banksia woodland. An assessment of the potential impact of climate change on this species found that its range is unlikely to contract and may actually grow, depending on how effectively it migrates into newly habitable areas.

== Cultivation ==
Seeds do not require any treatment, and take 14 to 16 days to germinate. Rarely cultivated, Banksia scabrella flowers in 3 to 5 years from seed. Information is limited on its reliability, but it has been grown successfully in South Australia. It is fast-growing but ultimately untidy in habit, and would benefit from regular pruning. Some forms in the wild have a more compact habit, and are more promising for horticulture.
