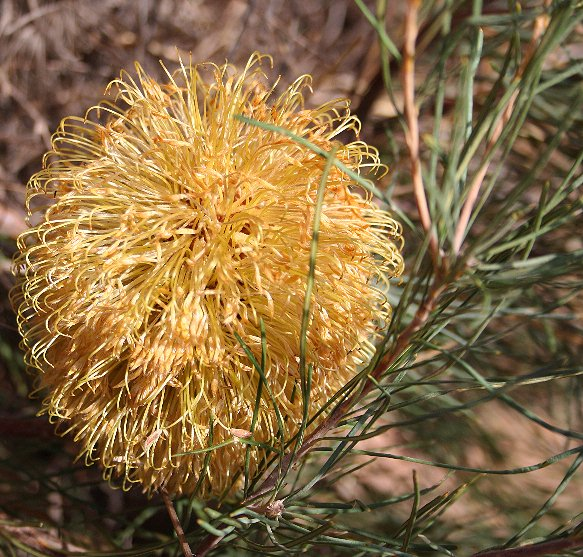
- Banksia leptophylla (slender-leaved banksia), the type species of B. subser. Leptophyllae

Scientific classification
- Kingdom: Plantae
- Clade: Tracheophytes
- Clade: Angiosperms
- Clade: Eudicots
- Order: Proteales
- Family: Proteaceae
- Genus: Banksia
- Series: Banksia ser. Abietinae
- Subseries: Banksia subser. Leptophyllae; K.R.Thiele

= Banksia subser. Leptophyllae =

Subseries of plant found in Australia

Banksia subser. Leptophyllae is a valid botanic name for a subseries of Banksia. It was published by Kevin Thiele in 1996, but discarded by Alex George in 1999.

== Cladistics ==
The name came about after a cladistic analysis of Banksia by Thiele and Pauline Ladiges yielded a phylogeny somewhat at odds with the accepted taxonomic arrangement, prompting them to publish a revised arrangement. Their cladogram contained a clade that corresponded closely to George's B. ser. Abietinae. This clade resolved into four subclades, for which Thiele published four corresponding subseries. B. subser. Leptophyllae was based upon the fourth subclade:

- B. telmatiaea
- - B. scabrella
  - - B. leptophylla var. melletica
    - - B. leptophylla var. leptophylla
      - B. lanata

== Taxonomy ==
B. subser. Leptophyllae was formally defined as containing those taxa with "indurated and spinescent common bracts on the infructescence axes, and densely arachnose seedling stems." The epithet Leptophyllae is taken from the specific epithet of the type species, B. leptophylla (slender-leaved banksia), from the Greek leptos ("fine, slender") and phyllon (leaf). It was selected as appropriate for the subseries, the species of which have long leaves that are narrower than most other species in B. ser. Abietinae.

The placement and circumscription of B. subser. Leptophyllae in Thiele and Ladiges' arrangement may be summarised as follows:

Banksia

B. subg. Isostylis (3 species)
B. elegans (incertae sedis)
B. subg. Banksia

B. ser. Tetragonae (4 species)
B. ser. Lindleyanae (1 species)
B. ser. Banksia (2 subseries, 12 species)
B. baueri (incertae sedis)
B. lullfitzii (incertae sedis)
B. attenuata (incertae sedis)
B. ashbyi (incertae sedis)
B. coccinea (incertae sedis)
B. ser. Prostratae (8 species)
B. ser. Cyrtostylis (4 species)
B. ser. Ochraceae (3 species, 2 subspecies)
B. ser. Grandes (2 species)
B. ser. Salicinae (2 subseries, 11 species, 4 subspecies)
B. ser. Spicigerae (3 subseries, 7 species, 6 varieties)
B. ser. Quercinae (2 species)
B. ser. Dryandroideae (1 species)
B. ser. Abietinae

B. subser. Nutantes (1 species, 2 varieties)
B. subser. Sphaerocarpae (4 species, 2 varieties)
B. subser. Leptophyllae

B. telmatiaea
B. scabrella
B. leptophylla

B. leptophylla var. melletica
B. leptophylla var. leptophylla

B. lanata

B. subser. Longistyles (6 species, 2 varieties)

Thiele and Ladiges' arrangement remained current only until 1999, when George's treatment of the genus for the Flora of Australia series of monographs was published. This was essentially a revision of George's 1981 arrangement, which took into account some of Thiele and Ladiges' data, but rejected their overall arrangement. B. subser. Leptophyllae was discarded, as were the other three subseries of B. ser. Abietinae.

== Recent developments ==
Since 1998, Austin Mast has been publishing results of ongoing cladistic analyses of DNA sequence data for the subtribe Banksiinae. His analyses suggest a phylogeny that is rather different from previous taxonomic arrangements. With respect to B. subser. Leptophyllae, Mast's results accord closely with the arrangement of Thiele and Ladiges, inferring a polytomous clade corresponding exactly with Thiele and Ladiges' subseries, with B. grossa (coarse banksia) as the nearest outgroup:

Early in 2007 Mast and Thiele initiated a rearrangement of Banksia by transferring Dryandra into it, and publishing B. subg. Spathulatae for the species having spoon-shaped cotyledons. All members of subseries Leptophyllae fall within Mast and Thiele's B. subg. Spathulatae, but nothing further has been published. Mast and Thiele have foreshadowed publishing a full arrangement once DNA sampling of Dryandra is complete.
