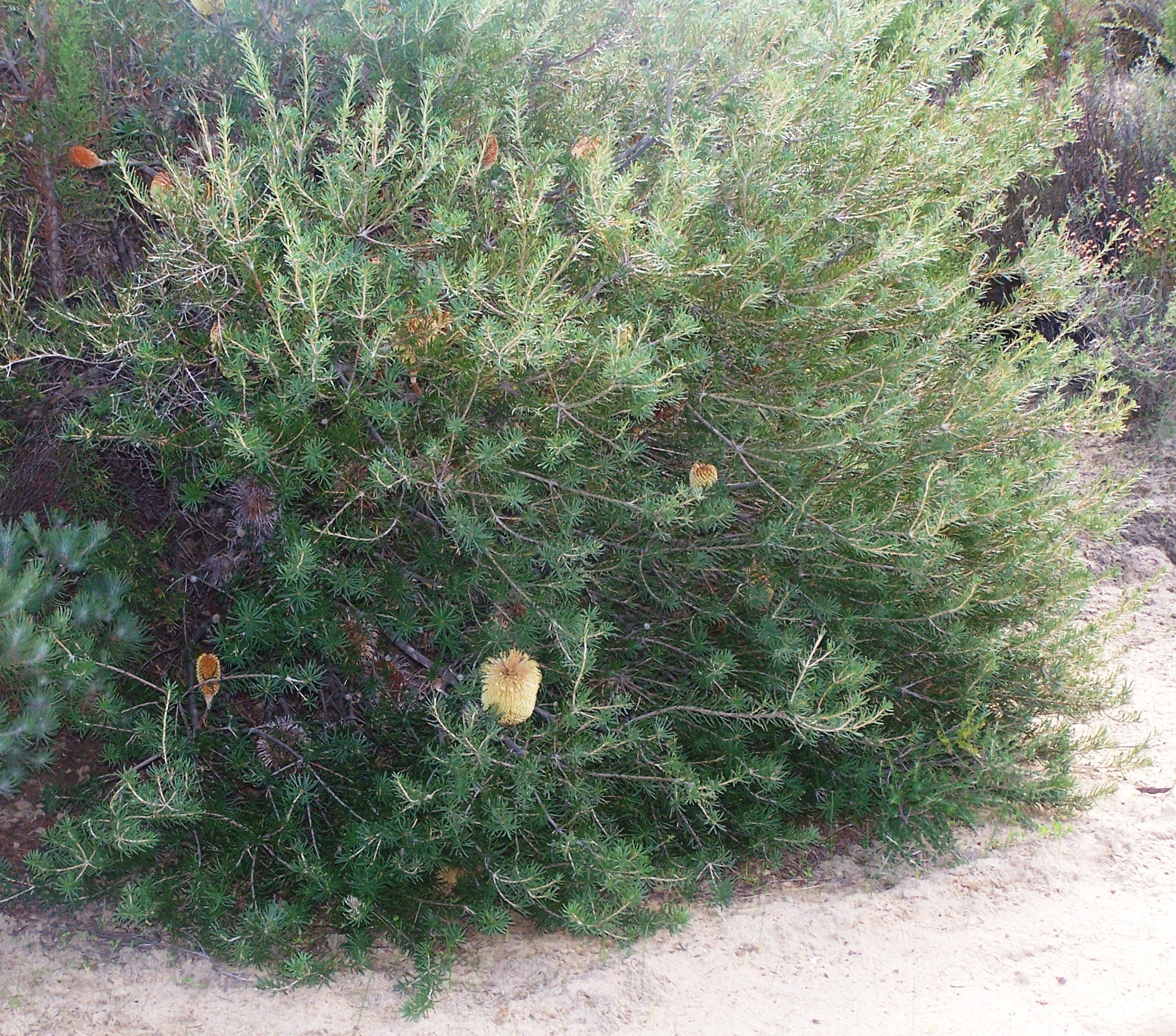

Scientific classification
- Kingdom: Plantae
- Clade: Tracheophytes
- Clade: Angiosperms
- Clade: Eudicots
- Order: Proteales
- Family: Proteaceae
- Genus: Banksia
- Species: B. telmatiaea

Binomial name
- Banksia telmatiaea A.S.George
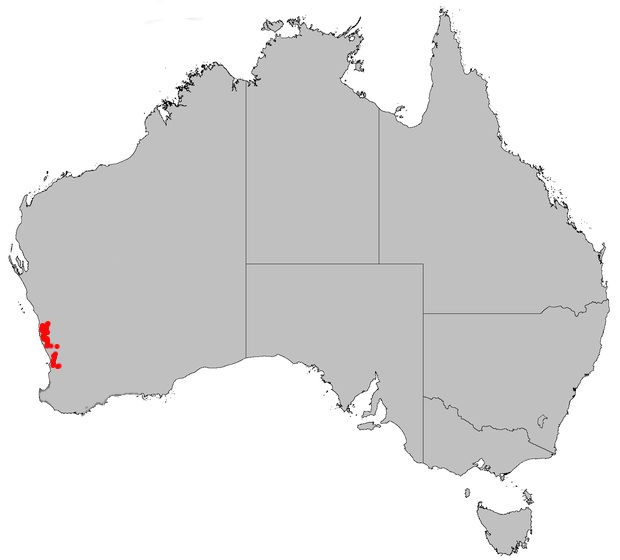
- Distribution of Banksia telmatiaea

= Banksia telmatiaea =

Swamp fox banksia

Species of shrub found in western Australia

Banksia telmatiaea, commonly known as swamp fox banksia or rarely marsh banksia, is a shrub that grows in marshes and swamps along the lower west coast of Australia. It grows as an upright bush up to 2 metres (6 feet 7 inches) tall, with narrow leaves and a pale brown flower spike, which can produce profuse quantities of nectar. First collected in the 1840s, it was not published as a separate species until 1981; as with several other similar species it was previously included in B. sphaerocarpa (fox banksia).

The shrub grows amongst scrubland in seasonally wet lowland areas of the coastal sandplain between Badgingarra and Serpentine in Western Australia. A little studied species, not much is known of its ecology or conservation biology. Reports suggest that a variety of birds and small mammals pollinate it. Like many members of the series Abietinae, it has not been considered to have much horticultural potential and is rarely cultivated.

== Description ==
B. telmatiaea grows as an upright bush up to 2 m (6.6 ft) high. It has hairy stems and branchlets, and straight, narrow leaves from 1 1/2 to 3 cm (1/2 to 1 1/4 in) long and about a one millimetre (1/16 in) wide. The leaves have a green upper surface and white hairy undersurface. The new growth is pale brown, later turning green.

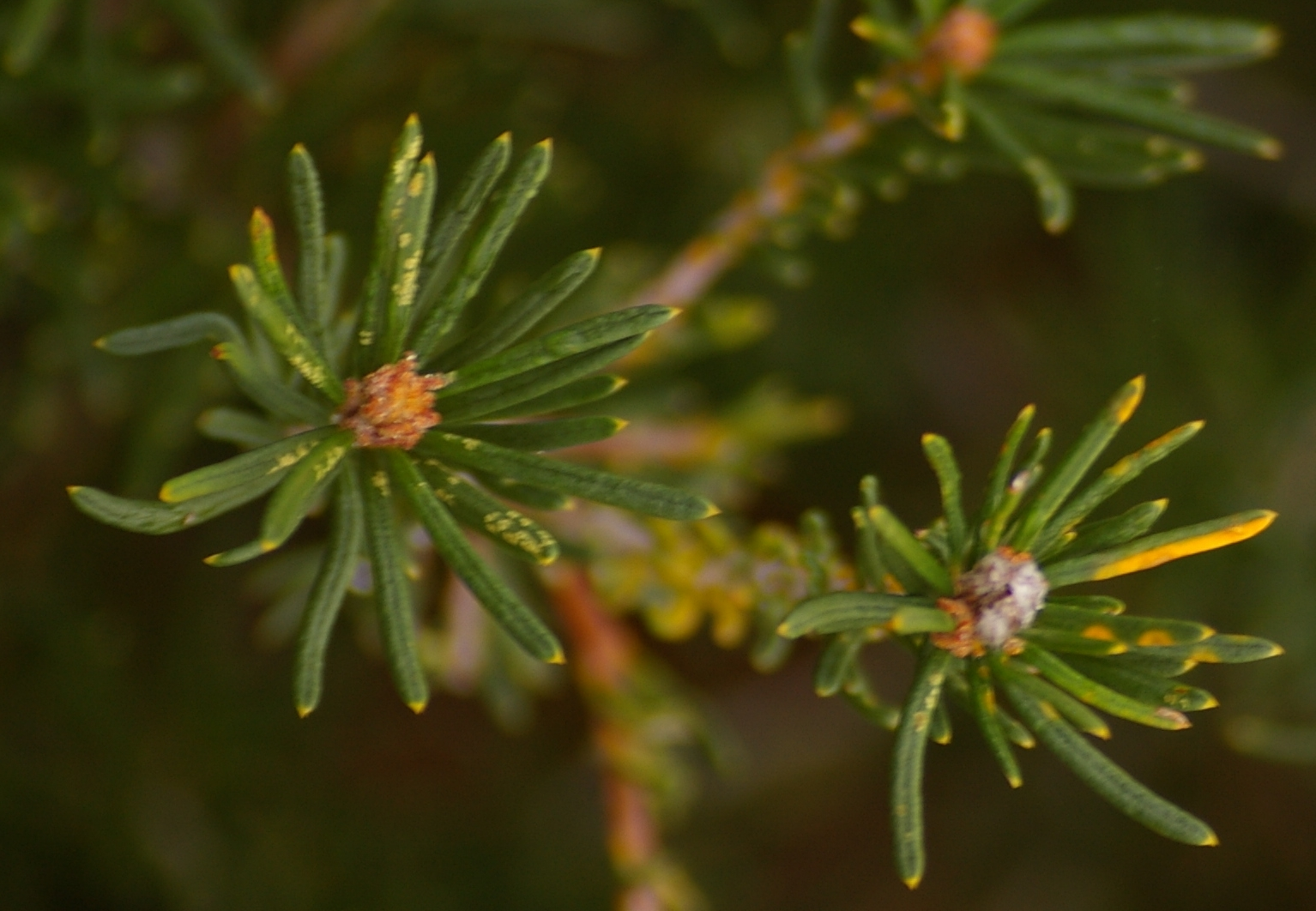
Closeup of foliage

Flowers occur in "flower spikes", inflorescences made up of hundreds of flower pairs densely packed around a woody axis. Arising from short lateral branchlets off stems older than four years of age, the inflorescence of B. telmatiaea is roughly oval to cylindrical, with a height of 3–5 cm (1–2 in) and diameter of 4–7 centimetres (1 1/2–2 3/4 in). It contains between 500 and 900 golden brown to pale brown flowers, each of which consists of a tubular perianth made up of four fused tepals, and one long wiry style. The styles are hooked rather than straight, and are initially trapped inside the upper perianth parts, but break free at anthesis. The species generally flowers from April to August, although flowers have been observed as late as November. They take five to six weeks to develop from bud, then reach anthesis over a period of two weeks. The flowers produce unusually large quantities of nectar; indeed some flowers produce so much that it drips to the ground.

The fruiting structure is a stout woody "cone", with a hairy appearance caused by the persistence of old withered flower parts. Up to 70 woody follicles, each of which contains a single seed, may be embedded in the cone. As with other Banksia species, only a small proportion of flowers go on to form follicles; in the case of B. telmatiaea, the proportion is around 4% for those "cones" that set some fruit. About 80% of fruiting structures set no fruit at all. According to John K. Scott, "there [is] no obvious reason on the basis of morphology of pollination for this lack of seed set".

== Taxonomy ==
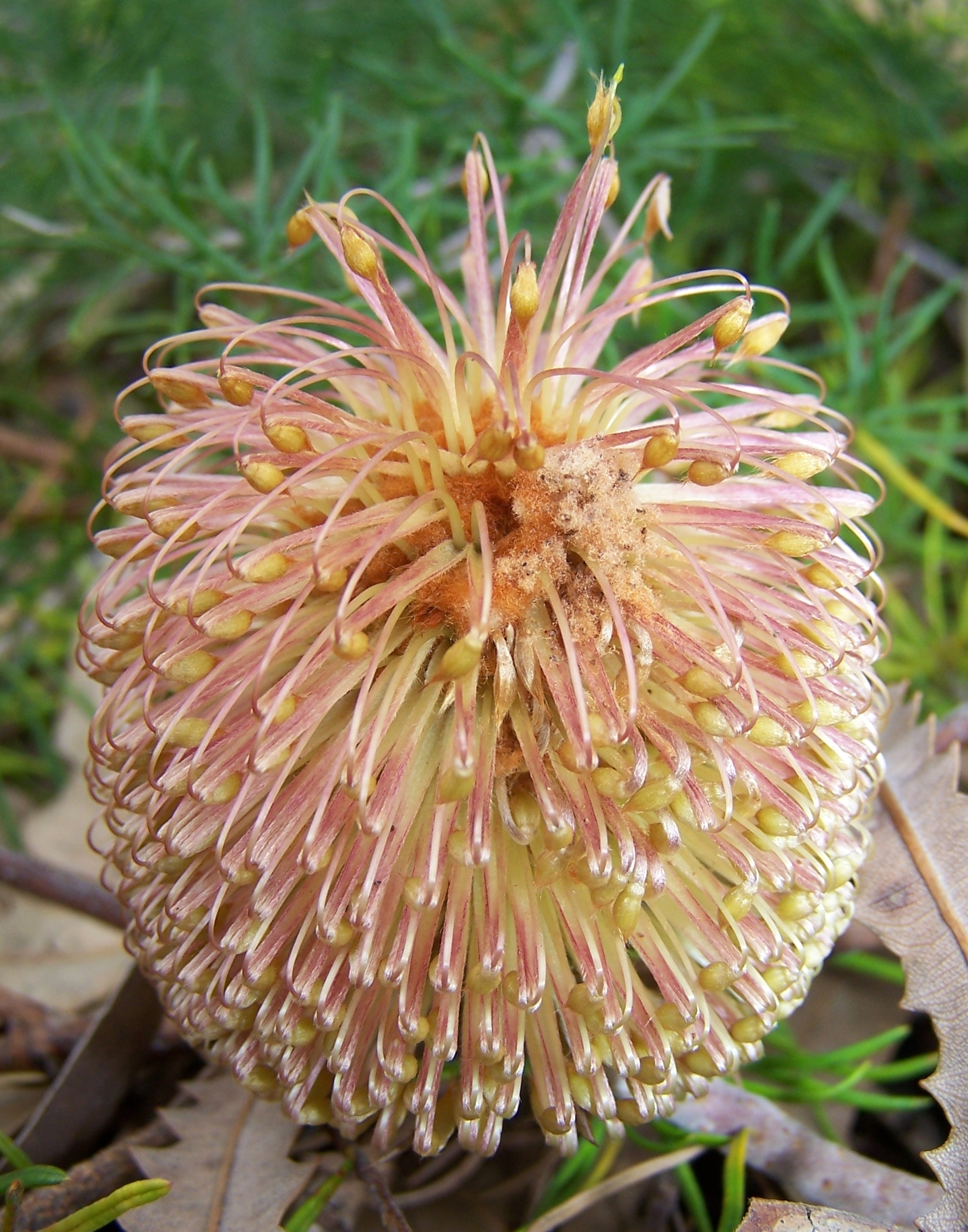
Inflorescence in late bud

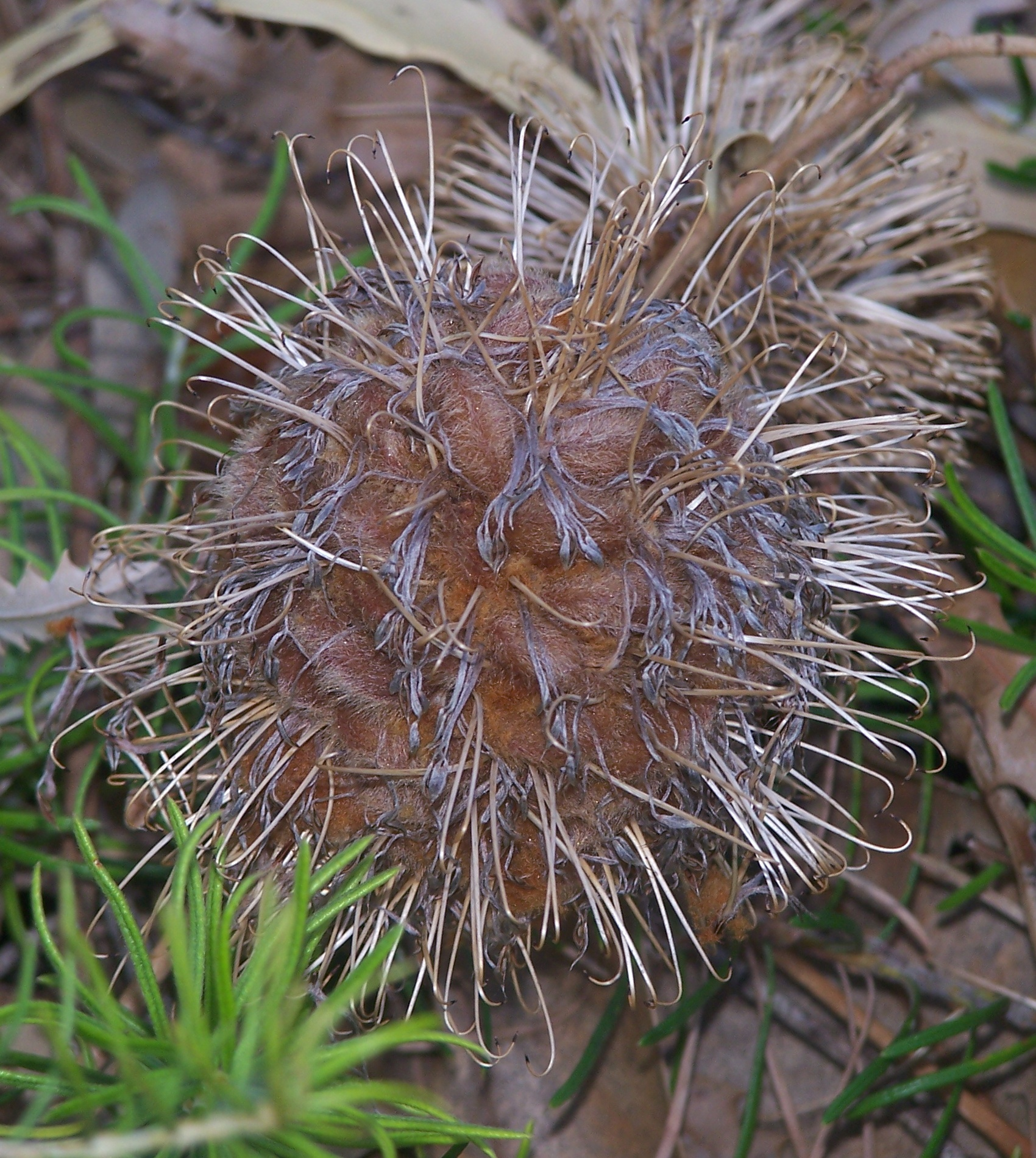
Fruiting structure with persistent flowers and closed follicles

=== Discovery and naming ===
B. telmatiaea was first collected around 1840 by Ludwig Preiss and James Drummond. For many years it was included in B. sphaerocarpa, but by 1980 it was recognised as a distinct species. In recognition of its distinctness from, yet affinity with, B. sphaerocarpa, it was for a time informally referred to as Banksia aff. Sphaerocarpa. It was eventually published by Alex George in his 1981 monograph The genus Banksia L.f. (Proteaceae), based on a specimen collected by him on the Brand Highway about 45 kilometres (28 miles) north of Regans Ford on 14 May 1969, and labelled "A. S. George 9309". He found it most closely resembled B. leptophylla, but regarded its preference for swampy rather than sandy soils and winter flowering as worthy of warranting species status. George gave it the specific name telmatiaea from the Greek stem telmat-/τελματ- ("the mud of a pond"), in reference to its swampy habitat. Thus the full name for the species is Banksia telmatiaea A.S.George. Common names for B. telmatiaea include swamp fox banksia and marsh banksia.

=== Infrageneric placement ===
George placed B. telmatiaea in subgenus Banksia because its inflorescence is a typical Banksia flower spike, section Oncostylis because it has hooked styles, and series Abietinae because its inflorescence is roughly spherical. He considered its closest relative to be B. leptophylla (Slender-leaved Banksia), which differs from B. telmatiaea in having longer leaves and larger flowers; yet in his arrangement he placed it between B. scabrella (Burma Road Banksia) and B. laricina (Rose-fruited Banksia).

In 1996, Kevin Thiele and Pauline Ladiges published the results of a cladistic analysis of morphological characters of Banksia. They retained George's subgenera and many of his series, but discarded his sections. B. ser. Abietinae was found to be very nearly monophyletic, and so retained. It further resolved into four subclades, so Thiele and Ladiges split it into four subseries. B. telmatiaea appeared in the third of these:

- B. telmatiaea
- - B. scabrella
  - - B. leptophylla var. melletica
    - - B. leptophylla var. leptophylla
      - B. lanata

This clade became the basis of B. subser. Leptophyllae, which Thiele defined as containing those species with "indurated and spinescent common bracts on the infructescence axes, and densely arachnose seedling stems." In accordance with their cladogram, their arrangement placed B. telmatiaea next to B. scabrella.

Thiele and Ladiges' arrangement was not accepted by George, and was largely discarded by him in his 1999 arrangement. B. ser. Abietinae was restored to George's 1981 circumscription, and all of Thiele and Ladiges' subseries were abandoned. B. telmatiaea was moved in the phyletic order to between B. grossa (Coarse Banksia) and B. leptophylla, thus better according with the affinity with B. leptophylla claimed by George in 1981.

The placement of B. telmatiaea in George's 1999 arrangement may be summarised as follows:

Banksia

B. subg. Banksia

B. sect. Banksia (9 series, 50 species, 9 subspecies, 3 varieties)
B. sect. Coccinea (1 species)
B. sect. Oncostylis

B. ser. Spicigerae (7 species, 2 subspecies, 4 varieties)
B. ser. Tricuspidae (1 species)
B. ser. Dryandroideae (1 species)
B. ser. Abietinae

B. sphaerocarpa (3 varieties)
B. micrantha
B. grossa
B. telmatiaea
B. leptophylla (2 varieties)
B. lanata
B. scabrella
B. violacea
B. incana
B. laricina
B. pulchella
B. meisneri (2 subspecies)
B. nutans (2 varieties)

B. subg. Isostylis (3 species)

Since 1998, Austin Mast has been publishing results of ongoing cladistic analyses of DNA sequence data for the subtribe Banksiinae. His analyses suggest a phylogeny that is very different from George's arrangement. With respect to B. telmatiaea, Mast's results accord closely with Thiele and Ladiges' arrangement, inferring a polytomous clade consisting of B. leptophylla, B. telmatiaea, B. scabrella and B. lanata, with B. grossa (Coarse Banksia) as the nearest outgroup:

- - B. telmatiaea
  - B. scabrella
  - B. leptophylla var. melletica
  - B. leptophylla var. leptophylla
  - B. lanata
- B. grossa

Early in 2007, Mast and Thiele initiated a rearrangement of Banksia by merging Dryandra into it, and publishing B. subg. Spathulatae for the taxa having spoon-shaped cotyledons. They foreshadowed publishing a full arrangement once DNA sampling of Dryandra was complete; in the meantime, if Mast and Thiele's nomenclatural changes are taken as an interim arrangement, then B. telmatiaea is placed in B. subg. Spathulatae.

== Distribution and habitat ==
B. telmatiaea grows only in the Swan Coastal Plain, Geraldton Sandplains and Jarrah Forest biogeographic regions, inland from the coast but never east of the Darling Scarp. It occurs from Hill River near Badgingarra in the north, to Serpentine in the south. Most populations occur north of Moore River or south of Cannington, there being only a few scattered populations in between.

The species favours lowland areas that are seasonally wet but never inundated, such as the margins of swamps and marshes. For example, in the Yule Brook Botany Reserve, where parallel sand ridges cross a clay flat, B. telmatiaea occurs neither in the lowest parts of the flat, where seasonal inundation occurs; nor on the tops of the ridges, where the drainage is good; but it is one of the most abundant plants of intermediate habitats, on ridge slopes and in higher areas of the clay flat.

Favoured soils are deep grey sandy loams or shallower sand overlying claypan. Associated vegetation is typically scrubland or shrubland, although moisture-loving trees such as B. littoralis (swamp banksia) or Melaleuca preissiana (moonah) may also be present, sometimes in sufficient numbers to form a low open woodland.

== Ecology ==
Like most other Proteaceae, B. telmatiaea has proteoid roots, roots with dense clusters of short lateral rootlets that form a mat in the soil just below the leaf litter. These roots are particularly efficient at absorbing nutrients from nutrient-poor soils, such as the phosphorus-deficient native soils of Australia.

Unlike many Banksia species, B. telmatiaea lacks a lignotuber, so plants are killed by bushfire. It is adapted to release its aerial seed bank following a bushfire, and so regenerates rapidly. This behaviour, known as serotiny, makes B. telmatiaea dependent upon a suitable fire regime for successful regeneration; indeed, excessive fire frequency may be one reason why B. telmatiaea does not occur further south, despite suitable habitat throughout southwest Australia. Unlike most serotinous Banksia species, the seeds of B. telmatiaea are not released immediately after the passage of a bushfire. The follicles open straight away, but at first the seeds are blocked from falling out by the winged seed separator. If moistened, these wings close up, and as they dry they open out again, levering the seeds out of position, making it possible for them to fall. This adaptation ensures that seeds are released only after the first rains following a bushfire.

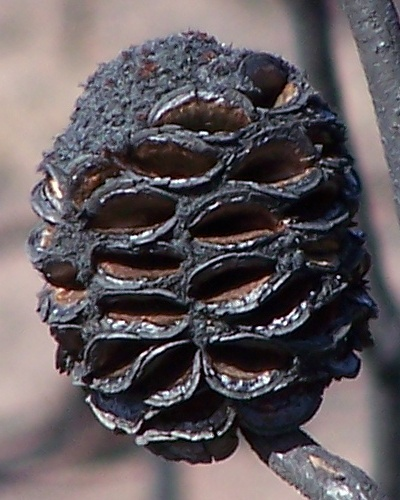
Bushfire kills adult plants, but also triggers the release of seed, ensuring rapid regeneration.

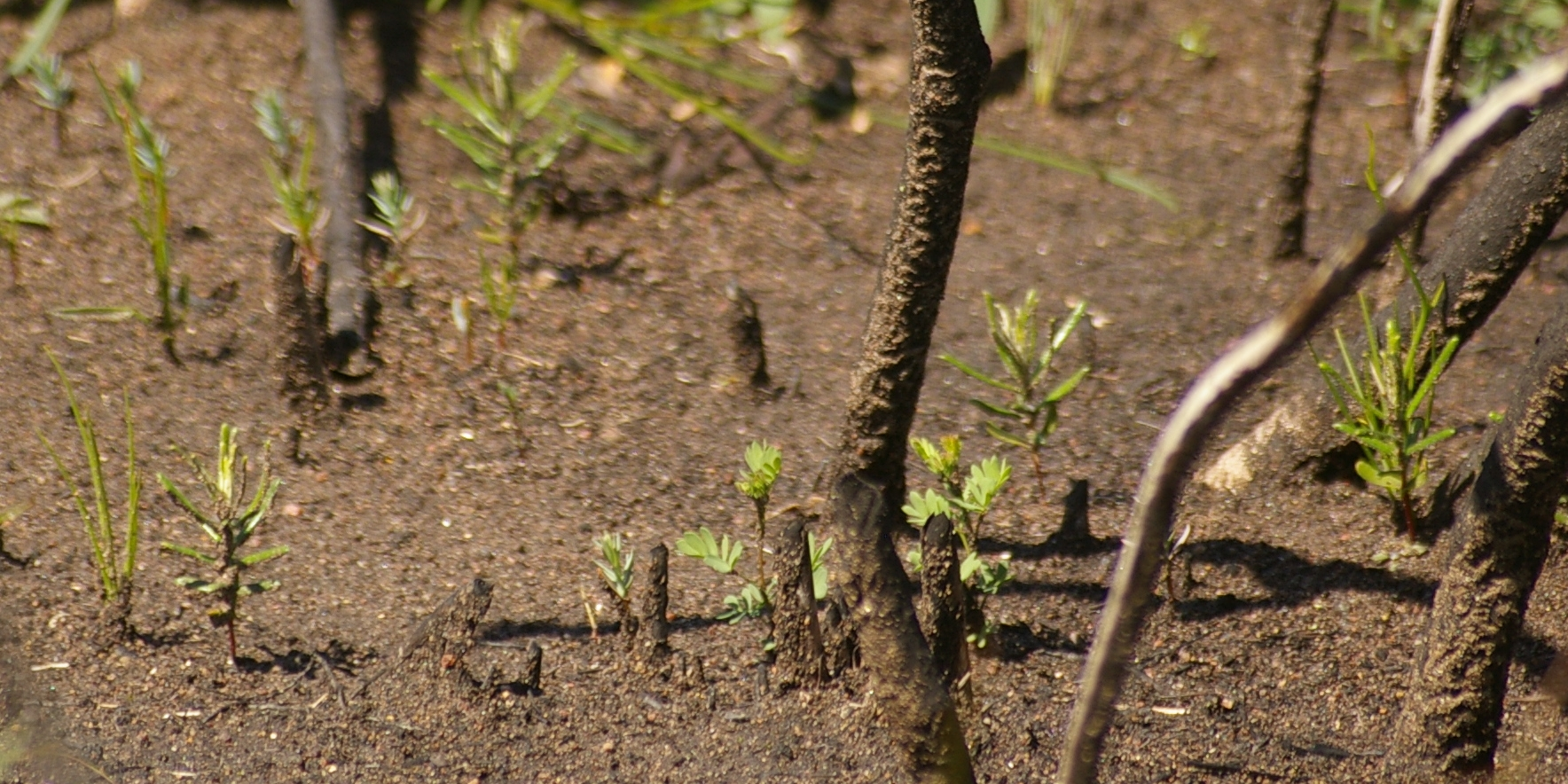
Recruitment of seedlings at the same location four months later

Four species of bird have been observed visiting the flowers of B. telmatiaea: the red wattlebird (Anthochaera carunculata), silvereye (Zosterops lateralis), New Holland honeyeater (Phylidonyris novaehollandiae) and the brown honeyeater (Lichmera indistincta). The introduced European honeybee (Apis mellifera) is also commonly observed, and visits by ants and Hylaeus plasterer bees have been recorded. Visits by nectarivorous mammals have not been directly observed, but their involvement in pollination is certain, as their scats have often been found on inflorescences, and studies of other Banksia species have consistently demonstrated their involvement. Moreover, a number of characteristics of the B. telmatiaea spike are purported to be adaptations to pollination by nocturnal mammals: the strong, musky odour, the occurrence of inflorescences hidden within the foliage close to the ground, the large amounts of nectar produced, and the pattern of nectar production, which peaks at dawn and dusk. This last adaptation is thought to favour visits by birds and mammals, which feed in the morning and evening respectively, as opposed to insects, which are most active during the day.

Reproductive success is strongly affected by insects that infest the flower spikes and fruiting structures. Infestation of the flower spikes is not as severe as in other Banksia species: one study found less than 10% of B. telmatiaea inflorescences to be infested, compared to over 50% for B. attenuata (candlestick banksia), B. littoralis and B. menziesii (Menzies' banksia), and over 90% for B. grandis (bull banksia). Also, whereas other species were attacked by a range of insects, the inflorescence of B. telmatiaea was attacked only by the tortrix moth Arotrophora arcuatalis (banksia boring moth), which burrows into the woody axis, rendering the spike barren. On the other hand, the same study observed heavy infestation of fruiting structures, with over 90% of spikes with follicles found to contain at least one larva of an unidentified species of moth of the genus Xylorycta. These larvae burrow from follicle to follicle to eat the seed, resulting in 100% seed loss for infested spikes.

B. telmatiaea is one of five Banksia species, all closely related to B. sphaerocarpa, that have highly unusual flower nectar. (Note: The other four species are Banksia grossa, B. incana, B. leptophylla and B. sphaerocarpa.) Whereas other Banksia species produce nectar that is clear and watery, the nectar of these species is pale yellow initially, but gradually becomes darker and thicker, changing to a thick, olive-green mucilage within one to two days of secretion. In the case of B. telmatiaea, it eventually becomes "an almost black, gelatinous lump adhering to the base of the flowers". This unusual nectar was first noted in 1980 by Byron Lamont, who attributed its transformation to the cyanobacteria that he observed feeding off the nectar sugars. Noting that many of these cyanobacteria had heterocysts, he speculated that they aid the plant by fixing atmospheric nitrogen, which is then washed off the flower heads by rain, and absorbed by the proteoid root mat. This purported symbiosis was investigated in 1985, but no evidence of nitrogen fixing was found. Further investigations in 1996 suggested that the discolouration is not caused by cyanobacteria or other microorganisms in the nectar, but is rather "a chemical phenomenon of plant origin". As of February 2007, the cause was still unknown. Chemical analysis of B. telmatiaea nectar has shown it to have a normal nectar sugar composition, albeit dominated by sucrose.

== Conservation ==
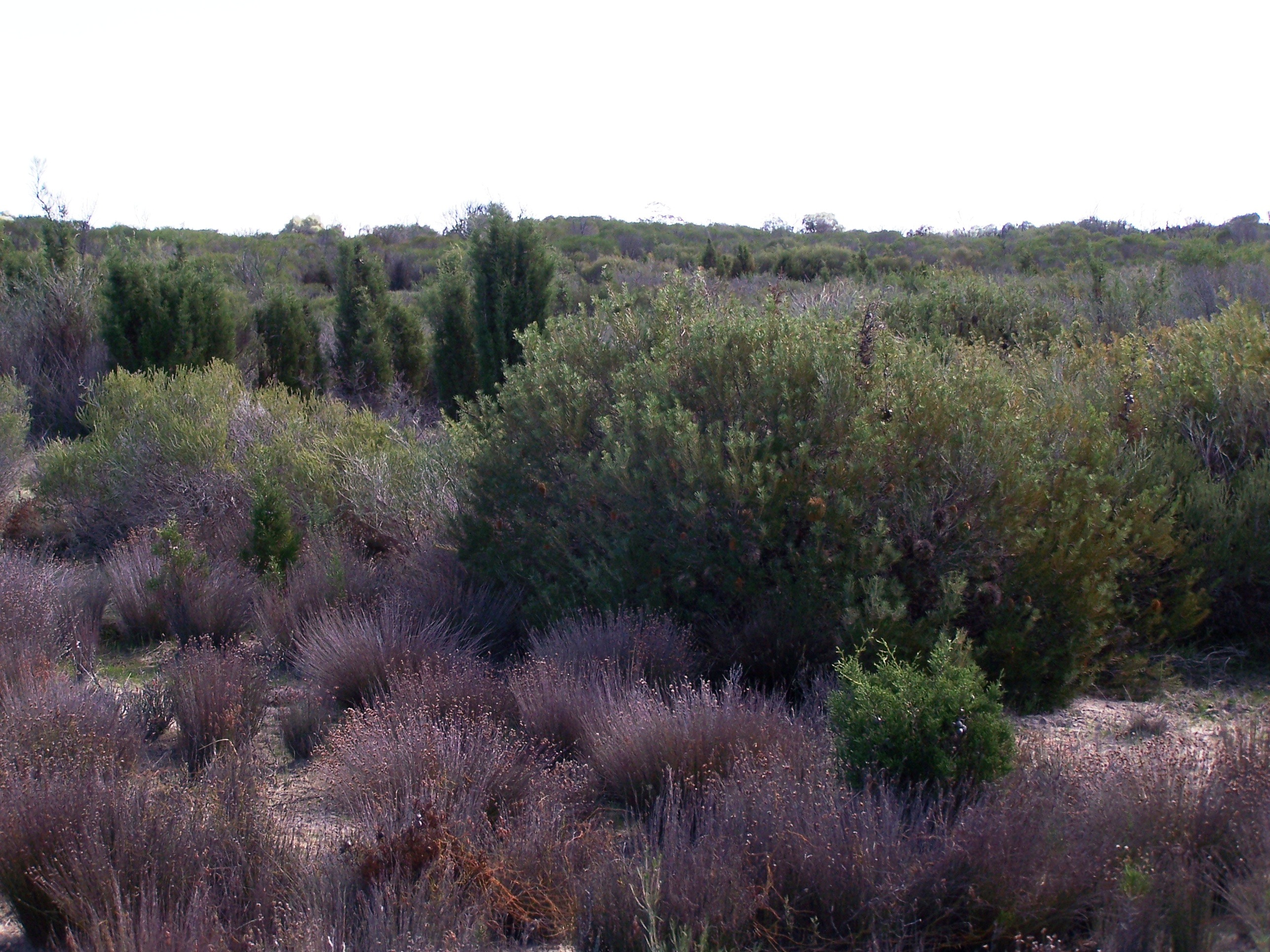
B. telmatiaea among scrub in the Yule Brook Botany Reserve

B. telmatiaea is a fairly secure species, as most populations are of more than 100 plants, and 26% of known plants are in conservation reserves. Its proximity to Perth suggests that land clearing for urban development could pose a threat, and in 1988 The Banksia Atlas recommended that "the species should continue to be monitored since land clearing could change the situation greatly, particularly amongst its northern populations." It is also known to be susceptible to dieback caused by the introduced plant pathogen Phytophthora cinnamomi, a soil-borne water mould that causes root rot; in fact it is so reliably susceptible that it is used as an indicator species for the presence of the disease. An assessment of the potential impact of climate change on this species found that severe change is likely to lead to extinction; but under less severe change scenarios the distribution may actually grow, depending on how effectively it can migrate into newly habitable areas.

In 1987, George applied the Rare or Threatened Australian Plants (ROTAP) criteria to the species, determining it to have a conservation status of "3R": a rare species found only in small populations, but not considered endangered or vulnerable. Western Australia's Department of Parks and Wildlife do not consider it to be rare, and have not included it on their Declared Rare and Priority Flora List.

== Cultivation ==
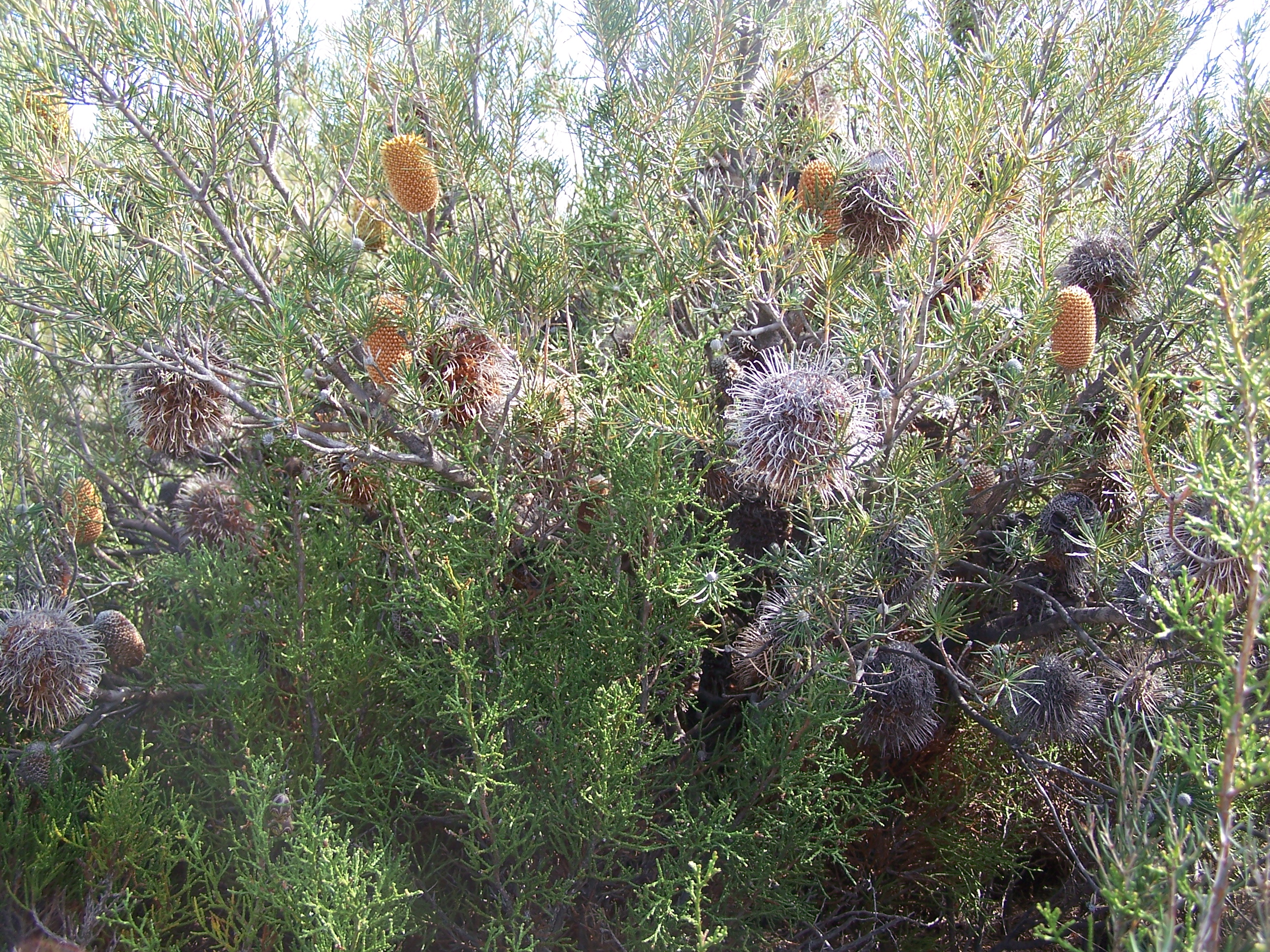
B. telmatiaea flowers prolifically, but hides its flower spikes within the bush, and tends to become untidy with age.

B. telmatiaea is rarely cultivated. It grows fairly quickly, but tends to become untidy as it ages. The flower spikes, though attractive, occur within the bush where they are usually obscured by foliage. In its natural habitat it flowers prolifically over several months, but according to George it may be reluctant to flower in cultivation. It tolerates light pruning not below the green foliage. George recommends a sunny position in poorly drained soil, preferably with moisture in winter. Seeds do not require any treatment, and take around 14 days to germinate.
