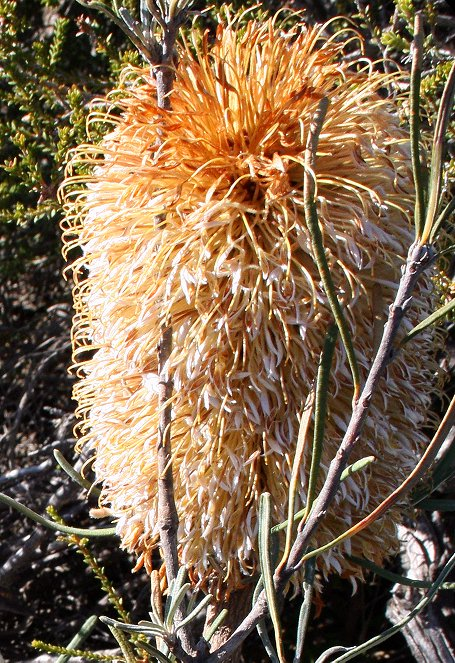
- B. grossa north of Badgingarra

Scientific classification
- Kingdom: Plantae
- Clade: Tracheophytes
- Clade: Angiosperms
- Clade: Eudicots
- Order: Proteales
- Family: Proteaceae
- Genus: Banksia
- Species: B. grossa

Binomial name
- Banksia grossa A.S.George

= Banksia grossa =

Species of shrub endemic to Australia

Banksia grossa is a species of shrub in the family Proteaceae and is endemic to Southwest Australia. It is one of fourteen species of banksia of the series Abietinae, all of which bear predominantly cylindrical or oval inflorescences. Collected in 1965, it was first formally described in 1981 by Alex George. Its thick leaves and large seeds distinguish it from other members of the Abietinae, and are the basis of its species name.

Found in sand or sand over laterite among heath between Eneabba and Badgingarra in Western Australia, the species grows as a many-stemmed shrub to 1 m (3.3 ft) high with narrow leaves and oval brownish flower spikes up to 10 cm (4 in) high, composed of hundreds of individual flowers. Flowering occurs throughout the cooler months of March to September. Flower spikes develop woody follicles which bear the seeds. After bushfire, Banksia grossa regenerates from its woody lignotuber; bushfires also stimulate the release of seeds, which germinate after disturbance. Visitors to (and likely pollinators of) inflorescences include insects and a nocturnal mammal, the white-tailed dunnart.

== Description ==
Banksia grossa grows as a bushy shrub, generally 0.7 to 1 m (28 to 39 in) high, or occasionally up to 1.5 m (4.9 ft) high. Its many stems rise from a woody lignotuber. Young stems have a coating of woolly hairs, while older stems are covered in flaky pale brown bark. Borne on 3 to 5 mm long petioles, the somewhat fleshy leaves are needle-like. Although they are between 4 and 12 cm (1.5 and 4.5 in) long and only 2 to 3 mm wide, they are still thicker than those of other members of the series Abietinae. The margins of the leaves are straight with no teeth and rolled over, and the upper surfaces are sparsely hairy when young, but later hairless. New growth occurs in the spring and early summer.

=== Flowers ===
Flowers occur in a typical Banksia flower spike: an inflorescence made up of hundreds of small individual flowers, or florets, densely packed around (and completely obscuring) a woody cylindrical axis. In B. grossa, this axis is 5 to 7 cm (2 to 3 in) high with a diameter of 0.7–0.9 cm (0.28–0.35 in). From this, the florets radiate out laterally, giving the inflorescence a diameter of 8 or 9 cm (3 or 3.5 in). Flowers are rusty brown to golden brown, and consist of a hairy 3.4–4.5 cm (1.3–1.8 in) long tubular perianth which opens at maturity (anthesis) to release the dark red to purple style. 3.8–4.8 cm (1.5–1.9 in) long, the style extends past the perianth and is curved at the tip. The flower spikes arise from short thick branchlets running off larger stems, though some flower spikes are terminal (located at the ends of branches and more prominently displayed in the foliage).

Flowering occurs between March and September, though early flowering in December has been recorded. It takes five to eight weeks for a flower to develop from bud to the end of flowering. About three weeks before the flowers open, they develop a strong musky smell. The opening of flowers occurs sequentially, starting at the bottom of the inflorescence and sweeping through to the top over a period of around two weeks. At anthesis, the flowers produce copious quantities of nectar; indeed, some flowers produce so much that it drips to the ground. After flowering, the old florets wither and curl against the spike, giving it a hairy appearance. Now known as an infructescence, it is roughly ellipsoidal, 6 to 10 cm high (2.2–4 in) and 4 to 8 cm (1.5 to 3 in) wide. Up to 25 smooth, elliptical follicles develop on the spike, each containing up to two wide wedge-shaped winged seeds. One field study revealed, on average, eight follicles for each fertile cone. Initially covered in fine fur, these are 2 to 4.5 cm (0.79 to 1.77 in) long, 1–1.8 cm (0.39–0.71 in) high and jut out by 1–1.8 cm (0.39–0.71 in). The fur rubs off and they become smooth with wear, and generally remain closed until opened by fire.

=== Seeds ===
The seeds of Banksia grossa are the largest of all the species of the series Abietinae. Measuring 2.8–3.9 cm (1.1–1.5 in) long, they are made up of a cuneate (wedge-shaped) seed body, 1.4–1.8 cm (0.55–0.71 in) long by 0.4–0.9 cm (0.16–0.35 in) wide, and a 2.7–3.3 cm (1.1–1.3 in) wide wing. The woody separator is the same shape as the seed, with an impression where the seed body lies next to it. The bright green cotyledons are obovate and can be either convex or concave, measuring 1.6 to 2.2 cm long by 0.9 to 1.2 cm wide. These arise from a stocky seedling stem, known as the hypocotyl, which is reddish and covered in short hairs. The auricles of the cotyledons are 2 mm long. Seedling leaves arise 0.6 to 0.8 cm beyond the cotyledons and are oppositely arranged. Linear, they are 1.4 to 1.6 cm long with recurved margins and are covered in white hair. The stem remains reddish. Subsequent leaf pairs are successively longer.

== Taxonomy ==
The first known specimen collection of B. grossa was made by botanist Fred W. Humphreys in 1965. Alex George has expressed surprise that it was not collected by earlier visitors to the area, speculating that "perhaps they were diverted by its similarity to B. leptophylla and B. sphaerocarpa." George formally described the species in his 1981 monograph "The genus Banksia L.f. (Proteaceae)", based on a specimen collected by him on the Brand Highway, 76 km north of Regans Ford, on 14 May 1969. He placed it in subgenus Banksia because of its flower spike; section Oncostylis because its styles are hooked; and the resurrected series Abietinae, which he constrained to contain only round-fruited species. It was placed in phyletic order between B. micrantha and B. leptophylla. The specific epithet is from the Latin grossus ("coarse") and refers to the leaves, flowers, and fruit, all of which George observed were more coarse than other members of B. ser. Abietinae.

George's arrangement remained current until 1996, when Kevin Thiele and Pauline Ladiges published an arrangement informed by a cladistic analysis of morphological characteristics. They retained George's subgenera and many of his series, but discarded his sections. Banksia ser. Abietinae was found to be very nearly monophyletic, and so was retained. It further resolved into four subclades, so Thiele and Ladiges split it into four subseries. Banksia grossa appeared as the most basal member of the second of these:

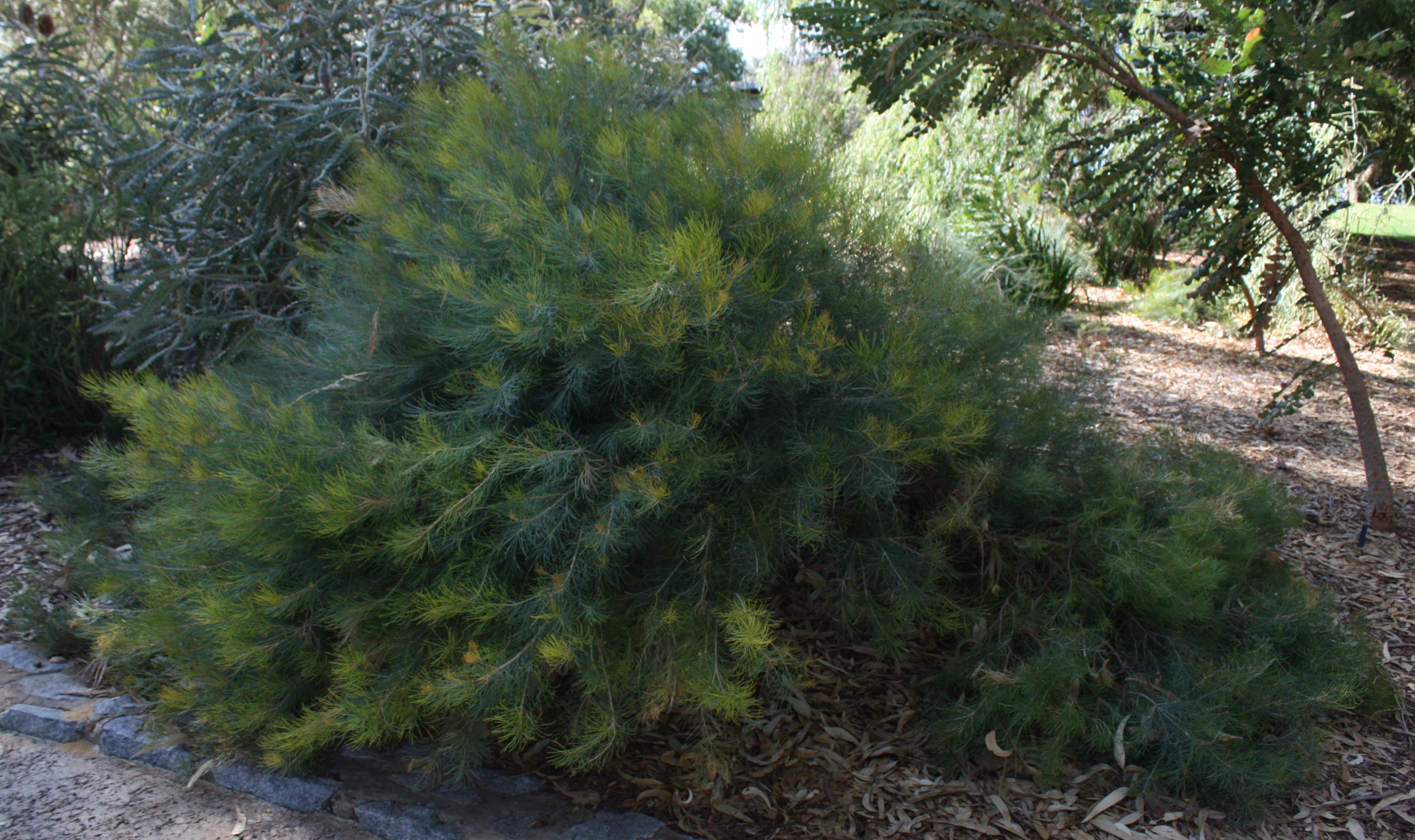
Typical shrubby habit, in cultivation, Kings Park, Perth, Western Australia

- B. grossa
- - B. scabrella
  - - B. dolichostyla
    - - B. micrantha
      - - B. sphaerocarpa var. sphaerocarpa
        - B. sphaerocarpa var. caesia

This clade became the basis for the new subseries Sphaerocarpae, which Thiele defined as containing those species with lignotubers, styles loosely curling around the infructescence (although this trait was reversed in B. micrantha), and "transversely aligned cells of the seed wing inner face". The species other than B. grossa also have shouldered follicles.

Questioning the emphasis on cladistics in Thiele and Ladiges' arrangement, George published a slightly modified version of his 1981 arrangement in his 1999 treatment of Banksia for the Flora of Australia series of monographs. The placement of B. grossa was the same as in 1981, except that B. telmatiaea was moved to set between it and B. leptophylla. The placement of B. grossa in George's 1999 arrangement may be summarised as follows:

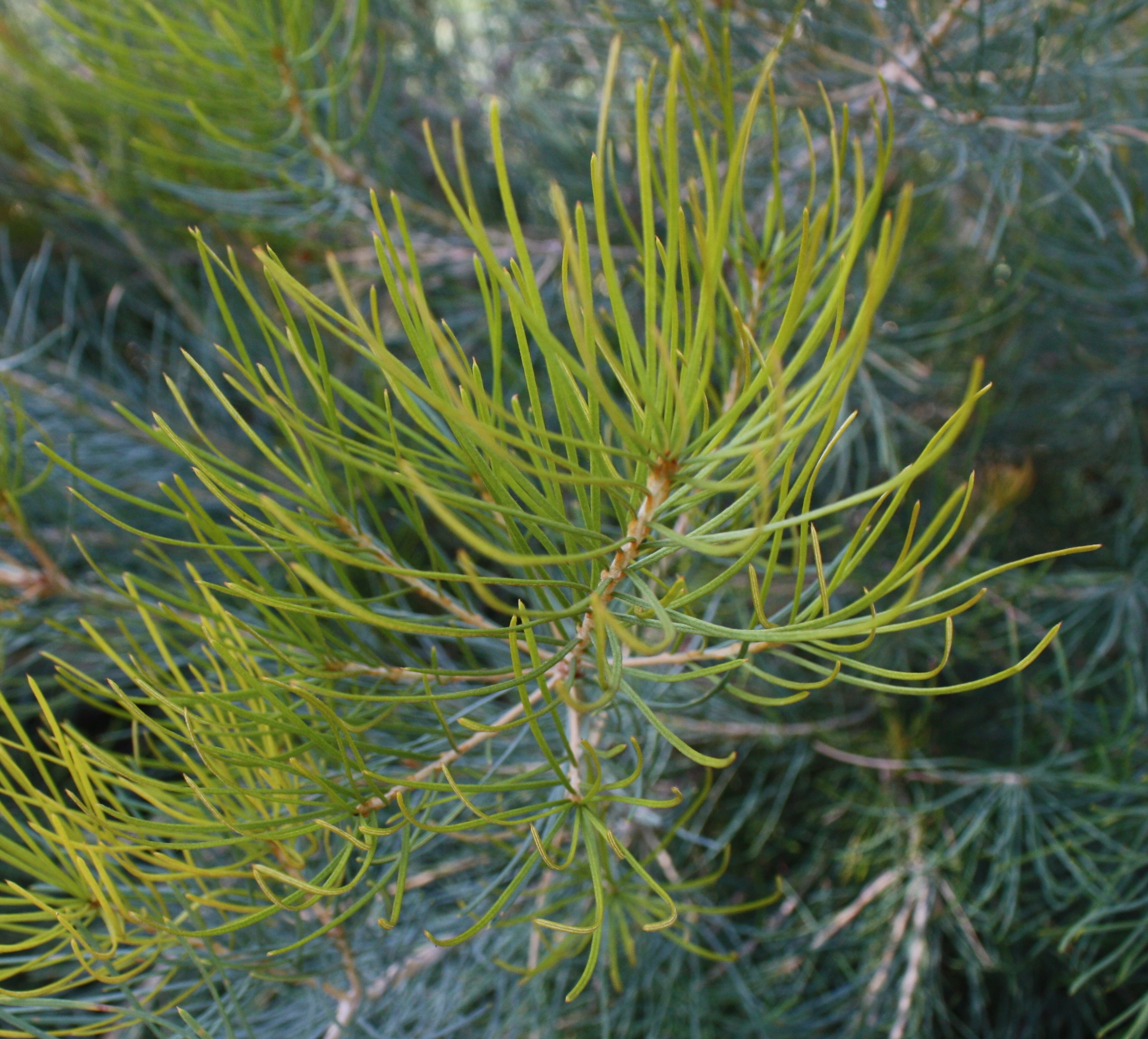
Foliage, highlighting new growth

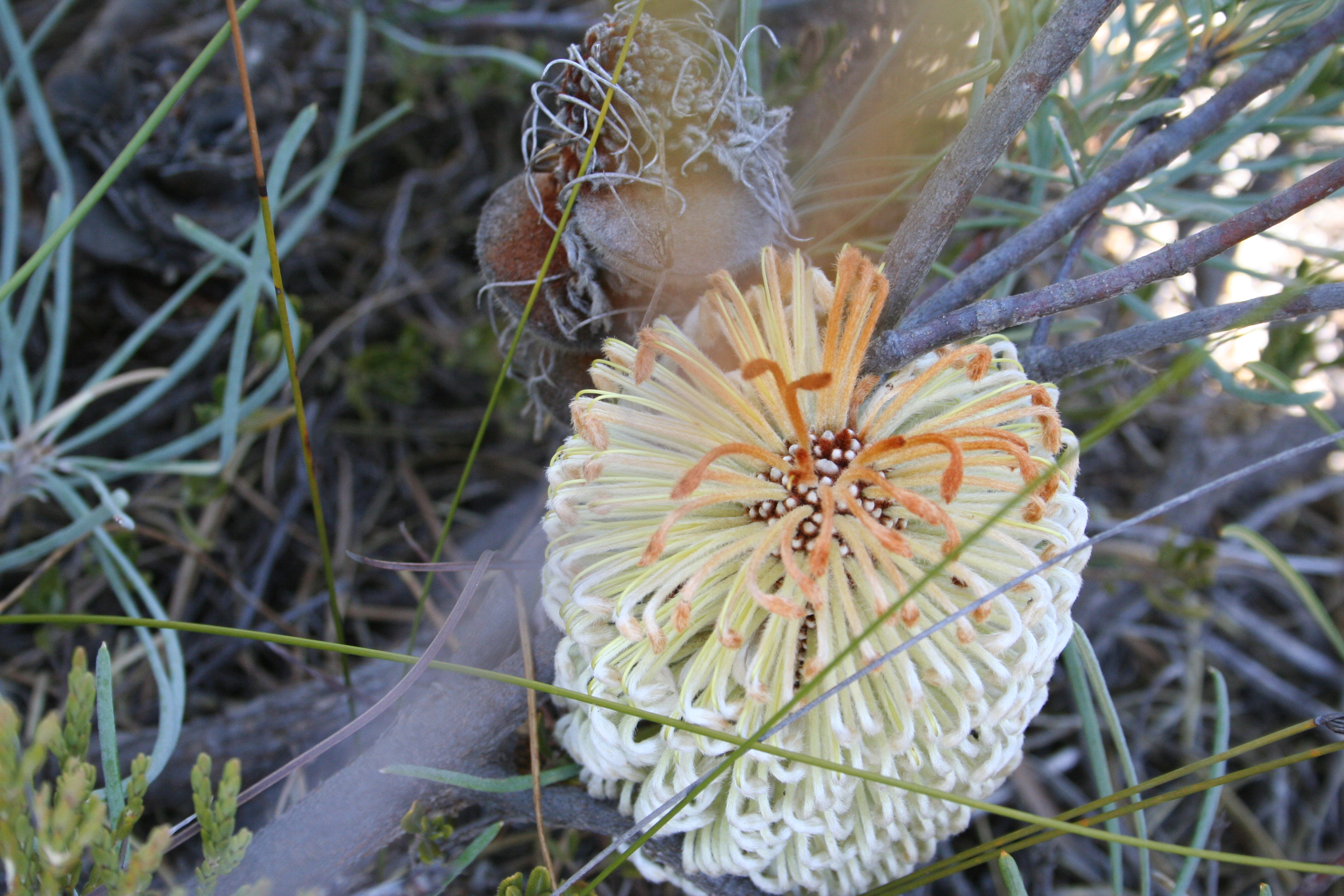
Inflorescence in early bud in front, old cone with follicles behind

Banksia

B. subg. Banksia

B. sect. Banksia (9 series, 50 species, 9 subspecies, 3 varieties)
B. sect. Coccinea (1 species)
B. sect. Oncostylis

B. ser. Spicigerae (7 species, 2 subspecies, 4 varieties)
B. ser. Tricuspidae (1 species)
B. ser. Dryandroideae (1 species)
B. ser. Abietinae

B. sphaerocarpa (5 varieties)
B. micrantha
B. grossa
B. telmatiaea
B. leptophylla (2 varieties)
B. lanata
B. scabrella
B. violacea
B. incana
B. laricina
B. pulchella
B. meisneri (2 subspecies)
B. nutans (2 varieties)

B. subg. Isostylis (3 species)

Since 1998, Austin Mast has been publishing results of ongoing cladistic analyses of DNA sequence data for the subtribe Banksiinae. His analyses suggest a phylogeny that is very different from George's arrangement. Banksia grossa was inferred to be sister to a polytomous clade consisting of B. leptophylla, B. telmatiaea, B. scabrella and B. lanata:

- - B. telmatiaea
  - B. scabrella
  - B. leptophylla var. melletica
  - B. leptophylla var. leptophylla
  - B. lanata
- B. grossa

Early in 2007, Mast and Thiele initiated a rearrangement of Banksia by merging Dryandra into it, and publishing B. subg. Spathulatae for the taxa having spoon-shaped cotyledons. They foreshadowed publishing a full arrangement once DNA sampling of Dryandra was complete; in the meantime, if Mast and Thiele's nomenclatural changes are taken as an interim arrangement, then B. grossa is placed in B. subg.. Spathulatae.

== Distribution and habitat ==
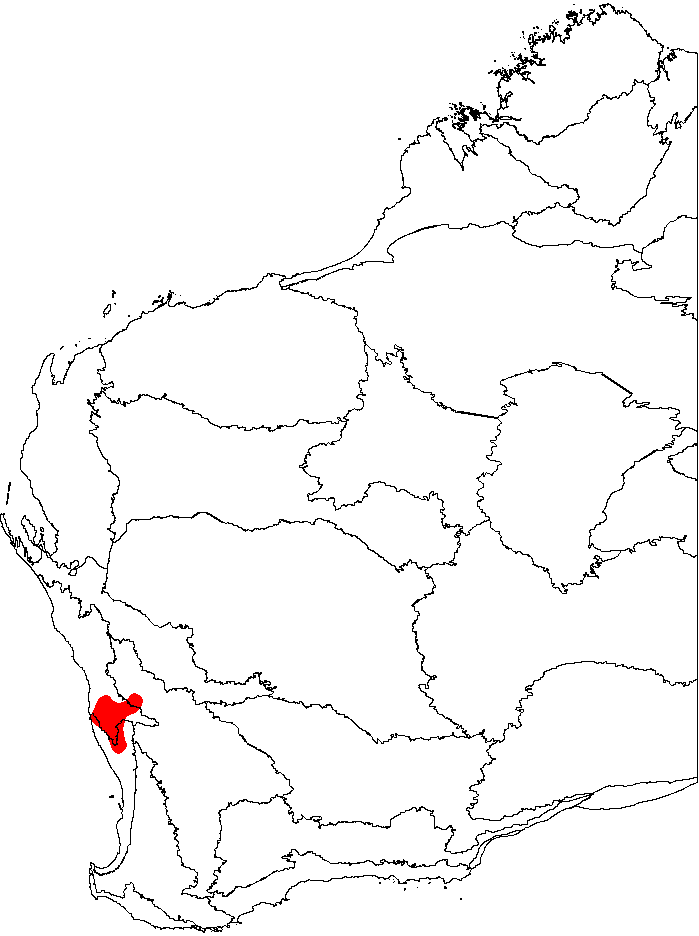
Distribution in Western Australia

Banksia grossa mainly occurs from west of Yandanooka in the north, south to Badgingarra National Park, and east almost to Coorow. It grows in shallow sand over laterite, in deep sand, and occasionally atop lateritic rises, on flat or gently undulating land, among kwongan shrubland. Around 40% of plants occur on road verges.

== Ecology ==
Banksia grossa resprouts from its woody lignotuber after bushfire. Shrubs carry relatively low numbers of seeds compared with plant species that regenerate by seed after bushfire. A field study in Eneabba showed shrubs bore anywhere from 30 to 90 seeds per plant. Seeds borne on plants, however, are less likely to be eaten by animals than seed lying dormant in the soil, and hence survive to produce future seedlings. Populations of resprouting plants, like B. grossa, benefit more from longer intervals between fires as their stored seedbank takes longer to accumulate than reseeding species. The follicles generally open after bushfire, releasing seeds which germinate after disturbance. Species with persistent flowers on old spikes often require higher temperatures for follicles to open after burning; laboratory testing resulted in 50% opening after exposure to 270 °C (518 °F) and 90% after 400 °C (750 °F).

The leaves of B. grossa are adapted to a dry climate. The lower surfaces are protected by the strongly revolute shape of the leaf, the leaf margins curling around underneath almost to the mid-vein. The trichomes (leaf hairs) run along the mid-vein and the margins, further protecting the surface where the stomates are located, thus minimising water loss. Cladistic analysis suggests this species and its relatives in the series Abietinae developed long narrow leaves with inrolled margins as they invaded drier climates in Australia's southwest, having evolved from ancestors with broad leaves.

The inflorescences are highly attractive to insects. The rare bee species Hylaeus globuliferus is a recorded visitor. Large numbers of ladybirds have been reported drinking the nectar of this species, while ignoring nearby Banksia attenuata inflorescences. The white-tailed dunnart (Sminthopsis granulipes) has been observed visiting flower spikes. Pollen has been found on the snouts and in the scat of several species of dasyurid marsupials, which suggests these animals are likely pollinators of Banksia species in general. No pollinators of this species were recorded in The Banksia Atlas survey.

Banksia grossa is one of five closely related Banksia species that have highly unusual flower nectar. (Note: The other four species are Banksia sphaerocarpa, B. incana, B. leptophylla and B. telmatiaea.) Whereas other Banksia species produce nectar that is clear and watery, the nectar of these species is pale yellow initially, but gradually becomes darker and thicker, changing to a thick, olive-green mucilage within one to two days of secretion, and eventually becoming "an almost black, gelatinous lump adhering to the base of the flowers". It was first noted by Byron Lamont in 1980; he attributed it to cyanobacteria that feed off the nectar sugars. Noting that many of these cyanobacteria had heterocysts, he speculated that they aid the plant by fixing atmospheric nitrogen, which is then washed off the flower heads by rain, and absorbed by the proteoid root mat. This purported symbiosis was investigated by Barrett and Lamont in 1985, but no evidence of nitrogen fixing was found. Further investigation by Markey and Lamont in 1996 suggested that the discolouration is not caused by cyanobacteria or other microorganisms in the nectar, but is rather "a chemical phenomenon of plant origin". Their analyses indicated that the nectar had unusually high levels of sugar and free amino acids, but three of these species, including B. sphaerocarpa, have since been shown to have normal nectar sugar compositions. The purpose of coloured nectar is unclear, especially as pollinators such as nocturnal mammals are not thought to forage by sight. However, nectar that becomes more obvious by appearance or smell as it ages might encourage pollinators to prioritise it over newer nectar. It is possible the colour change is unrelated to pollination.

== Use in horticulture ==
Banksia grossa is cultivated for its attractive needle-like leaves and rusty-brown flower spikes, both of which can be quite variable in colour. This species favours well-drained sandy or loamy acidic soils with a pH of 5.5 to 7, and a sunny aspect. Once established, it tolerates dry spells. It can be pruned heavily as it resprouts from its lignotuber.

Propagation is by seed. The seeds do not require any treatment before sowing, and take around 14 days to germinate. This is a slow-growing plant, taking 5 to 7 years to reach maturity and begin flowering.

== Cultural references ==
This banksia was featured on an Australian postage stamp in 2018.
