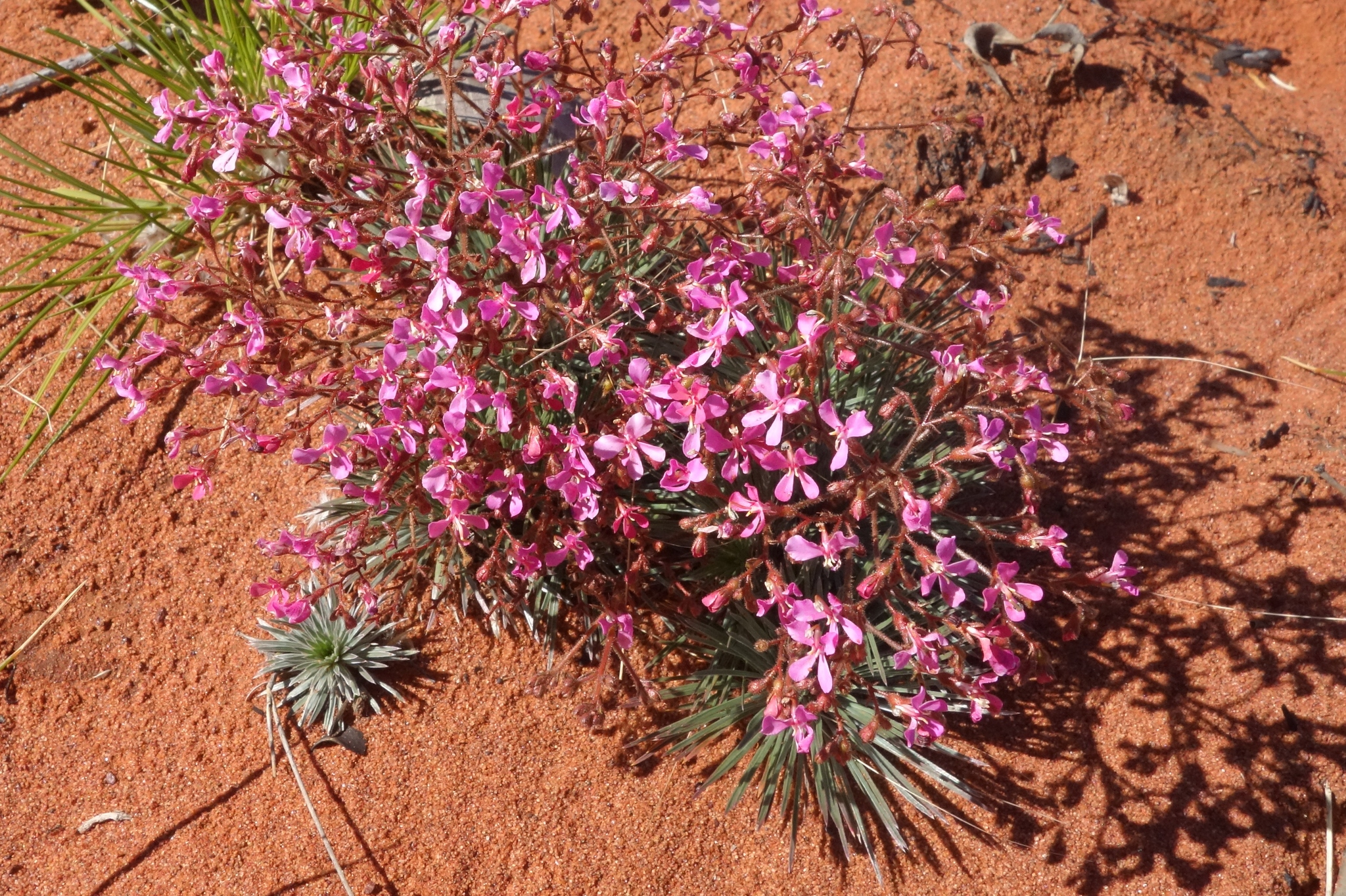

Scientific classification
- Kingdom: Plantae
- Clade: Tracheophytes
- Clade: Angiosperms
- Clade: Eudicots
- Clade: Asterids
- Order: Asterales
- Family: Stylidiaceae
- Genus: Stylidium
- Species: S. humphreysii

Binomial name
- Stylidium humphreysii Carlquist

= Stylidium humphreysii =

Species of flowering plant

Stylidium humphreysii is a species of trigger plant endemic to desert regions of Western Australia. American botanist Sherwin Carlquist named the species after West Australian amateur botanist Fred Humphreys.
