= Yule Brook Botany Reserve =

Botany reserve in Kenwick, Perth, Australia

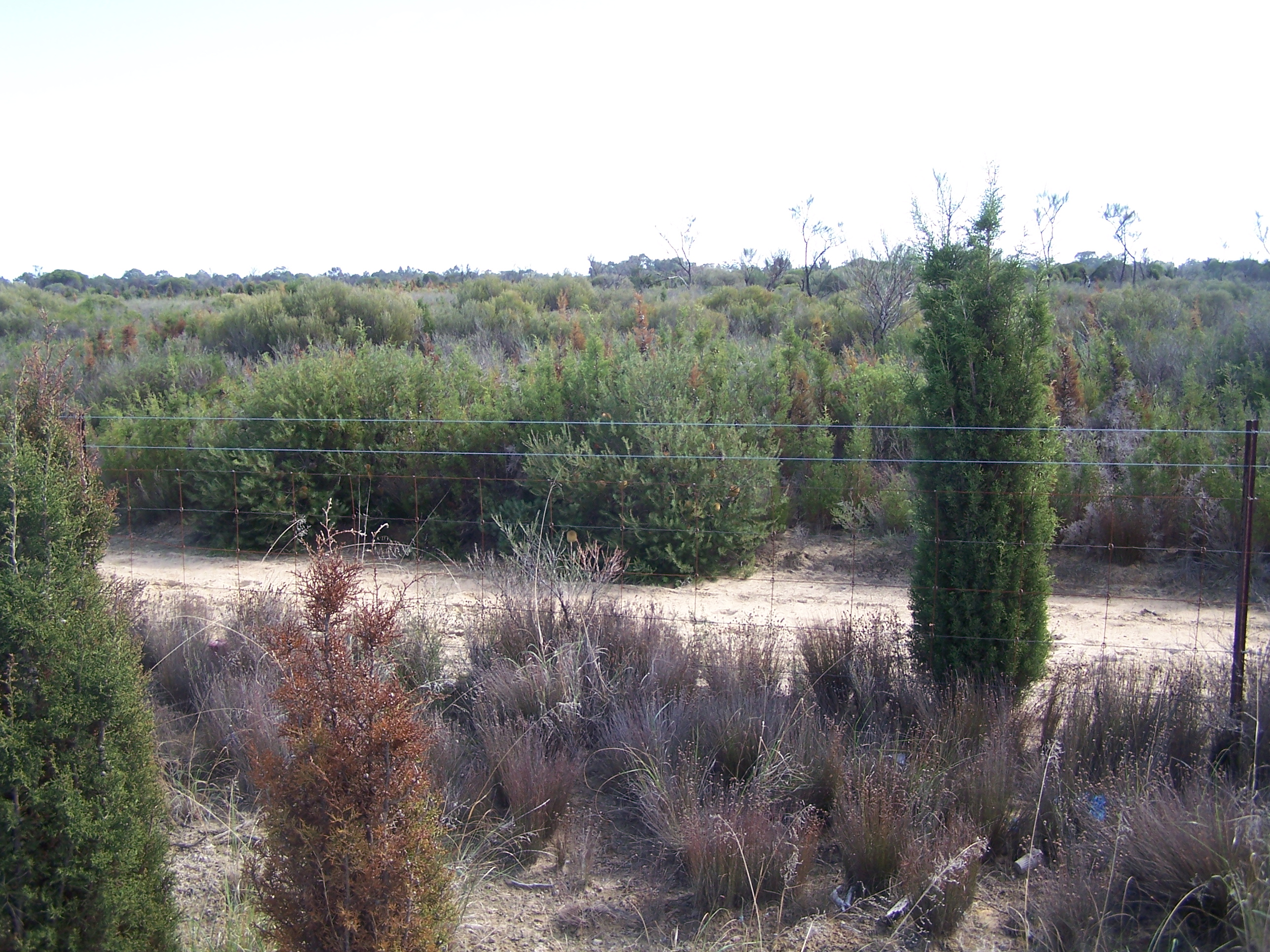
The Yule Brook Botany Reserve, showing fenceline, fire break, and typical vegetation, including Actinostrobus pyramidalis (Swamp Cypress) and Banksia telmatiaea (Swamp Fox Banksia)

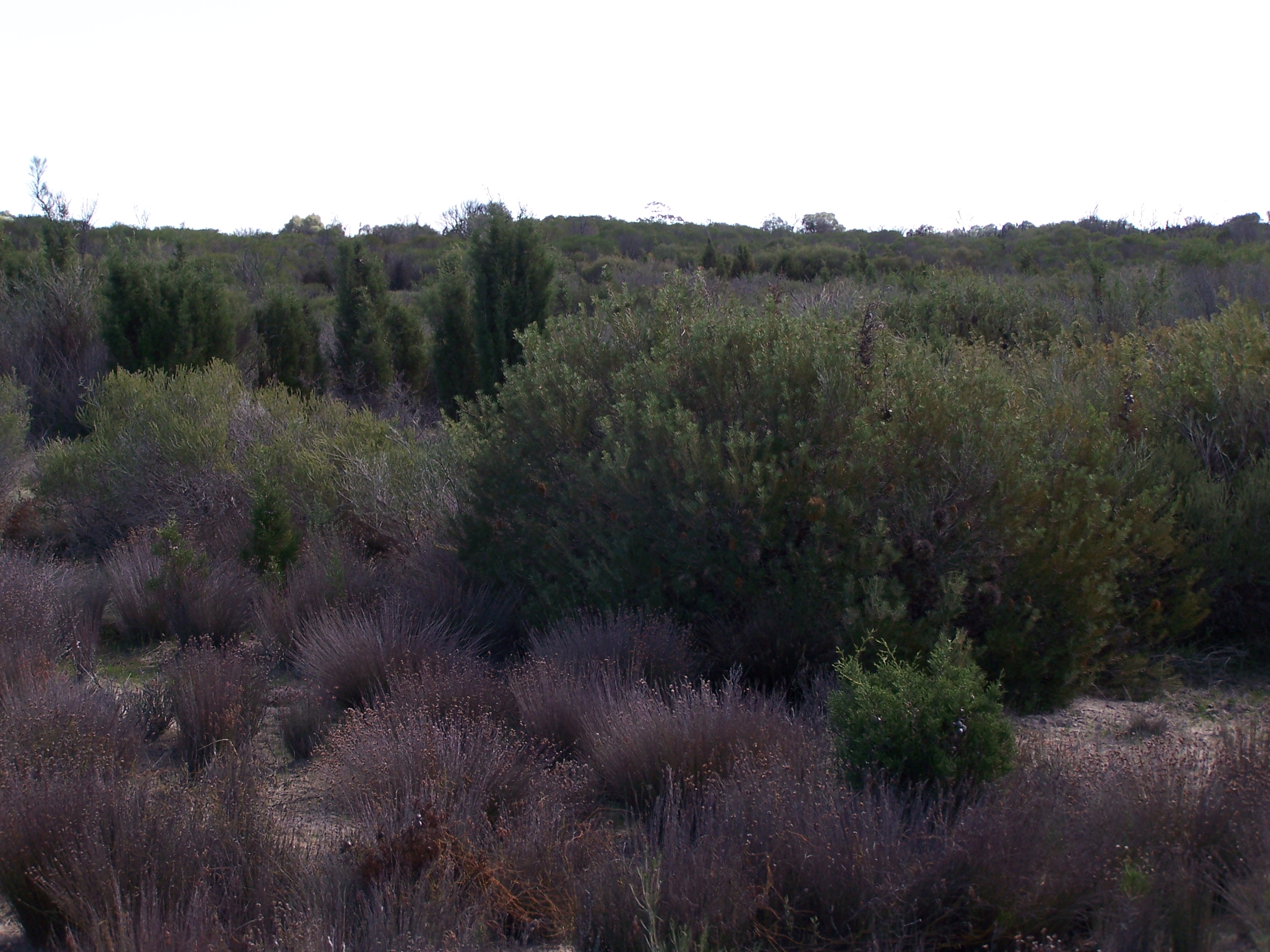
A vegetation community in the Yule Brook Botany Reserve

Yule Brook Botany Reserve, also known as Yule Brook Reserve and Cannington Swamps, is a 34.6-hectare (85-acre) parcel of land in the Perth, Western Australia suburb of Kenwick. It is owned by the University of Western Australia, and used by them for botanical research and teaching.

It was purchased by the university in 1949, and carefully surveyed the following year by botanist N. H. Speck. In 1979 it was gazetted as a reserve, ensuring that it cannot be developed without the approval of both the local council and the state government's metropolitan planning authority.

The site is especially valuable for botanical research, as it is located where two sand ridges cross a seasonally wet lowland. Hence there is a very great variety of habitats and vegetation within a small area. Numerous studies have been published based on experiments and observations in the reserve, and some species have been published based on type specimens collected within the reserve.
