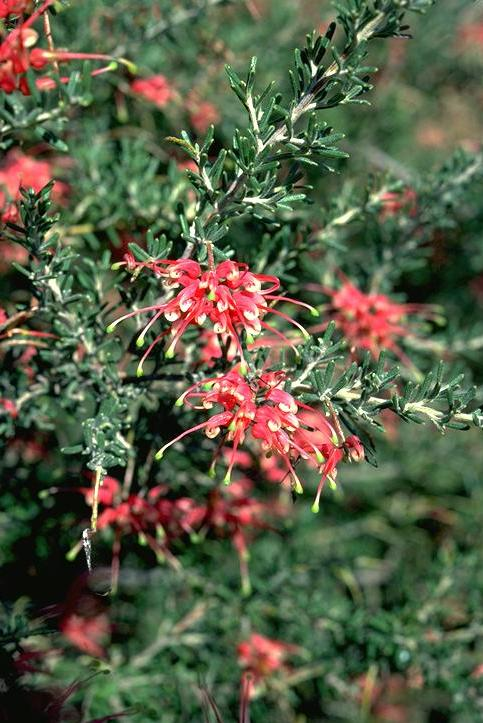

Conservation status
- Endangered (IUCN 3.1)

- Priority Three — Poorly Known Taxa (DEC)

Scientific classification
- Kingdom: Plantae
- Clade: Embryophytes
- Clade: Tracheophytes
- Clade: Angiosperms
- Clade: Eudicots
- Order: Proteales
- Family: Proteaceae
- Genus: Grevillea
- Species: G. hirtella

Binomial name
- Grevillea hirtella (Benth.) Olde & Marriott

Synonyms
- Grevillea pinaster var. hirtella Benth.; Grevillea thelemanniana subsp. hirtella (Benth.) McGill.

= Grevillea hirtella =

Species of shrub endemic to Western Australia

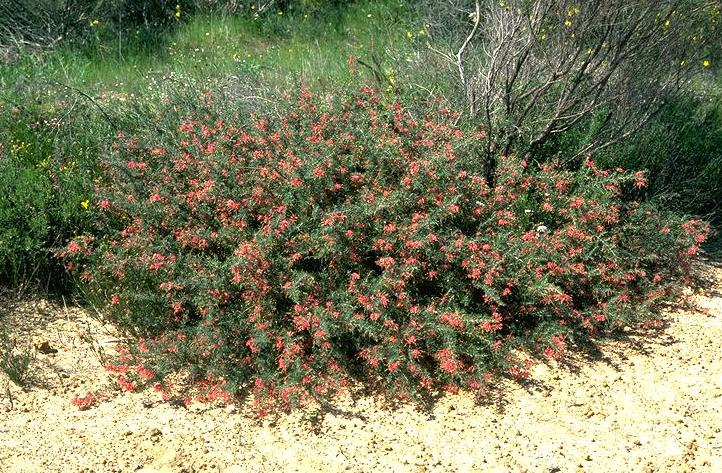
Habit in the Burma Road Nature Reserve

Grevillea hirtella is a species of flowering plant in the family Proteaceae and is endemic to the west of Western Australia. It is a spreading shrub with crowded linear and divided leaves and clusters of pale pink to deep red flowers.

== Description ==
Grevillea hirtella is a spreading shrub that typically grows to up to 1 m (3 ft 3 in) high and 2.5 m (8 ft 2 in) wide and has hairy branchlets. Its leaves are crowded, some leaves linear, 6–20 mm (0.24–0.79 in) long, some divided with two or three lobes 1.5–8 mm (0.059–0.315 in) long and 1.0–1.5 mm (0.039–0.059 in) long. The upper surface of the leaves is more or less glabrous and the edges are rolled under, obscuring the lower surface. The flowers are arranged in down-turned clusters of ten to sixteen on a rachis 5–13 mm (0.20–0.51 in) long. The flowers are pale pink to deep pinkish red, the style with a green tip, the pistil 20–25 mm (0.79–0.98 in) long. Flowering mainly occurs from August to November and the fruit is an oblong to elliptic follicle 12–13 mm (0.47–0.51 in) long.

== Taxonomy ==
This grevillea was first formally described in 1870 by George Bentham who gave it the name Grevillea pinaster var. hirtella in Flora Australiensis from specimens collected by Pemberton Walcott near Champion Bay. In 1994, Peter M. Olde and Neil R. Marriott raised the variety to species status as Grevillea hirtella in The Grevillea Book. The specific epithet (hirtella) means "somewhat hairy".

== Distribution and habitat ==
Grevillea hirtella grows in open heathland on sandy or loamy soils of up to 200 m (660 ft) above sea level in scattered populations between Mingenew and Walkaway in the Avon Wheatbelt and Geraldton Sandplains bioregions of Western Australia. It is limited to an estimated extent of occurrence of 3,000 km^{2} (1,200 sq mi).

== Conservation status ==
Grevillea hirtella is currently listed as endangered on the IUCN Red List of Threatened Species and as priority three by the Government of Western Australia Department of Biodiversity, Conservation and Attractions, meaning that it is poorly known and known from only a few locations but is not under imminent threat.

This species has lost much of its population and habitat through land clearing for agriculture and road development. It is now mainly restricted to road verges, where it is threatened by verge clearing and competition with weeds, including both native and invasive species.

== See also ==
- List of Grevillea species
