= Fred Humphreys =

Frederick William Humphreys
- Born: 11 November 1907; Kalgoorlie, Australia
- Died: 3 September 1967 (aged 59)
- Monuments: Humphreys House; The F.W. Humphreys Perpetual Trophy; Stylidium humphreysii
- Other name: Fred
- Education: University of Western Australia
- Occupation: Government official
- Known for: Botany
- Notable work: The Banksia Book

Frederick William Humphreys (11 November 1907 – 3 September 1967) was an Australian government official and an amateur photographer and botanist whose work culminated in the posthumous publication of The Banksia Book, a book on the flowering plant genus Banksia. He discovered Banksia grossa in the Stirling Range in 1967.

== Life and career ==
Humphreys was born in Kalgoorlie. He attended University of Western Australia, where he participated in track and running events. He graduated with a Diploma in Commerce in 1934. He took a position with the Commonwealth Public Service in Immigration and Social Services. He later returned to Western Australia as State Director of Social Services.

Both Humphreys and his wife Evelyn were keen members of the Wildflower Society of Western Australia. Author Alex George said Humphreys conceived the idea of a series of popular books on plants such as Banksias, Dryandras, and Verticordias, and endeavoured to photograph every species of Banksia. However, he died before he could accomplish this. His enthusiasm prompted George to finish a book on banksias, after the conclusion of his monograph "The genus Banksia L.f. (Proteaceae)". Humphreys donated his slides of flowers to the Western Australian Herbarium and the Australian National Botanic Gardens.

At the time of his death the Social Services Department was located in the building which bore his name, Humphreys House. The F.W. Humphreys Perpetual Trophy at UWA is named in his honor. American botanist Sherwin Carlquist named a triggerplant from the Great Victoria Desert, Stylidium humphreysii, in his honour in 1969.
