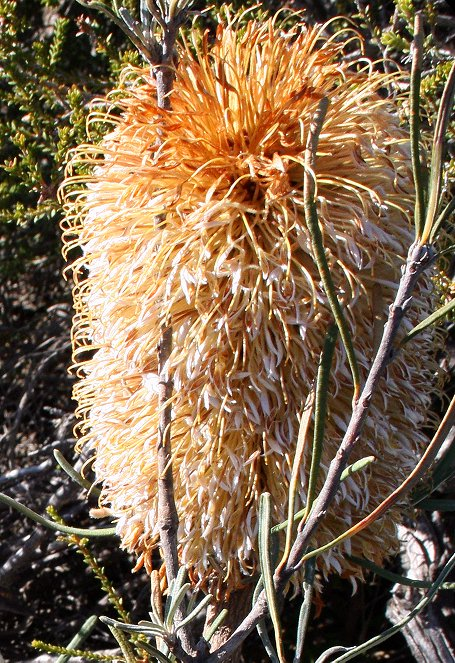
- Banksia grossa (Coarse Banksia), a species of B. subser. Sphaerocarpae

Scientific classification
- Kingdom: Plantae
- Clade: Tracheophytes
- Clade: Angiosperms
- Clade: Eudicots
- Order: Proteales
- Family: Proteaceae
- Genus: Banksia
- Subgenus: Banksia subg. Banksia
- Section: Banksia sect. Oncostylis
- Series: Banksia ser. Abietinae
- Subseries: Banksia subser. Sphaerocarpae; K.R.Thiele

= Banksia subser. Sphaerocarpae =

Subseries of plant

Banksia subser. Sphaerocarpae is a valid botanic name for a subseries of Banksia. It was published by Kevin Thiele in 1996, but discarded by Alex George in 1999.

== Cladistics ==
The name came about after a cladistic analysis of Banksia by Thiele and Pauline Ladiges yielded a phylogeny somewhat at odds with the accepted taxonomic arrangement, prompting them to publish a revised arrangement. Their cladogram contained a clade that corresponded closely to George's B. ser. Abietinae. This clade resolved into four subclades, for which Thiele published four corresponding subseries. B. subser. Sphaerocarpae was based upon the third subclade:

- B. grossa
- - B. sphaerocarpa var. dolichostyla
  - - B. micrantha
    - - B. sphaerocarpa var. sphaerocarpa
      - B. sphaerocarpa var. caesia

== Taxonomy ==
B. subser. Sphaerocarpae was formally defined as containing those taxa with "seeds with transversely aligned cells on the inner face on the inner face of the wing,... and old styles that curl loosely around the infructescence." In addition, all species except B. grossa have a papery interseminal plate. The epithet Sphaerocarpae is taken from the specific epithet of the type species, B. sphaerocarpa (Fox Banksia).

The wide phyletic separation of B. sphaerocarpa var. dolichostyla (Ironcap Banksia) from the other varieties of B. sphaerocarpa prompted Thiele to promote it to species rank as B. dolichostyla.

The placement and circumscription of B. subser. Leptophyllae in Thiele and Ladiges' arrangement may be summarised as follows:

Banksia

B. subg. Isostylis (3 species)
B. elegans (incertae sedis)
B. subg. Banksia

B. ser. Tetragonae (4 species)
B. ser. Lindleyanae (1 species)
B. ser. Banksia (2 subseries, 12 species)
B. baueri (incertae sedis)
B. lullfitzii (incertae sedis)
B. attenuata (incertae sedis)
B. ashbyi (incertae sedis)
B. coccinea (incertae sedis)
B. ser. Prostratae (8 species)
B. ser. Cyrtostylis (4 species)
B. ser. Ochraceae (3 species, 2 subspecies)
B. ser. Grandes (2 species)
B. ser. Salicinae (2 subseries, 11 species, 4 subspecies)
B. ser. Spicigerae (3 subseries, 7 species, 6 varieties)
B. ser. Quercinae (2 species)
B. ser. Dryandroideae (1 species)
B. ser. Abietinae

B. subser. Nutantes (1 species, 2 varieties)
B. subser. Sphaerocarpae

B. grossa
B. dolichostyla (now B. sphaerocarpa var. dolichostyla)
B. micrantha
B. sphaerocarpa

B. s. var. sphaerocarpa
B. s. var. caesia

B. subser. Leptophyllae (4 species, 2 varieties)
B. subser. Longistyles (6 species, 2 varieties)

Thiele and Ladiges' arrangement remained current only until 1999, when George's treatment of the genus for the Flora of Australia series of monographs was published. This was essentially a revision of George's 1981 arrangement, which took into account some of Thiele and Ladiges' data, but rejected their overall arrangement. B. subser. Sphaerocarpae was discarded, as were the other three subseries of B. ser. Abietinae, and B. dolichostyla was once more demoted to a variety of B. sphaerocarpa.

== Recent developments ==
Since 1998, Austin Mast has been publishing results of ongoing cladistic analyses of DNA sequence data for the subtribe Banksiinae, which suggest a phylogeny that is rather different from previous taxonomic arrangements. His results suggest that B. subser. Sphaerocarpae is polyphyletic: B. micrantha, B. sphaerocarpa var. sphaerocarpa and B. sphaerocarpa var. caesia together form a clade, but B. grossa appears more closely related to the members of Thiele's B. subser. Leptophyllae, and B. dolichostyla falls into a clade with B. violacea (Violet Banksia), B. laricina (Rose-fruited Banksia) and B. incana (Hoary Banksia).

Early in 2007 Mast and Thiele initiated a rearrangement of Banksia by transferring Dryandra into it, and publishing B. subg. Spathulatae for the species having spoon-shaped cotyledons. All members of subseries Sphaerocarpae fall within Mast and Thiele's B. subg. Spathulatae, but nothing further has been published. Mast and Thiele have foreshadowed publishing a full arrangement once DNA sampling of Dryandra is complete.
