= Burma Road Nature Reserve =

Nature reserve in Western Australia

- IUCN category Ia (strict nature reserve)
- Location within Western Australia
- Location: Western Australia
- Nearest city: Geraldton
- Coordinates: 28.948°S 115.093°E
- Area: 6,888 ha (26.59 sq mi)
- Established: 1963
- Governing body: Department of Biodiversity, Conservation and Attractions

Burma Road Nature Reserve is a conservation area in the City of Greater Geraldton local government area of Western Australia. It lies 52 kilometres (32 mi) south of Geraldton and 20 kilometres (12 mi) east of Walkaway. It is a C-class reserve and covers an area of 6,889.5 hectares (17,024 acres). It is predominantly kwongan scrub-heath, typical of the Tathra Vegetation system of Beard and Burns. Almost all the native vegetation within a 20 km (12 mi) radius of the reserve has been cleared. There is only 11% of native vegetation remaining in the area of 1,256.6 km^{2} (485.2 sq mi), of which most is within the reserve.

Notable species in the reserve include Grevillea hirtella.
