= Styphelia marginata =

Conservation status
- Endangered (EPBC Act)

- Declared rare (DEC)

Scientific classification
- Kingdom: Plantae
- Clade: Tracheophytes
- Clade: Angiosperms
- Clade: Eudicots
- Clade: Asterids
- Order: Ericales
- Family: Ericaceae
- Genus: Styphelia
- Species: S. marginata

Binomial name
- Styphelia marginata (W.Fitzg.) Hislop, Crayn & Puente-Lel.
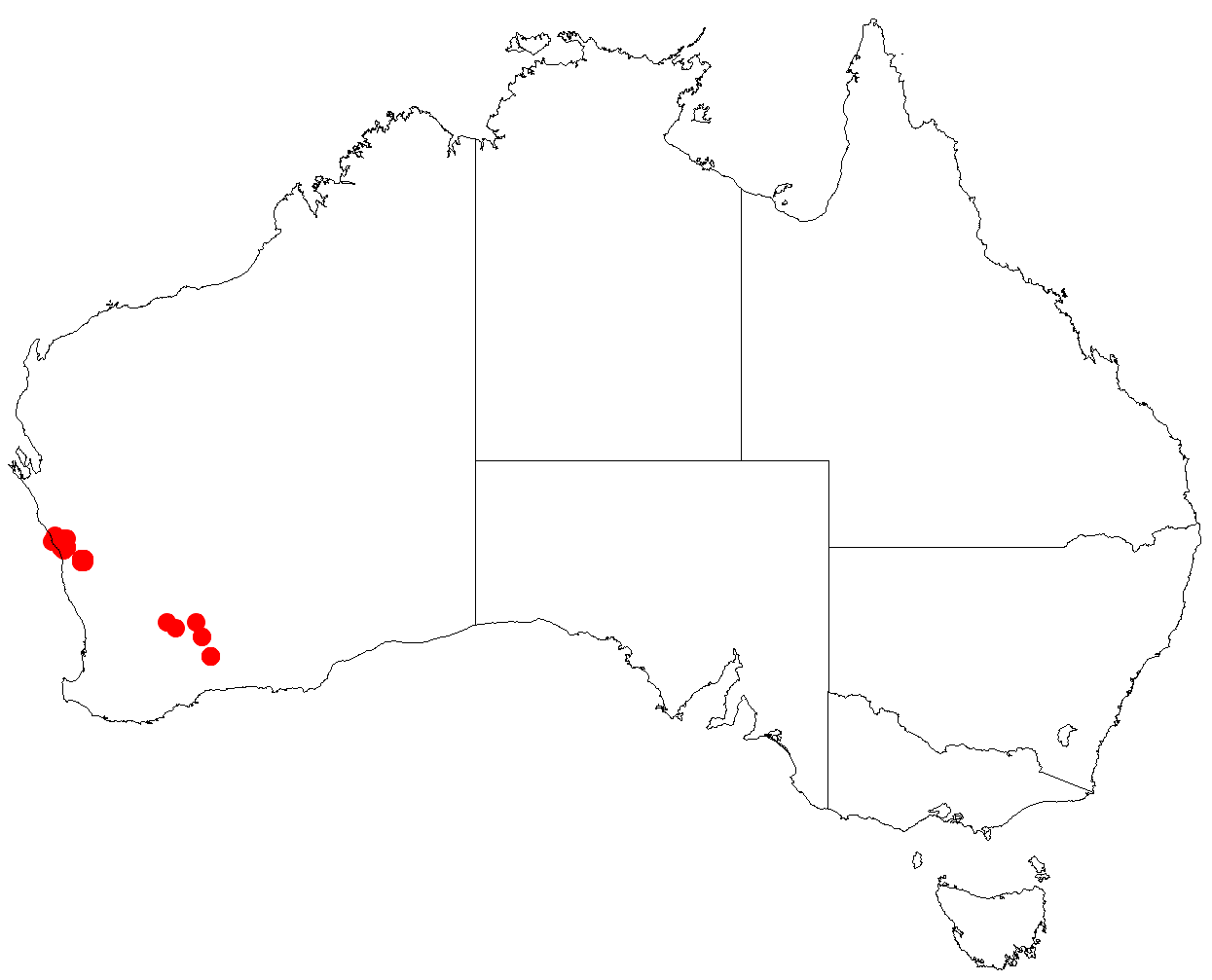
- Occurrence data from AVH

Synonyms
- Leucopogon marginatus W.Fitzg.

Species of shrub

Styphelia marginata, commonly known as thick-margined leucopogon, is a species of flowering plant in the heath family Ericaceae and is endemic to the south-west of Western Australia. It is a dwarf shrub with lance-shaped leaves and white, tube-shaped flowers.

== Description ==
Styphelia marginata is a dwarf shrub that typically grows to a height of 40–60 cm (16–24 in) and has glabrous new growth. The leaves are lance-shaped, 4–6 mm (0.16–0.24 in) long with a short petiole, and are sharply pointed. The leaves have a stem-clasping base and membraneous edges. The flowers are white, arranged singly or in groups of up to 3 in upper leaf axils with a bracteole about one-third the length of the sepals. The sepals are broadly lance-shaped, 2.0–2.6 mm (0.079–0.102 in) long. The petals are joined at the base, forming a tube slightly longer than the sepals, and have 5 bearded lobes but with glabrous tips. The style is slightly longer than the petal tube.

== Taxonomy ==
This species was first formally described in 1904 by William Vincent Fitzgerald who gave it the name Leucopogon marginatus in the Journal of the West Australian Natural History Society from specimens he collected on sand plains near Arrino in 1903.

In 2020, Hislop, Crayn and Puente-Lel. transferred L. marginatus to Styphelia as S. marginata in the journal Australian Systematic Botany. As at February 2023, the name Styphelia marginata is accepted by the Herbarium of Western Australia and by Plants of the World Online. The Australian Plant Census list S. marginata as a synonym as L. marginatus.

The specific epithet (marginata) means "furnished with a border", referring to the margins of the leaves.

== Distribution ==
This species occurs in the Avon Wheatbelt and Geraldton Sandplains bioregions of south-western Western Australia.

== Conservation status ==
Leucopogon marginatus is listed as "endangered" under the Australian Government Environment Protection and Biodiversity Conservation Act 1999 and a recovery plan has been prepared. Styphelia marginata is classified as "Threatened" by the Western Australian Government Department of Biodiversity, Conservation and Attractions, meaning that it is in danger of extinction. The main threats to the species include inappropriate fire regimes, grazing by livestock and weed invasion.
