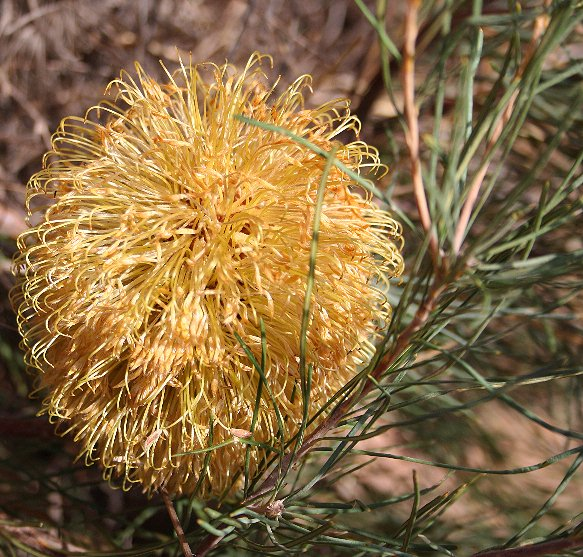
- var. leptophylla Burma Road

Scientific classification
- Kingdom: Plantae
- Clade: Tracheophytes
- Clade: Angiosperms
- Clade: Eudicots
- Order: Proteales
- Family: Proteaceae
- Genus: Banksia
- Subgenus: Banksia subg. Banksia
- Species: B. leptophylla

Binomial name
- Banksia leptophylla A.S.George

Synonyms
- Banksia pinifolia Meisn. nom. illeg., nom. superfl.; Banksia sphaerocarpa var. major Fairall nom. inval., nom. nud.; Banksia sphaerocarpa var. pinifolia Blackall nom. inval., nom. nud.

= Banksia leptophylla =

Species of shrub native to Western Australia

Banksia leptophylla is a species of shrub that is endemic to the south-west of Western Australia. It has narrow linear leaves, heads of yellow or pale brown flowers with a yellow or purple style and later, up to eight egg-shaped follicles in each head.

== Description ==
Banksia leptophylla is a much-branched shrub that typically grows to 2 m (6 ft 7 in) tall and 3 m (9.8 ft) wide but does not form a lignotuber. It has narrow linear leaves 40–100 mm (1.6–3.9 in) long and 1–1.5 mm (0.039–0.059 in) wide on a petiole 1–2 mm (0.039–0.079 in) long. The flowers are borne on a head 30–100 mm (1.2–3.9 in) long on a short side branch. The flowers are pale yellow or pale brown with a perianth 33–45 mm (1.3–1.8 in) long and hooked pistil 34–58 mm (1.3–2.3 in) long. Flowering occurs from January to December and the follicles are elliptic, in heads of eighty or more, each follicle 15–30 mm (0.59–1.18 in) long, 5–12 mm (0.20–0.47 in) high and 6–10 mm (0.24–0.39 in) wide.

== Taxonomy and naming ==
Banksia leptophylla was first formally described in 1981 by Alex George in the journal Nuytsia. George's description was based on Carl Meisner's Banksia pinifolia, an illegitimate name because the name had already been used by Salisbury for a different species. The lectotype was an earlier specimen collected by James Drummond. The specific epithet (leptophylla) is derived from the Ancient Greek words leptos, meaning "fine" or "slender" and phyllon, meaning "a leaf".

In 1988, George described two varieties of this species in the journal Nuytsia and the names are accepted by the Australian Plant Census:

- Banksia leptophylla A.S.George var. leptophylla that flowers in summer and autumn and has a perianth 42–47 mm (1.7–1.9 in) long;
- Banksia leptophylla var. melletica A.S.George that flowers in winter and has a shorter perianth than the autonym.

Before Alex George's revision of 1981, this species was labelled informally as B. sphaerocarpa var. pinifolia or var. major.

== Distribution and habitat ==
Variety leptophylla grows in shrubland and kwongan between Tathra National Park and Moora and var. melletica grows in kwongan near the coast between Kalbarri and Guilderton.

== Ecology ==
Banksia leptophylla is one of five Banksia species, all closely related to B. sphaerocarpa, that have highly unusual flower nectar. (Note: The other four species are Banksia grossa, B. incana, B. telmatiaea and B. sphaerocarpa.) Whereas other Banksia species produce nectar that is clear and watery, the nectar of these species is pale yellow initially, but gradually becomes darker and thicker, changing to a thick, olive-green mucilage within one to two days of secretion, and eventually becoming "an almost black, gelatinous lump adhering to the base of the flowers". It was first noted by Byron Lamont in 1980; he attributed it to cyanobacteria that feed off the nectar sugars. Noting that many of these cyanobacteria had heterocysts, he speculated that they aid the plant by fixing atmospheric nitrogen, which is then washed off the flower heads by rain, and absorbed by the proteoid root mat. This purported symbiosis was investigated by Barrett and Lamont in 1985, but no evidence of nitrogen fixing was found. Further investigation by Markey and Lamont in 1996 suggested that the discolouration is not caused by cyanobacteria or other microorganisms in the nectar, but is rather "a chemical phenomenon of plant origin". Their analyses indicated that the nectar had unusually high levels of sugar and free amino acids, but three of these species, including B. leptophylla, have since been shown to have normal nectar sugar compositions.

An assessment of the potential impact of climate change on B. leptophylla found that its range is unlikely to contract and may actually grow, depending on the severity of the change and how effectively the species migrates into newly habitable areas.

== Conservation status ==
Both varieties of B. leptophylla are classified as "not threatened" by the Western Australian Government Department of Parks and Wildlife.
