= Mount Adams (Western Australia) =

Highest point
- Elevation: 258 m (846 ft)

Geography
- Country: Australia
- State: Western Australia

Mount Adams is a mountain in Western Australia. Its elevation is 258 metres (846 ft).
