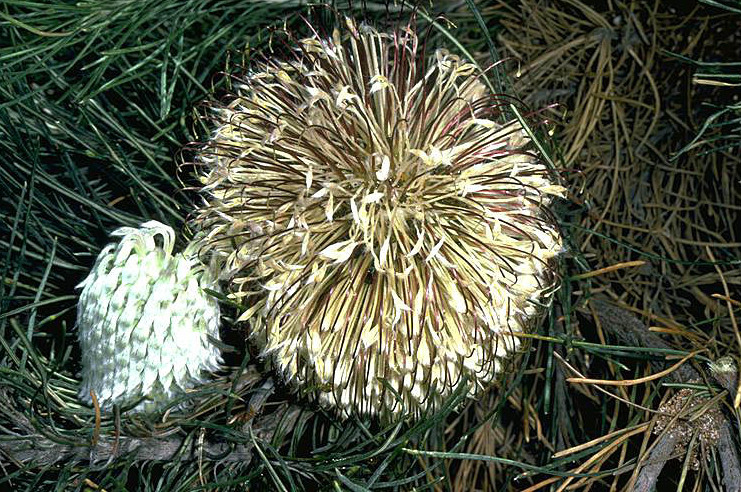
- Banksia lanata at Coomallo

Scientific classification
- Kingdom: Plantae
- Clade: Tracheophytes
- Clade: Angiosperms
- Clade: Eudicots
- Order: Proteales
- Family: Proteaceae
- Genus: Banksia
- Subgenus: Banksia subg. Banksia
- Species: B. lanata

Binomial name
- Banksia lanata A.S.George

= Banksia lanata =

Species of shrub endemic to Western Australia

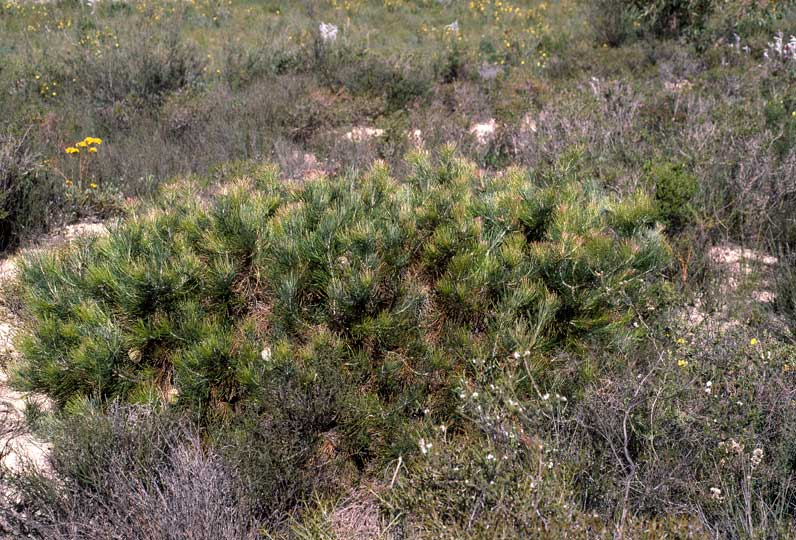
Habit near Eneabba

Banksia lanata is a species of shrub that is endemic to a restricted area of Western Australia. It has linear leaves, pale cream-coloured flowers in a head with whitish bracts at the base and later up to fifty elliptical follicles in each head.

== Description ==
Banksia lanata is a spreading shrub that typically grows to a height of 1 m (3 ft 3 in) with hairy stems but that does not form a lignotuber. It has crowded, linear leaves that are 30–100 mm (1.2–3.9 in)long, about 1 mm (0.039 in) wide on a petiole 3–4 mm (0.12–0.16 in) long and hairy when young. The flowers are arranged in a head 30–50 mm (1.2–2.0 in) long with woolly-hairy, whitish involucral bracts at the base. The flowers are pale cream-coloured, sometimes pale brown with a purple style and have a hairy perianth 32–38 mm (1.3–1.5 in) long and hooked pistil 38–48 mm (1.5–1.9 in) long. Flowering occurs from October to December or January and the follicles are elliptical, 12–30 mm (0.47–1.18 in) long, 4–11 mm (0.16–0.43 in) high and 6–12 mm (0.24–0.47 in) wide. Up to fifty follicles form in each head and remain closed until the plant is killed by fire.

== Taxonomy and naming ==
Banksia lanata was first formally described in 1981 by Alex George in the journal Nuytsia from specimens he collected east of Eneabba in 1971. The specific epithet (lanata) is a Latin word meaning "woolly", referring to the hairs on the bracts.

== Distribution and habitat ==
This banksia is restricted to an area between Arrowsmith Lake, Coomallo Creek and Tathra National Park in the Geraldton Sandplains biogeographic region where it is relatively common.

== Conservation status ==
Banksia lanata is classified as "not threatened" by the Western Australian Government Department of Parks and Wildlife.
