= Banksia leptophylla var. melletica =

Scientific classification
- Kingdom: Plantae
- Clade: Tracheophytes
- Clade: Angiosperms
- Clade: Eudicots
- Order: Proteales
- Family: Proteaceae
- Genus: Banksia
- Species: B. leptophylla
- Variety: B. l. var. melletica

Trinomial name
- Banksia leptophylla var. melletica A.S.George

Variety of flowering plant

Banksia leptophylla var. melletica is a variety of Banksia leptophylla. It is native to the Southwest Botanical Province of Western Australia.
