= Banksia leptophylla var. leptophylla =

Scientific classification
- Kingdom: Plantae
- Clade: Tracheophytes
- Clade: Angiosperms
- Clade: Eudicots
- Order: Proteales
- Family: Proteaceae
- Genus: Banksia
- Species: B. leptophylla A.S.George
- Variety: B. l. var. leptophylla

Trinomial name
- Banksia leptophylla var. leptophylla

Variety of shrub

Banksia leptophylla var. leptophylla is a variety of Banksia leptophylla. It is native to the Southwest Botanical Province of Western Australia. As an autonym, it is defined as containing the type specimen of the species.
