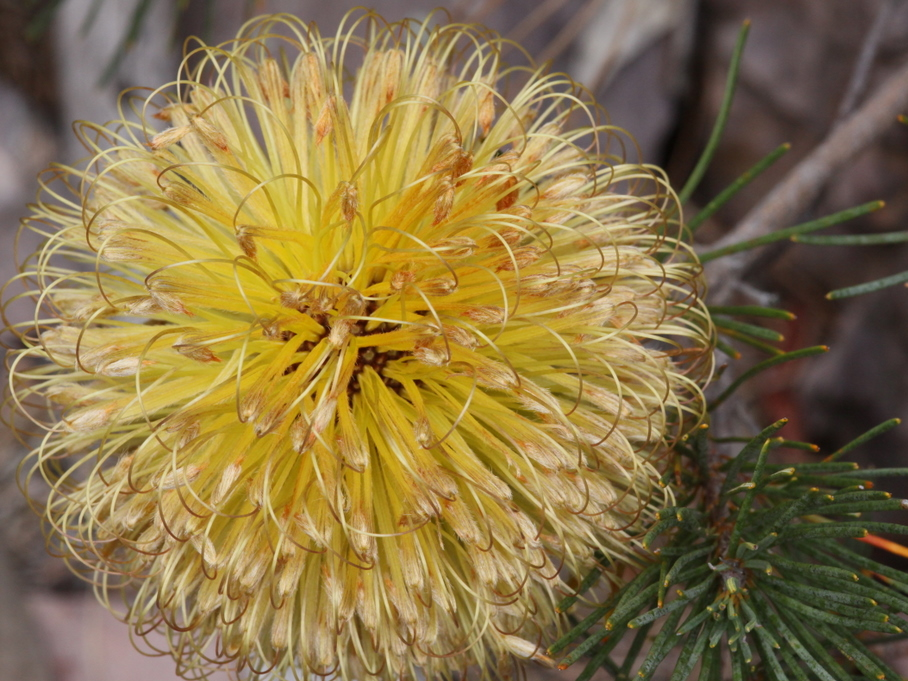
- B. sphaerocarpa var. sphaerocarpa at Stirling Range National Park

Conservation status
- Vulnerable (IUCN 3.1)

Scientific classification
- Kingdom: Plantae
- Clade: Tracheophytes
- Clade: Angiosperms
- Clade: Eudicots
- Order: Proteales
- Family: Proteaceae
- Genus: Banksia
- Species: B. sphaerocarpa

Binomial name
- Banksia sphaerocarpa R.Br.

Varieties
- B. sphaerocarpa var. caesia; B. sphaerocarpa var. dolichostyla; B. sphaerocarpa var. latifolia; B. sphaerocarpa var. pumilio; B. sphaerocarpa var. sphaerocarpa

= Banksia sphaerocarpa =

Fox banksia

Species of plant native to Australia

Banksia sphaerocarpa, commonly known as the fox banksia or round-fruit banksia, is a species of shrub or tree in the plant genus Banksia (family Proteaceae). It is generally encountered as a 1–2 m (3.3–6.6 ft) high shrub, and is usually smaller in the north of its range. This species has narrow green leaves, and brownish, orange or yellow round flower spikes which may be seen from January to July. It is widely distributed across the southwest of Western Australia, growing exclusively in sandy soils. It is usually the dominant plant in scrubland or low woodland. It is pollinated by, and is a food source for, birds, mammals, and insects.

First described in 1810 by botanist Robert Brown, B. sphaerocarpa has a complicated taxonomic history, and several taxa once classified as part of a broadly defined B. sphaerocarpa have since been named as species in their own right. At present, most authorities recognise five varieties; the largest variety, B. sphaerocarpa var. dolichostyla (ironcap banksia), is sometimes given species rank as B. dolichostyla. B. sphaerocarpa is classified as Not Threatened under the Wildlife Conservation Act of Western Australia, although two varieties have been placed on the Declared Rare and Priority Flora List—var. latifolia has been designated a Priority Two – Poorly Known taxon, and var. dolichostyla falls under Declared Rare Flora. None of the varieties are commonly seen in cultivation.

== Description ==
Banksia sphaerocarpa is a variable species that differs in plant size, flower size and leaf size across its range. The variability is marked enough that five varieties are recognised. This species is generally a shrub 0.4–2 m (1.3–6.6 ft) tall. Plants are smaller in northern parts of the range, and grow larger in the southeast, with var. dolichostyla and rarely var. caesia reaching 4 m (13 ft) in height. All varieties bear a lignotuber, a swollen starchy root crown from which the plant resprouts after bushfire. The new stems are finely hairy but become smooth with maturity. The leaves are stiff, narrow and linear, and measure 2.5–10 cm (1.0–3.9 in) in length, on a petiole 2–3 mm (0.08–0.12 in) long. Leaves of most varieties are 1–1.5 mm (0.04–0.06 in) in width, and have a pointed tip, but var. latifolia has wider leaves, 2–2.5 mm (0.08–0.10 in), and a blunter tip. The foliage is green, or a more pale blue-grey in the case of caesia and dolichostyla.

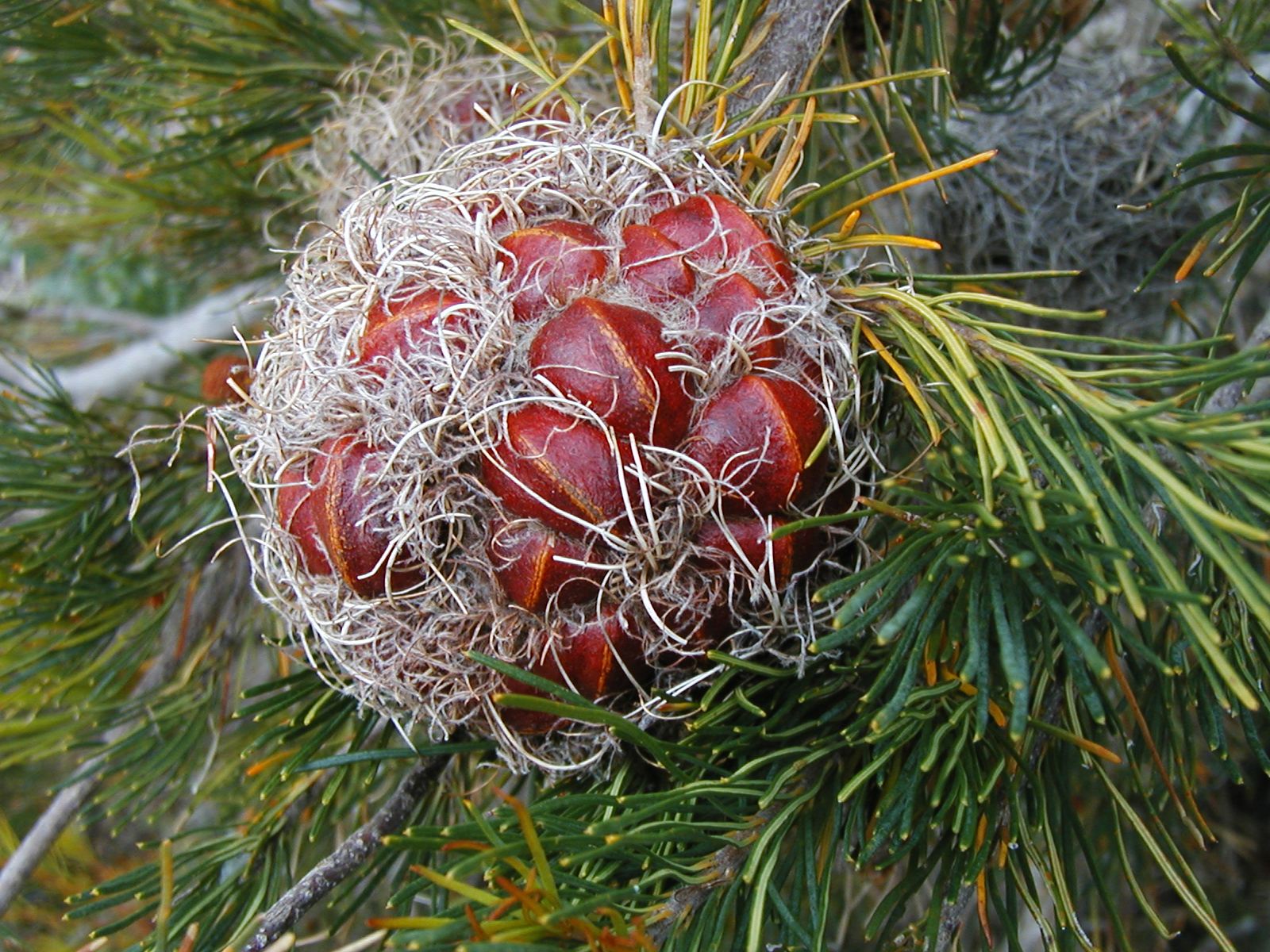
The roundness of the infructescences is the source of both the common and scientific names of B. sphaerocarpa.

The inflorescences are generally globular and measure 5 to 8 cm (2.0 to 3.1 in) in diameter, although larger forms, such as var. dolichostyla, are more oval in shape. Flowering from January to July, the blooms are yellow, orange or brownish in colour. They take five to eight weeks to develop from bud to the finish of flowering. Anthesis takes place over two weeks, as the individual flowers open in a wave across the inflorescence. Three weeks before the flowers open, the spikes develop a strong musky smell. The flowers produce unusually large quantities of nectar; indeed some flowers produce so much that it drips to the ground. The old flowers fade to brownish and grey hues and remain curled around the flower spike. Up to 60 follicles develop on the globular spikes. The follicles are finely furred at first before becoming smooth and golden brown in colour, measuring 1.5–3 cm (0.6–1.2 in) long, 0.5–0.8 cm (0.2–0.3 in) high, and 1–2.5 cm (0.4–1.0 in) wide. The follicles are flat with pronounced 'shoulders', giving a rectangular appearance in cross section. Specimens of var. sphaerocarpa in the Whicher Range, Jarrah Forest and the vicinity of Nannup have larger follicles. The seeds are wedge-shaped (cuneate), and measure 2.0–2.6 cm (0.8–1.0 in) in length, containing a smaller cuneate seed body measuring 1–1.4 cm (0.4–0.6 in) long by 0.5–1.3 cm (0.2–0.5 in) wide.

Northern specimens can be quite small shrubs and may be hard to distinguish from B. micrantha, which has smaller inflorescences and large flattened follicles.

== Taxonomy ==
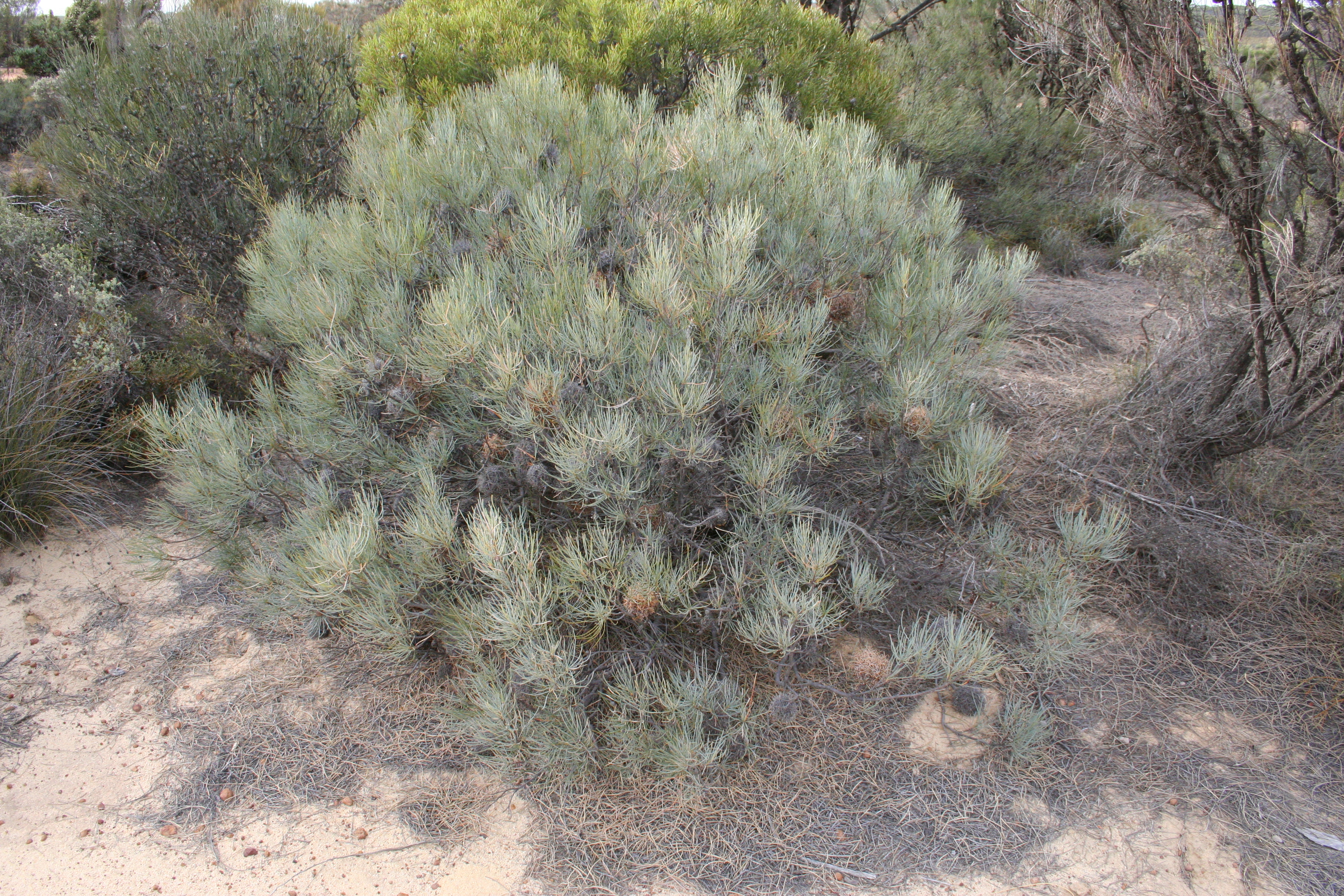
var. caesia, North Karlgarin Nature Reserve, highlighting fine bluish-grey foliage

The earliest known botanical collection of B. sphaerocarpa occurred in December 1801, during the visit of HMS Investigator to King George Sound. The specimen was collected from "A single plant observed between Princess Royal Harbour & Oyster Harbour on a heath", and is credited to English botanist Robert Brown, though it is not possible to be certain on this point, as Brown incorporated the collections of junior expedition members into his herbarium without attribution. Neither Brown nor expedition horticulturist Peter Good mentions the collection in his diary.

Brown published a formal description and name for the species in his 1810 On the Proteaceae of Jussieu. He did not designate a type specimen (a specimen to be representative of the species) for the species, but the one specimen in his collection has since been formally declared the lectotype for the species. He also did not state the etymology of the specific epithet, but it is accepted that the name derives from the Ancient Greek sphaera- ("round"), and carpos ("fruit"), in reference to the shape of its infructescences.

In Brown's arrangement of the genus, B. sphaerocarpa was placed between B. pulchella and B. nutans in taxonomic sequence; that is, an order that places related taxa next to each other. No subdivision of the genus was given, other than to separate a single distinctive species into a subgenus of its own. Swiss botanist Carl Meissner published a more detailed arrangement in 1856, placing B. sphaerocarpa in section Eubanksia because its inflorescence is a spike rather than a domed head, and in series Abietinae, whose members have inrolled leaf margins with no, or only very fine, serrations. Meissner also published a variety, B. sphaerocarpa var. glabrescens, based on specimens collected by James Drummond; this is now considered a synonym of B. incana.

George Bentham's revision of Banksia for his 1870 Flora Australiensis overturned Meissner's series; instead, B. sphaerocarpa was placed in a new section, Oncostylis, because of its hooked styles. Two varieties were recognised: Meissner's var. glabrescens was retained, and var. latifolia was newly described by Bentham. Bentham noted further variation amongst his specimens not accounted for by his varieties, stating "It is possible therefore that two species may be here confounded, but the specimens are insufficient for their distinction."

For many years following Bentham's arrangement, the circumscription of B. sphaerocarpa was widely recognised as unacceptably broad. William Blackall informally published two varieties, var. pinifolia and var. violacea (properly Banksia violacea) in his 1954 How to Know Western Australian Wildflowers; and in 1966 the nurseryman Fred Lullfitz predicted that there were as many as eight taxa within the species. Several of these were recognised in George's revision of the genus for 1981 "The genus Banksia L.f. (Proteaceae)": B. micrantha, B. grossa, B. lanata, B. scabrella, B. telmatiaea, B. leptophylla (Note: Banksia leptophylla had been classified informally as B. sphaerocarpa var. pinifolia or var. major until 1981. When it was promoted to species rank, the binomial combination Banksia pinifolia could not be used because it has already been published for Hakea gibbosa.) and B. incana. George placed B. sphaerocarpa in subgenus Banksia because of its flower spike, section Oncostylis because its styles are hooked, and the resurrected series Abietinae, which he constrained to contain only round-fruited species. He reduced variety latifolia to synonymy with variety sphaerocarpa, but conceded the species needed further review. Alex George reported that he thought Banksia sphaerocarpa's closest relatives to be Banksia micrantha and B. grossa.

George's arrangement remained current until 1996, when Kevin Thiele and Pauline Ladiges published an arrangement informed by a cladistic analysis of morphological characteristics. They retained George's subgenera and many of his series, but discarded his sections. Banksia ser. Abietinae was found to be very nearly monophyletic, and so retained. It further resolved into four subclades, so Thiele and Ladiges split it into four subseries. Banksia sphaerocarpa appeared in the second of these, initially called the 'grossa clade' for its most basal member. As with George's classification, B. grossa and B. micrantha emerged as close relatives of B. sphaerocarpa.

- B. grossa
- - B. dolichostyla
  - - B. micrantha
    - - B. sphaerocarpa var. caesia
      - B. sphaerocarpa var. sphaerocarpa

This clade became the basis for new subseries Sphaerocarpae, which Thiele defined as containing those species with lignotubers, styles loosely curling around the infructescence (although this trait was reversed in micrantha), and "transversely aligned cells of the seed wing inner face". Other than the most basal B. grossa, these species also have shouldered follicles. Having found B. micrantha to be more closely related than B. sphaerocarpa var. dolichostyla to the other varieties of B. sphaerocarpa, they promoted var. dolichostyla to species rank as Banksia dolichostyla. Morphological support for this was given by the fact that the old styles of var. dolichostyla are quite different from those of other varieties, being stouter, and tending not to curl around the infructescence as the others do.

Questioning the emphasis on cladistics in Thiele and Ladiges' arrangement, George published a slightly modified version of his 1981 arrangement in his 1999 treatment of Banksia for the Flora of Australia series of monographs. He added that he did not feel the characters of dolichostyla alone justified specific rank, being essentially merely larger in all parts than, but otherwise essentially similar to, var. caesia. Therefore, he retained it as a variety of B. sphaerocarpa. To date, George's 1999 arrangement remains the most recent comprehensive classification. The placement of B. sphaerocarpa in George's 1999 arrangement may be summarised as follows:

Banksia

B. subg. Banksia

B. sect. Banksia (9 series, 50 species, 9 subspecies, 3 varieties)
B. sect. Coccinea (1 species)
B. sect. Oncostylis

B. ser. Spicigerae (7 species, 2 subspecies, 4 varieties)
B. ser. Tricuspidae (1 species)
B. ser. Dryandroideae (1 species)
B. ser. Abietinae

B. sphaerocarpa

B. sphaerocarpa var. caesia
B. sphaerocarpa var. dolichostyla
B. sphaerocarpa var. latifolia
B. sphaerocarpa var. pumilio
B. sphaerocarpa var. sphaerocarpa

B. micrantha
B. grossa
B. telmatiaea
B. leptophylla (2 varieties)
B. lanata
B. scabrella
B. violacea
B. incana
B. laricina
B. pulchella
B. meisneri (2 subspecies)
B. nutans (2 varieties)

B. subg. Isostylis (3 species)

A 2002 study by American botanists Austin Mast and Tom Givnish yielded a surprise when molecular analysis mapped out dolichostyla as a sister taxon to its geographical neighbour B. violacea, in a clade with B. laricina and B. incana. B. micrantha and the other two varieties of B. sphaerocarpa form a separate clade nearby.

Early in 2007, Mast and Thiele initiated a rearrangement of Banksia by merging Dryandra into it, and publishing B. subg. Spathulatae for the taxa having spoon-shaped cotyledons. They foreshadowed publishing a full arrangement once DNA sampling of Dryandra was complete; in the meantime, if Mast and Thiele's nomenclatural changes are taken as an interim arrangement, then B. sphaerocarpa is placed in B. subg. Spathulatae.

In 2008, George reinstated B. sphaerocarpa var. latifolia, and published the new variety B. sphaerocarpa var. pumilio.

=== Varieties ===
Banksia sphaerocarpa is a widely distributed Western Australian species with four (or five if one includes var. dolichostyla) varieties:

- B. sphaerocarpa var. caesia, first described by Alex George in his 1981 revision of the genus, grows larger than most other varieties, reaching 2 m (6.6 ft), or occasionally 4 m (13 ft), in height. It has yellow blooms and bluish grey foliage and is found in the central and southern Wheatbelt between the towns of Piawaning, Kojonup, Newdegate and Corrigin.
- B. sphaerocarpa var. dolichostyla (Ironcap Banksia) was first described by Alex George in his 1981 revision of the genus. It is the largest of the varieties, encountered as a large shrub or small tree to 4 m (13 ft) high. It is larger in all parts than the other varieties, and has been considered a separate species. It is restricted to a small area from South Ironcap, east of Hyden, south to Mt Holland in the eastern Wheatbelt.
- B. sphaerocarpa var. latifolia was originally described in a manuscript by Mueller and published by Bentham in 1870. It grows as a small rounded shrub to 50 cm (1.6 ft) in height, and is restricted to the vicinity of the south coast between Denmark and the Porongorup Range, where it is found in low, open forest of Eucalyptus marginata and E. calophylla.
- B. sphaerocarpa var. pumilio, first described by Alex George in 2008, is a small shrub less than a metre high. It is found from Tathra National Park east of Eneabba south to the Chittering valley. Its subspecific name is derived from the Latin pumilio "small", relating to the flowers.
- B. sphaerocarpa var. sphaerocarpa is widely distributed from the Darling Plateau east of Perth to the Whicher Range in the southwest, and southeast to the Stirling Range. Populations north of Perth once referable to it are now classified as var. pumilio.
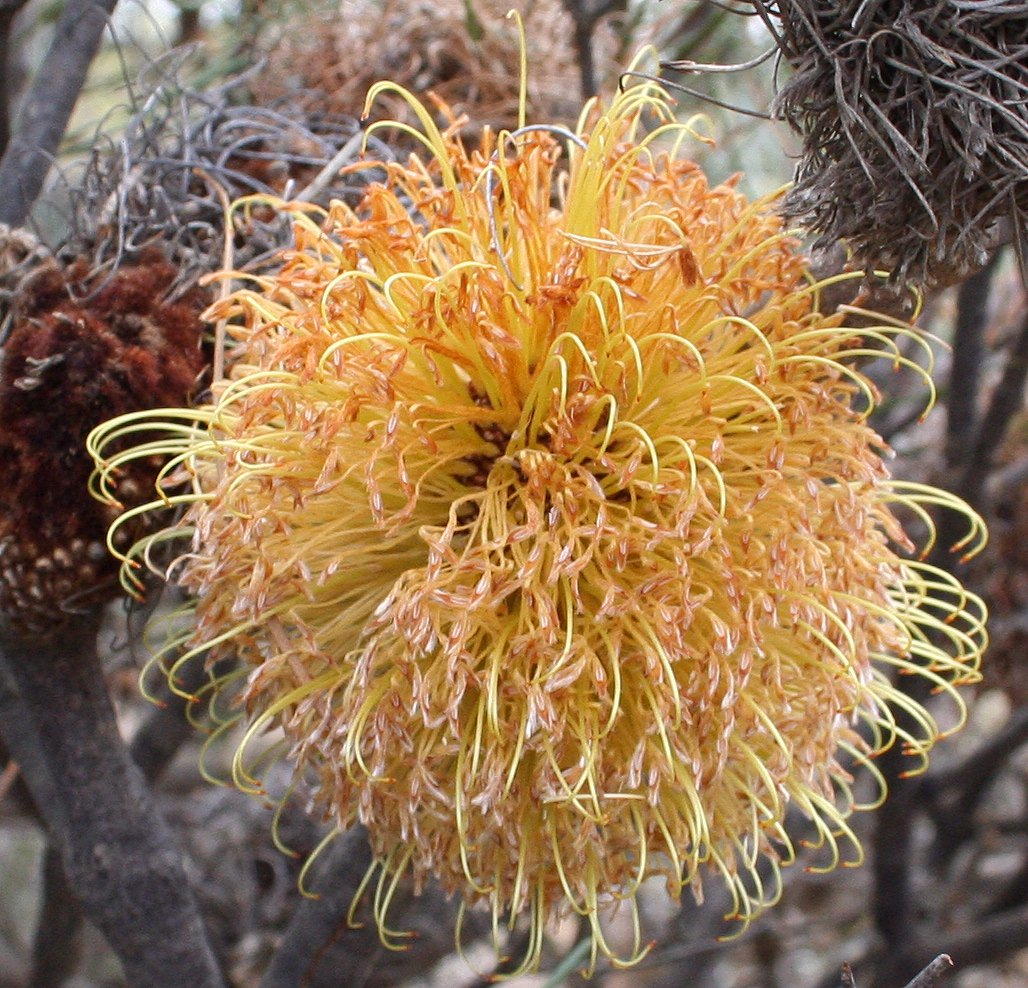
var. caesia
Bendering Reserve

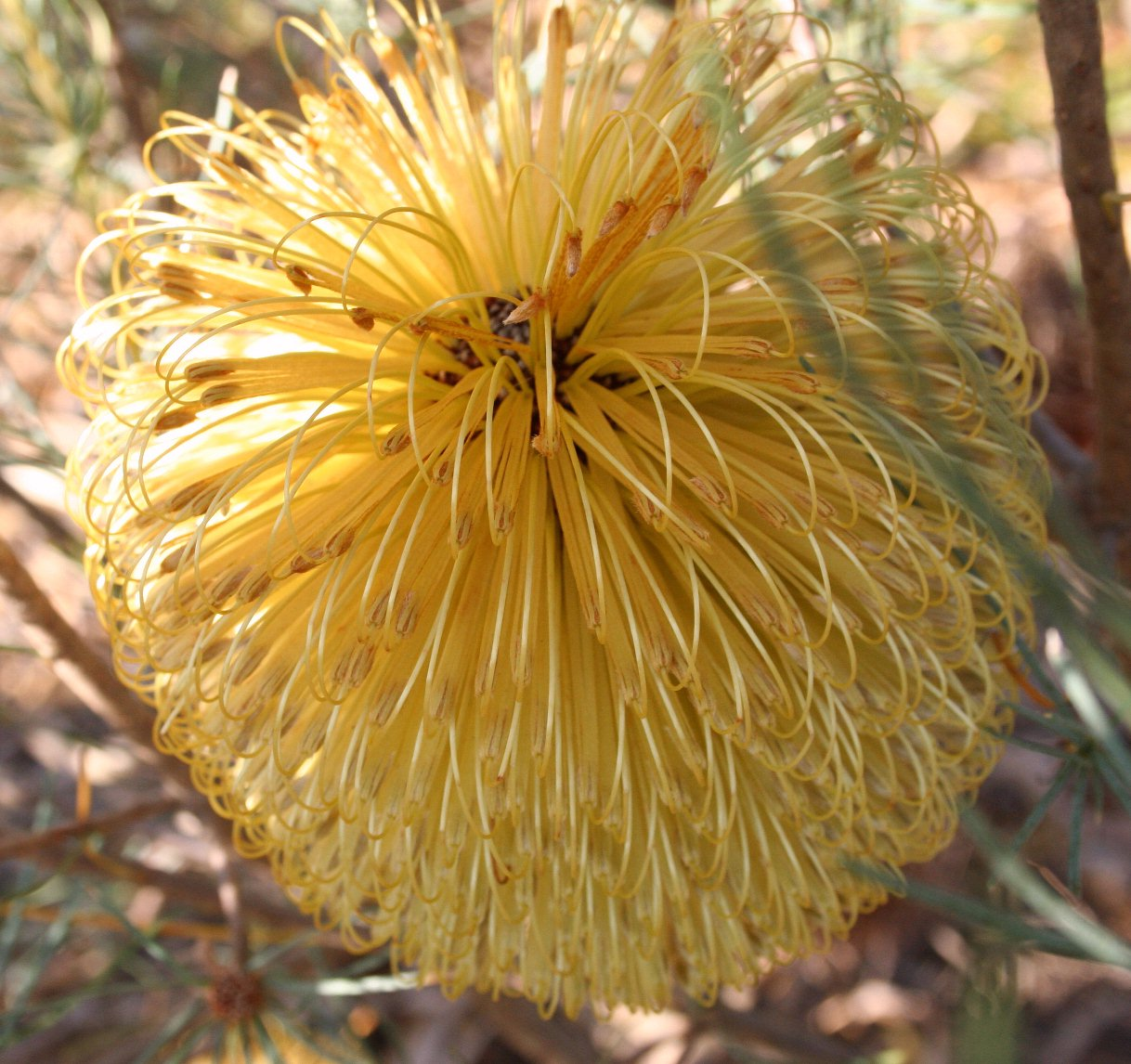
var. dolichostyla

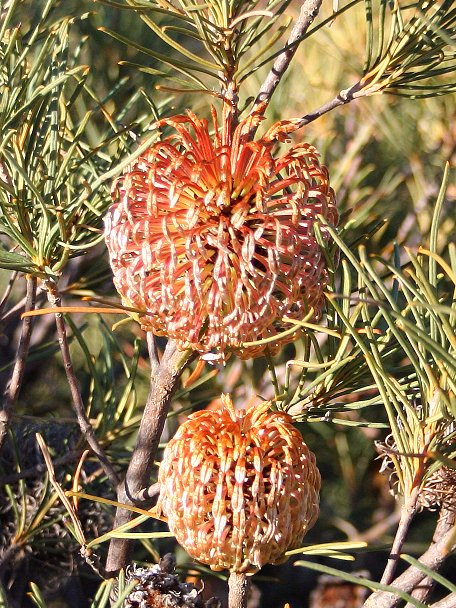
var. pumilio
in gravelpit near Cataby

== Distribution and habitat ==
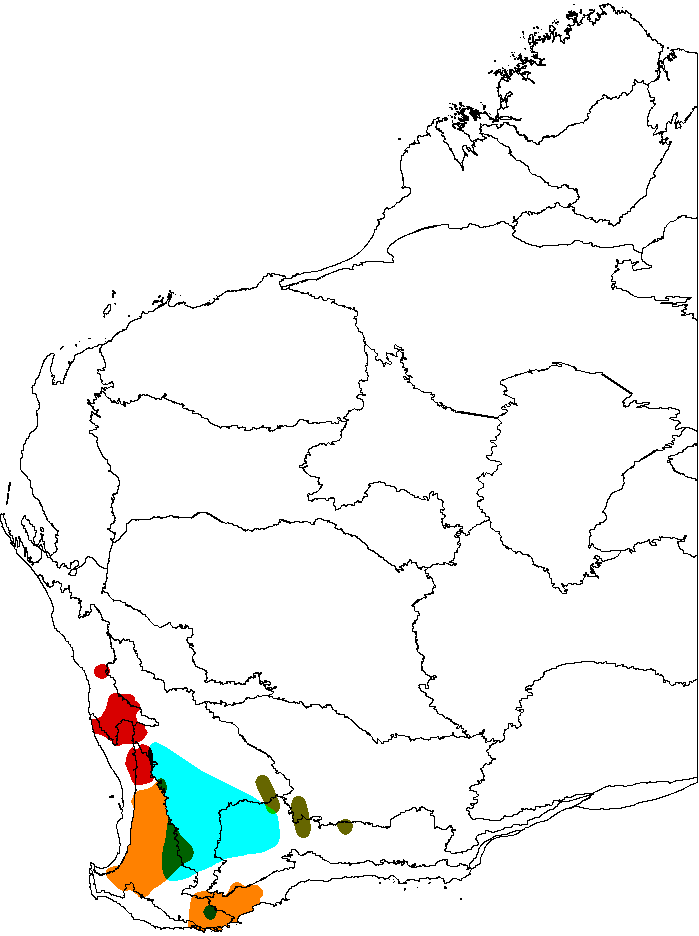
Distribution of B. sphaerocarpa in Western Australia, colour-coded by variety: var. sphaerocarpa, var. caesia, var. dolichostyla, var. pumilio, var. latifolia. Colour changes also indicate overlaps in distribution, where multiple varieties co-occur.

Banksia sphaerocarpa is distributed widely across southwestern Western Australia—from Eneabba in the north, south to the Whicher Range, Nannup, Albany and Jerramungup, and eastwards to the vicinity of Hyden. It is mainly found on sandy soils in flat or gently sloped areas in shrubland, mallee or open woodland.

== Conservation ==
As a species, B. sphaerocarpa is not considered to be under threat, but two of the five varieties have been placed on the Declared Rare and Priority Flora List. B sphaerocarpa var. dolichostyla has been gazetted as "Declared Rare Flora – Extant" under the Wildlife Conservation Act 1950. Banksia sphaerocarpa var. latifolia, though not afforded legislative protection, has been identified as a "Priority Two – Poorly Known" taxon, because so few populations are known.

== Ecology ==
Various animals, including mammals, birds, and insects such as bees, wasps, ants and beetles, have been recorded visiting Banksia sphaerocarpa inflorescences, including the colletid bee species Hylaeus sanguinipictus. Botanist Stephen Hopper found pollen of B. sphaerocarpa on New Holland honeyeaters (Phylidonyris novaehollandiae) and honey possums (Tarsipes rostratus) at Cheyne Beach in a field study published in 1980.

Knowledge of the breeding system of B. sphaerocarpa comes from a 2009 study of genetic structure within and across fragmented plant populations, which made a case study of B. sphaerocarpa var. caesia populations in the vicinity of Dongolocking, where the landscape has been severely fragmented by land clearing. Very little self-pollination was observed. Most mating was between plants in the same population, but inter-population mating accounted for 15–33% of seed, a "very significant contribution... to overall reproductive dynamics". This figure was lowest in the smallest populations, which also exhibited lower rates of germination, smaller plants, and less genetic diversity than larger populations. One possible interpretation of this is that interpopulation mating confers a fitness advantage. There was also evidence of fine-scale genetic structure, with plants tending to be more closely related to nearby plants than to more distant plants. The authors suggest that gene flow was probably always limited in these populations, even before they were fragmented.

Banksia sphaerocarpa is one of five closely related Banksia species that have highly unusual flower nectar. (Note: The other four species are Banksia grossa, B. incana, B. leptophylla and B. telmatiaea.) Whereas other Banksia species produce nectar that is clear and watery, the nectar of these species is pale yellow initially, but gradually becomes darker and thicker, changing to a thick, olive-green mucilage within one to two days of secretion, and eventually becoming "an almost black, gelatinous lump adhering to the base of the flowers". It was first noted by Byron Lamont in 1980; he attributed it to cyanobacteria that feed off the nectar sugars. Noting that many of these cyanobacteria had heterocysts, he speculated that they aid the plant by fixing atmospheric nitrogen, which is then washed off the flower heads by rain, and absorbed by the proteoid root mat. This purported symbiosis was investigated by Barrett and Lamont in 1985, but no evidence of nitrogen fixing was found. Further investigation by Markey and Lamont in 1996 suggested that the discolouration is not caused by cyanobacteria or other microorganisms in the nectar, but is rather "a chemical phenomenon of plant origin". Their analyses indicated that the nectar had unusually high levels of sugar and free amino acids, but three of these species, including B. sphaerocarpa, have since been shown to have normal nectar sugar compositions.

Like most Western Australian Banksia species, B. sphaerocarpa is susceptible to dieback from the soil-borne water mould Phytophthora cinnamomi. In one experiment, 43% of plants were dead within three months of inoculation, and the species was therefore rated as "moderately susceptible". In another experiment, 37% of plants were dead within three months, and 85% within a year; yet this study rated the species' susceptibility as "high". In the latter study, it took 35 to 40 days for the death rate to reach its maximum, and thereafter the death rate continued at that level throughout the year, only dipping slightly in the dry summer months.

== Cultivation ==
None of the varieties of Banksia sphaerocarpa are commonly seen in cultivation. They are difficult to grow in the wetter conditions of Australia's east coast. Trials with grafting have been very limited and results have been poor. Otherwise, they adapt well to gardens with good drainage, sandy soils and sunny aspects in drier and Mediterranean (winter moisture) climates, and are also frost tolerant. They are good bird-attracting plants, and flower when not much else is in flower. Seeds do not require any treatment prior to sowing, and take 20 to 48 days to germinate.
