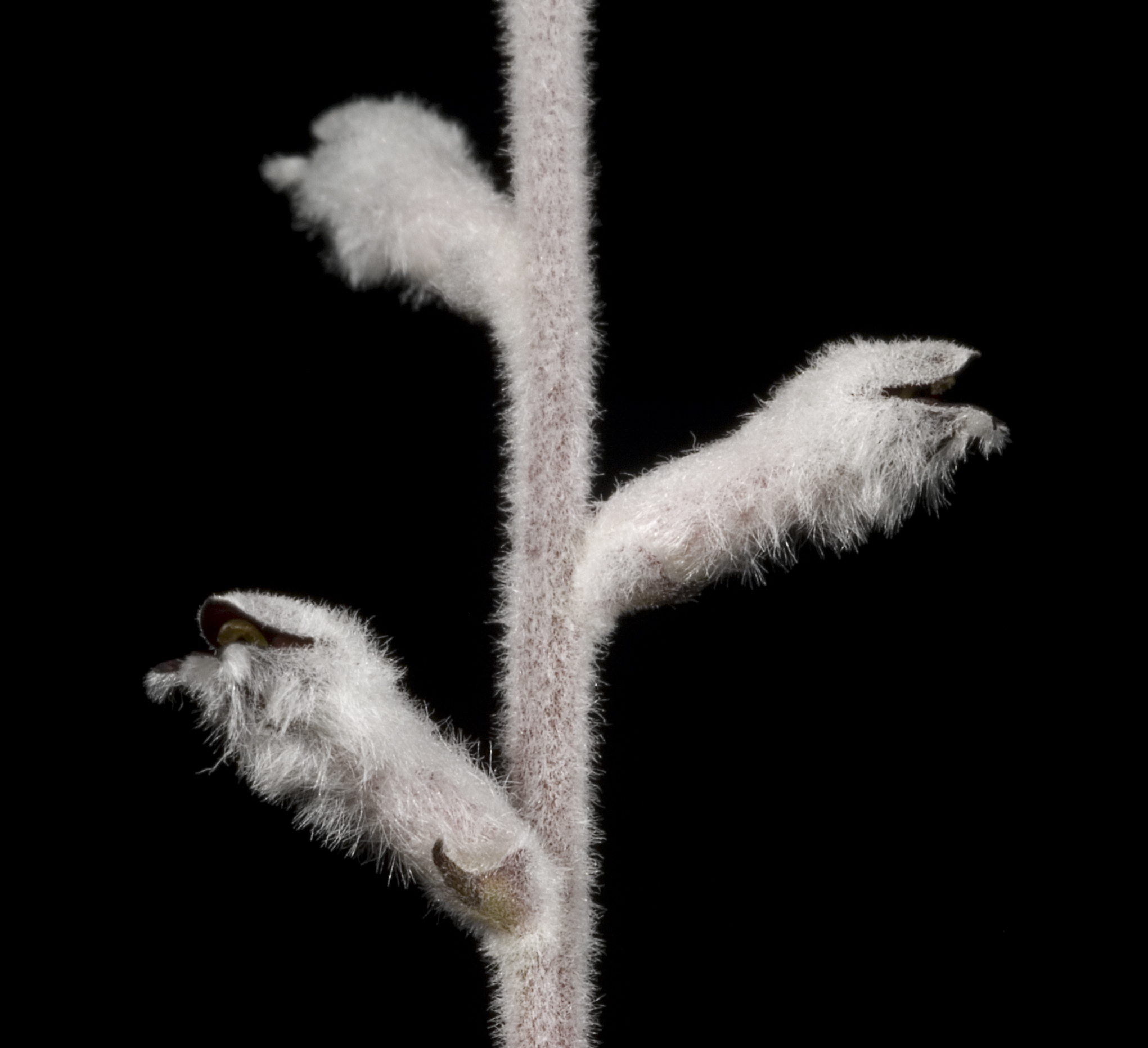

Conservation status
- Vulnerable (EPBC Act)

Scientific classification
- Kingdom: Plantae
- Clade: Tracheophytes
- Clade: Angiosperms
- Clade: Eudicots
- Order: Proteales
- Family: Proteaceae
- Genus: Conospermum
- Species: C. undulatum

Binomial name
- Conospermum undulatum Lindl.

Synonyms
- Conospermum triplinervium var. undulatum Blackall & Grieve

= Conospermum undulatum =

Species of Australian shrub

Conospermum undulatum, commonly known as wavy-leaved smokebush, is a species of flowering plant in the family Proteaceae and is endemic a small area east of Perth in the south-west of Western Australia. It is an erect, compact shrub with wavy lance-shaped leaves, the narrower end towards the base, or spoon-shaped leaves, spike-like panicles of woolly, white, tube-shaped flowers and hairy nuts.

== Description ==
Conospermum undulatum is an erect, compact shrub that typically grows to a height of 0.6–2 m (2 ft 0 in – 6 ft 7 in). Its leaves are lance-shaped with the narrower end towards the base, to spoon-shaped, 14–120 mm (0.55–4.72 in) long, 4–38 mm (0.16–1.50 in) wide and grabrous, with wavy edges. The flowers are borne in spike-like panicles on a peduncle 255–400 mm (10.0–15.7 in) long with egg-shaped, densely hairy bracteoles 2.0–3.1 mm (0.079–0.122 in) long and 2–3 mm (0.079–0.118 in) wide. The flowers are white and woolly, forming a tube 2.8–4.5 mm (0.11–0.18 in) long, the upper lip 1.8–2.4 mm (0.071–0.094 in) long and 1.0–1.2 mm (0.039–0.047 in) wide, the lower lip with narrowly oblong lobes 0.5–1 mm (0.020–0.039 in) long and 0.2–0.3 mm (0.0079–0.0118 in) wide. Flowering occurs from June to October, and the fruit is a nut about 2.5 mm (0.098 in) long and 3 mm (0.12 in) wide with dark tan, velvety hairs.

== Taxonomy ==
Conospermum undulaum was first formally described in 1839 by John Lindley in his A Sketch of the Vegetation of the Swan River Colony. The specific epithet (undulatum) means 'wavy' referring to the leaves.

== Distribution and habitat ==
Wavy-leaved smokebush grows on sand and sandy clay on flat or sloping sites between the Swan and Canning Rivers on the Darling Scarp to the east of Perth, mostly in jarrah or marri woodland, in the Jarrah Forest and Swan Coastal Plain bioregions of south-western Western Australia.

== Conservation status ==
Conospermum undulatum is listed as vulnerable under the EPBC Act, and as "Threatened Flora (Declared Rare Flora — Extant)" by the Government of Western Australia Department of Biodiversity, Conservation and Attractions.
