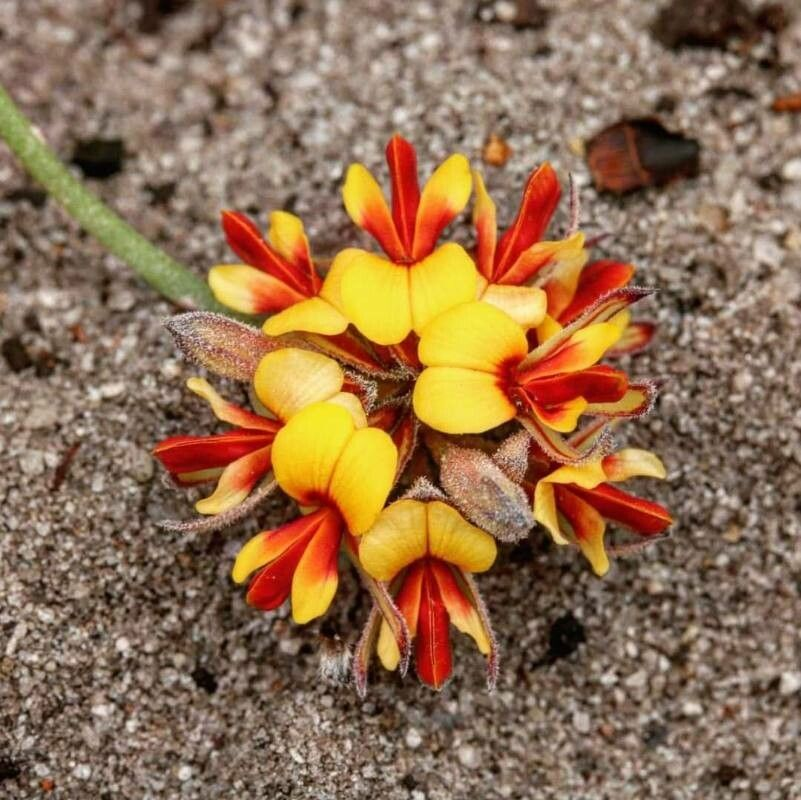

Scientific classification
- Kingdom: Plantae
- Clade: Tracheophytes
- Clade: Angiosperms
- Clade: Eudicots
- Clade: Rosids
- Order: Fabales
- Family: Fabaceae
- Subfamily: Faboideae
- Genus: Jacksonia
- Species: J. capitata

Binomial name
- Jacksonia capitata Benth.

Synonyms
- Jacksonia capitata Benth. var. capitata; Jacksonia juncea Turcz.; Jacksonia umbellata Turcz.; Piptomeris umbellata (Turcz.) Greene; Jacksonia lehmanni var. angulata Blackall & Grieve nom. inval., nom. nud.; Jacksonia pteroclada F.Muell.; Piptomeris angulata (Benth.) Greene; Piptomeris pteroclada (F.Muell.) Greene

= Jacksonia capitata =

Species of legume

Jacksonia capitata is a species of flowering plant in the family Fabaceae and is endemic to the south of Western Australia. It is a spindly, low-lying to erect ascending shrub with curly, greyish green, cylindrical branches, the leaves reduced scales, and yellow-orange and red flowers in clusters at the ends of the shoots.

== Description ==
Jacksonia capitata is a spindly, low-lying to erect ascending shrub that typically grows up to 5–50 cm (2.0–19.7 in) high and 30–50 cm (12–20 in) wide. It has greyish-green, branches 6–20 mm (0.24–0.79 in) long and .4–0.7 mm (0.016–0.028 in), its leaves reduced to egg-shaped scales, 0.5–1.3 mm (0.020–0.051 in) long and 0.3–0.8 mm (0.012–0.031 in) wide. The flowers are arranged in umbel-like clusters on the ends of shoots, each flower on a pedicel 1.5–3.5 mm (0.059–0.138 in) long, with egg-shaped or narrowly egg-shaped bracteoles 0.5–1.5 mm (0.020–0.059 in) long and 0.3–0.6 mm (0.012–0.024 in) wide with toothed edges. The floral tube is 0.5–0.8 mm (0.020–0.031 in) long and the sepals are membraneous, with lobes 4.5–7 mm (0.18–0.28 in) long and 0.65–1.5 mm (0.026–0.059 in) wide. The standard petal is yellow-orange with a red "eye", 4.0–4.5 mm (0.16–0.18 in) long and 4.3–6 mm (0.17–0.24 in) wide, the wings yellow-orange with dark red markings, 3.3–3.9 mm (0.13–0.15 in) long, and the keel is red, 5–6 mm (0.20–0.24 in) long. The stamens have pink filaments with a red tip and are 3–6.1 mm (0.12–0.24 in) long. Flowering occurs from September to January, and the fruit is a membraneous pod 4.4–5 mm (0.17–0.20 in) long and 2.7–3.0 mm (0.11–0.12 in) wide.

== Taxonomy ==
Jacksonia capitata was first formally described in 1837 by George Bentham in his Commentationes de Leguminosarum Generibus from specimens collected by Ferdinand Bauer. The specific epithet (capitata) means 'capitate', referring to the head of flowers.

== Distribution and habitat ==
This species of Jacksonia grows in sandy soils on headlands or plains between the Stirling Range and Israelite Bay, with an isolated population in the Lane Poole Reserve, in the Avon Wheatbelt, Esperance Plains, Jarrah Forest and Mallee bioregions of southern Western Australia.

== Conservation status ==
This species is listed as "not threatened" by the Government of Western Australia Department of Biodiversity, Conservation and Attractions.
