= Acacia lullfitziorum =

Scientific classification
- Kingdom: Plantae
- Clade: Tracheophytes
- Clade: Angiosperms
- Clade: Eudicots
- Clade: Rosids
- Order: Fabales
- Family: Fabaceae
- Subfamily: Caesalpinioideae
- Clade: Mimosoid clade
- Genus: Acacia
- Species: A. lullfitziorum

Binomial name
- Acacia lullfitziorum Maslin
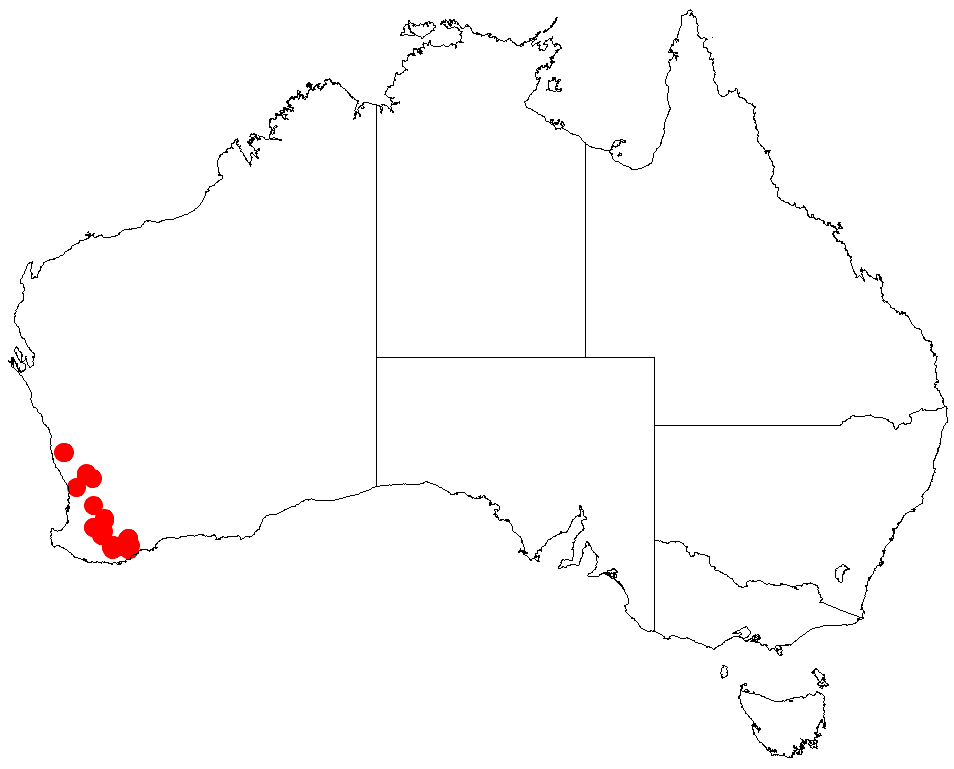
- Occurrence data from AVH

Species of legume

Acacia lullfitziorum is a species of flowering plant in the family Fabaceae and is endemic to the southwest of Western Australia. It is a rigid, spreading to sprawling shrub with oblong to elliptic or egg-shaped phyllodes, spherical to shortly oblong heads of golden yellow flowers, and curved, thinly leathery pods.

== Description ==
Acacia lullfitziorum is a spreading to sprawling, spiny shrub that typically grows to 20–70 cm (7.9–27.6 in) high and often forms low domed mats 40–130 cm (16–51 in) wide. Its branches are glabrous or with short, more or less hooked widely-spreading spiny branchlets. The phyllodes are oblong to elliptic or egg-shaped with the narrower end towards the base, 5–10 mm (0.20–0.39 in) long, 2–4 mm (0.079–0.157 in) wide and thin, often with a small point on the end. The phyllodes are sometimes in bundles of two to five and there are thin, membranous stipules at their base. The flowers are borne in one or two spherical to shortly oblong head in axils on peduncles 5–10 mm (0.20–0.39 in) long. The heads are 3–4.5 mm (0.12–0.18 in) in diameter with 15 to 20 golden yellow flowers. Flowering occurs from August to October, and the pods are curved, more or less terete, up to 30 mm (1.2 in) long, 2.0–2.5 mm (0.079–0.098 in) wide, glabrous and thinly leathery. The seeds are more or less oblong, 2.5–3.0 mm (0.098–0.118 in) long and shiny dark brown with a yellowish centre and a thick aril.

== Taxonomy ==
Acacia lullfitziorum was first formally described in 1999 by Bruce Maslin in the journal Nuytsia from specimens collected by Maslin near the Arthur River crossing on the Narrogin–Katanning road. The specific epithet (lullfitziorum) honours Fred Lullfitz and his nephew George Lullfitz, "both of whom have been instrumental in popularising the cultivation of Western Australia's native flora".

== Distribution and habitat ==
This species of wattle grows in gravelly, sandy, clay or loamy soils in Eucalyptus wandoo woodland, mainly from the Arthur River and south to near Cranbrook and Ongerup, but with single collections from near Goomalling and Badgingarra, in the Avon Wheatbelt, Esperance Plains, Geraldton Sandplains, Jarrah Forest and Mallee bioregions of southwestern Western Australia.

== See also ==
- List of Acacia species
