= Acacia lanceolata =

Conservation status
- Priority Three — Poorly Known Taxa (DEC)

Scientific classification
- Kingdom: Plantae
- Clade: Embryophytes
- Clade: Tracheophytes
- Clade: Spermatophytes
- Clade: Angiosperms
- Clade: Eudicots
- Clade: Rosids
- Order: Fabales
- Family: Fabaceae
- Subfamily: Caesalpinioideae
- Clade: Mimosoid clade
- Genus: Acacia
- Species: A. lanceolata

Binomial name
- Acacia lanceolata Maslin
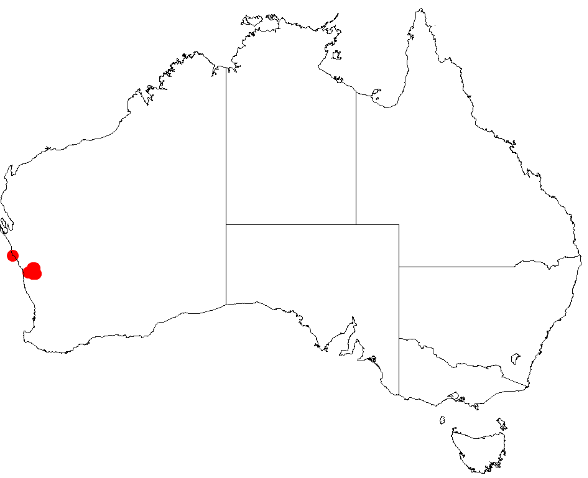
- Acacia lanceolata occurrence data from Australasian Virtual Herbarium

Synonyms
- Racosperma lanceolatum (Maslin) Pedley

Species of legume

Acacia lanceolata is a species of flowering plant in the family Fabaceae and is endemic to a small area in the south-west of Western Australia. It is a shrub with many branches, sharply pointed, glabrous lance-shaped to narrowly elliptic phyllodes, spherical heads of golden yellow flowers, and tightly coiled, firmly papery, glabrous pods appearing more or less like a string of beads.

== Description ==
Acacia lanceolata is on open shrub with many branches, that typically grows to a height of 0.3–1.2 m (1 ft 0 in – 3 ft 11 in) and has somewhat spiny, hairy branchlets that are covered with a powdery bloom near the ends. Its phyllodes are lance-shaped, 7–15 mm (0.28–0.59 in) long and 1.5–4 mm (0.059–0.157 in) wide, sometimes narrowly elliptic, sharply pointed with a central midrib and two or three minor veins and a gland 4–7 mm (0.16–0.28 in) above the pulvinus. The flowers are borne in a spherical or oblong head in axils on a peduncle 3–8 mm (0.12–0.31 in) long, the heads with 20 to 23 golden yellow flowers. Flowering has been recorded in August and September, and the pods are rather tightly coiled, up to 17 mm (0.67 in) long, 10 mm (0.39 in) wide and firmly papery and glabrous. The seeds are oblong, about 4 mm (0.16 in) long with an aril about 2/3 the length of the seed.

== Taxonomy ==
Acacia lanceolata was first formally described in 1999 by Bruce Maslin in the journal Nuytsia from specimens collected near Three Springs by William Edward Blackall in 1940. The specific epithet (lanceolata) means 'wikt:lanceolate'.

== Distribution and habitat ==
This species of wattle grows on low rocky or lateritic hills in woodland or tall shrubland in a small area in the Mingenew-Three Springs area in the Avon Wheatbelt and Geraldton Sandplains bioregions of south-western Western Australia.

== Conservation status ==
Acacia lanceolata is listed as "Priority Three" by the Government of Western Australia Department of Parks and Wildlife, meaning that it is poorly known and known from only a few locations but is not under imminent threat.

== See also ==
- List of Acacia species
