= Grevillea lullfitzii =

Conservation status
- Critically Endangered (IUCN 3.1)

- Priority One — Poorly Known Taxa (DEC)

Scientific classification
- Kingdom: Plantae
- Clade: Embryophytes
- Clade: Tracheophytes
- Clade: Angiosperms
- Clade: Eudicots
- Order: Proteales
- Family: Proteaceae
- Genus: Grevillea
- Species: G. lullfitzii

Binomial name
- Grevillea lullfitzii McGill.

Species of shrub endemic to Western Australia

Grevillea lullfitzii is a species of flowering plant in the family Proteaceae and is endemic to a relatively small area of inland Western Australia. It is a spreading shrub with deeply divided leaves, the lobes linear and sharply-pointed, and clusters of greyish-white and cream flowers with an off-white style.

== Description ==
Grevillea lullfitzii is a spreading shrub that typically grows to a height of up to 1.5 m (4 ft 11 in). Its leaves are 30–50 mm (1.2–2.0 in) long and deeply divided with three to six sharply-pointed lobes 15–35 mm (0.59–1.38 in) long and 1.2–1.5 mm (0.047–0.059 in) wide, the edges rolled under almost to the midvein. The flowers are arranged in erect clusters on a silky-hairy rachis 2–3 mm (0.079–0.118 in) long. The flowers are greyish-white and cream-coloured with an off-white style that turns pinkish-brown as it ages, the pistil 8.0–10.5 mm (0.31–0.41 in) long. Flowering has been recorded in December and the fruit is an elliptic to oval follicle 14–17 mm (0.55–0.67 in) long.

== Taxonomy ==
Grevillea lullfitzii was first formally described in 1986 by Donald McGillivray in his book, New Names in Grevillea (Proteaceae) from specimens collected in 1964. The specific epithet, (lullfitzii) honours Fred Lullfitz, who collected the type specimen.

== Distribution and habitat ==
This grevillea grows in woodland on granite hills near Lake King in the Mallee bioregion of inland Western Australia.

== Conservation status ==
Grevillea lullfitzii is listed as priority one by the Government of Western Australia Department of Biodiversity, Conservation and Attractions', meaning that it is known from only one or a few locations which are potentially at risk, and as critically endangered under the IUCN Red List.

== See also ==
- List of Grevillea species
