= The Western Australian Flora: A Descriptive Catalogue =

2000 Australian plant species catalog

The Western Australian Flora: A Descriptive Catalogue was published by the Wildflower Society of Western Australia, the Western Australian Herbarium, CALM, and the Botanic Gardens and Parks Authority of Perth, Western Australia.

== Publication ==
At the time of publication in 2000 the number of published vascular plant species recognised had reached 9640 - almost double since the work of Beard in 1969.

The publication of the book was an important stage of the cataloguing of details of flora in Western Australia.

The introduction of the book by Alex R. Chapman is available as a PDF file, at the external link at FloraBase.

== Floristic regions ==
The front inside cover has an important distinctive map of Western Australian Biogeographic Regions and Botanical Provinces, after Creswell and Thackray 1995 - the authors of the IBRA system.

After Beard's summary of Diels, Burbidge and Gardner in 1980 he established the three phytogeographic provinces - Northern, Eremaean, and South West, and the map links in the relationship of these with the IBRA regions and sub regions.

== Publication details ==
- Paczkowska, Grazyna and Alex R. Chapman (2000). The Western Australian Flora : a descriptive catalogue Perth, W.A: Wildflower Society of Western Australia : Western Australian Herbarium: Western Australian Botanic Gardens & Parks Authority ISBN 0-646-40100-9 (pbk.)

== See also ==
- How to Know Western Australian Wildflowers
- Vegetation Survey of Western Australia
