= Goodenia glareicola =

Scientific classification
- Kingdom: Plantae
- Clade: Tracheophytes
- Clade: Angiosperms
- Clade: Eudicots
- Clade: Asterids
- Order: Asterales
- Family: Goodeniaceae
- Genus: Goodenia
- Species: G. glareicola

Binomial name
- Goodenia glareicola Carolin

Species of plant

Goodenia glareicola is a species of flowering plant in the family Goodeniaceae and is endemic to the south-west of Western Australia. It is an erect, perennial herb with linear to lance-shaped leaves, and racemes of blue flowers with purplish spots.

== Description ==
Goodenia glareicola is an erect, glabrous or glaucous perennial herb that typically grows to a height of 30 cm (12 in). The leaves at the base of the plant are linear to lance-shaped with the narrower end towards the base, 20–30 mm (0.79–1.18 in) long and 2–4 mm (0.079–0.157 in) wide, those on the stems smaller. The flowers are arranged in racemes up to 200 mm (7.9 in) long on a peduncle 8–20 mm (0.31–0.79 in) long with leaf-like bracts 1–2 mm (0.039–0.079 in) long at the base. Each flower is on a pedicel usually 5–10 mm (0.20–0.39 in) long with linear to lance-shaped bracteoles 2.5–3 mm (0.098–0.118 in) long. The sepals are lance-shaped, 3–4 mm (0.12–0.16 in) long, the corolla blue, about 15 mm (0.59 in) long. The lower lobes of the corolla are 6–7 mm (0.24–0.28 in) long with wings 2–2.5 mm (0.079–0.098 in) wide. Flowering occurs from October to January and the fruit is an oval capsule 8–9 mm (0.31–0.35 in) long.

== Taxonomy and naming ==
Goodenia glareicola was first formally described in 1990 by Roger Charles Carolin in the journal Telopea from material collected in 1931 by William Blackall near Newdegate. The specific epithet (glareicola) means "gravel-inhabiting".

== Distribution and habitat ==
This goodenia grows in gravelly and sandy soil from Mullewa to Lake Grace in the south-west of Western Australia.

== Conservation status ==
Goodenia glareicola is classified as "not threatened" by the Government of Western Australia Department of Parks and Wildlife.
