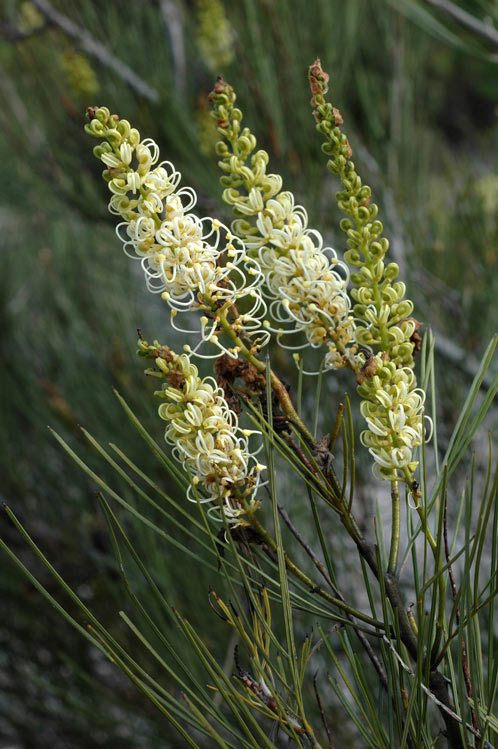
- In Kings Park, Perth

Conservation status
- Priority Three — Poorly Known Taxa (DEC)

- Vulnerable (IUCN 3.1)

Scientific classification
- Kingdom: Plantae
- Clade: Embryophytes
- Clade: Tracheophytes
- Clade: Spermatophytes
- Clade: Angiosperms
- Clade: Eudicots
- Order: Proteales
- Family: Proteaceae
- Genus: Grevillea
- Species: G. candicans

Binomial name
- Grevillea candicans C.A.Gardner

= Grevillea candicans =

Species of plant endemic to Western Australia

Grevillea candicans is a species of flowering plant in the family Proteaceae and is endemic to the south-west of Western Australia. It is a bushy shrub with pinnately-divided leaves with sharply-pointed linear lobes, and cream-coloured flowers.

== Description ==
Grevillea candicans is a bushy shrub that typically grows to a height of 1–3 m (3 ft 3 in – 9 ft 10 in). Its leaves are pinnately divided, 80–240 mm (3.1–9.4 in) long, with two to seven erect, sharply pointed, linear lobes 40–180 mm (1.6–7.1 in) long and 0.7–1 mm (0.028–0.039 in) wide with the edges turned under. The lower surface of the leaves has two hairy grooves. The flowers are arranged in leaf axils and on the ends of branchlets in cylindrical groups 140–210 mm (5.5–8.3 in) long, and are cream-coloured, the pistil 27–30 mm (1.1–1.2 in) long and glabrous. Flowering mostly occurs from August to November and the fruit is a glabrous follicle 22–26 mm (0.87–1.02 in) long.

== Taxonomy ==
Grevillea candicans was first formally described in 1942 by Charles Gardner in the Journal of the Royal Society of Western Australia from specimens collected by William Blackall. The specific epithet (candicans) means "becoming white or whitish".

== Distribution and habitat ==
This grevillea grows in sandy soil in open shrubland or woodland from near Geraldton to the Murchison River with an isolated population east of Dalwallinu, in the Avon Wheatbelt, Geraldton Sandplains and Yalgoo biogeographic regions of south-western Western Australia.

== Conservation status ==
Grevillea candicans has been listed as vulnerable on the IUCN Red List of Threatened Species as it has an estimated extent of occurrence (EOO) of less than 12,000 km^{2} (4,600 sq mi), a severely fragmented range and a population decline of greater than 30% within the past three generations (75 years) due to habitat clearing for roads and agriculture. Current major threats to this species include the clearance of road verges where the species is found and weed invasion.

It is also listed as priority three by the Government of Western Australia Department of Biodiversity, Conservation and Attractions, meaning that it is poorly known and known from only a few locations but is not under imminent threat.
