= Grevillea scabrida =

Conservation status
- Priority Three — Poorly Known Taxa (DEC)

Scientific classification
- Kingdom: Plantae
- Clade: Tracheophytes
- Clade: Angiosperms
- Clade: Eudicots
- Order: Proteales
- Family: Proteaceae
- Genus: Grevillea
- Species: G. scabrida

Binomial name
- Grevillea scabrida C.A.Gardner

Species of shrub endemic to Western Australia

Grevillea scabrida is a species of flowering plant in the family Proteaceae and is endemic to the south-west of Western Australia. It is a densely-branched shrub with linear leaves and erect clusters of white flowers.

== Description ==
Grevillea scabrida is an erect, densely-branched shrub that typically grows to a height of 0.6–1.5 m (2 ft 0 in – 4 ft 11 in) and has distinctive red, angular branchlets. Its leaves are linear, 10–50 mm (0.39–1.97 in) long and 0.5–1.3 mm (0.020–0.051 in) wide with 3 to 5 prominent longitudinal veins. The edges of the leaves are rolled under, obscuring most of the lower surface, and the upper surface is rough to the touch. The flowers are arranged on the ends of branches on short side branches in erect clusters on a rachis 0.8–2 mm (0.031–0.079 in) long. The flowers are greenish-yellow in the bud stage, later white, the style whitish, turning pink with age, the pistil 7.0–8.5 mm (0.28–0.33 in) long. Flowering has been observed in July, and the fruit is an erect, more or less oval follicle on a stalk 9–11.5 mm (0.35–0.45 in) long.

This grevillea is similar to G. lissopleura, but that species has smooth leaves and straight branchlets. Grevillea scabrida probably only regenerates from seed.

== Taxonomy ==
Grevillea scabrida was first formally described by the botanist Charles Austin Gardner in 1936 in the Journal of the Royal Society of Western Australia from specimens he collected with William Blackall "near the northern base of Mount Singleton" in 1931. The specific epithet (scabrida) means "rough or gritty to the touch".

== Distribution and habitat ==
This grevillea grows in red clay loam, stony loam or laterite and is only known in the Mount Singleton to Mount Gibson area between Wubin and Paynes Find in the Avon Wheatbelt and Yalgoo bioregions of south-western Western Australia.

== Conservation status ==
Grevillea scabrida is listed as "Priority Three" by the Government of Western Australia Department of Biodiversity, Conservation and Attractions, meaning that it is poorly known and known from only a few locations but is not under imminent threat.

== See also ==
- List of Grevillea species
