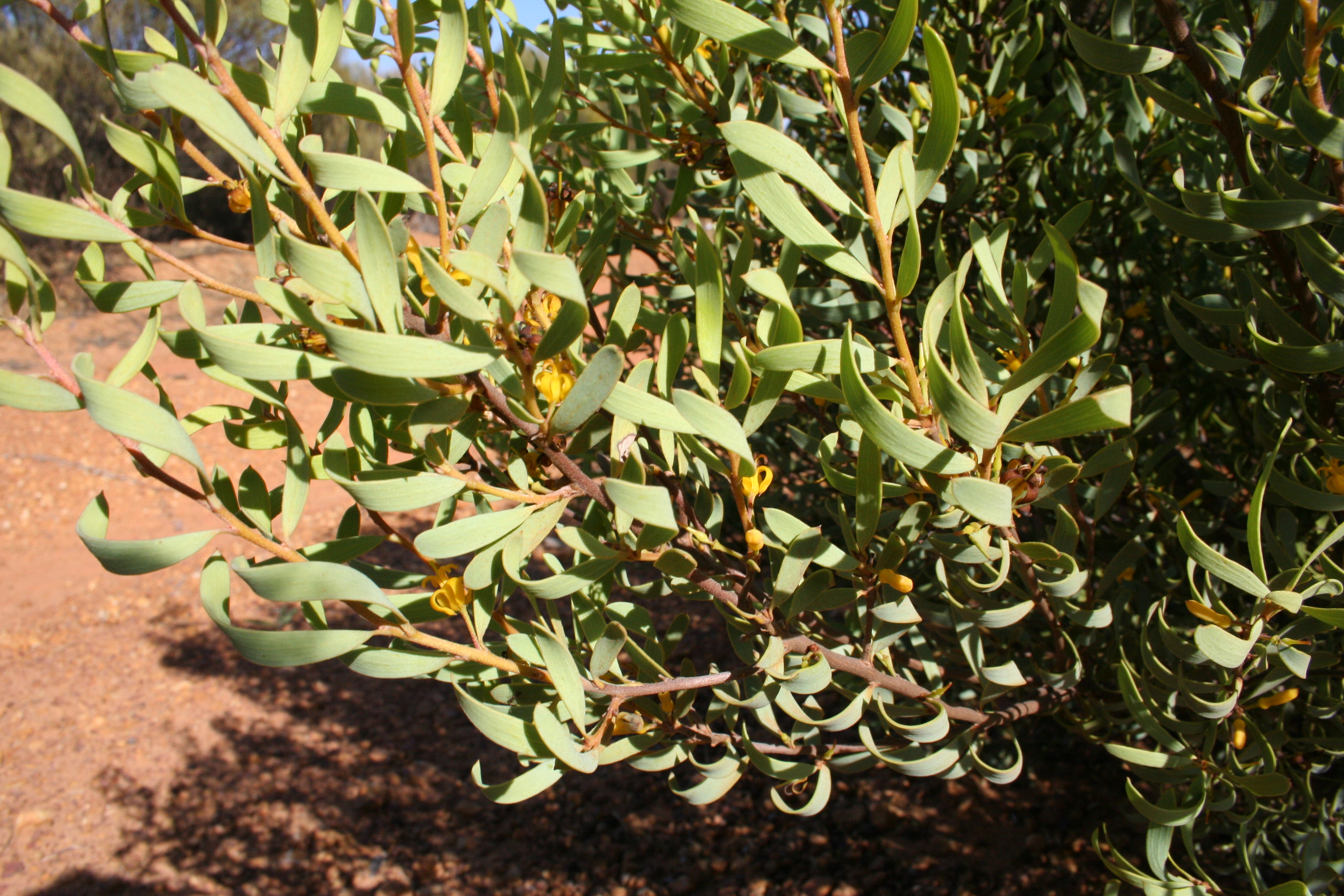

Scientific classification
- Kingdom: Plantae
- Clade: Tracheophytes
- Clade: Angiosperms
- Clade: Eudicots
- Order: Proteales
- Family: Proteaceae
- Genus: Persoonia
- Species: P. coriacea

Binomial name
- Persoonia coriacea Audas & P.Morris
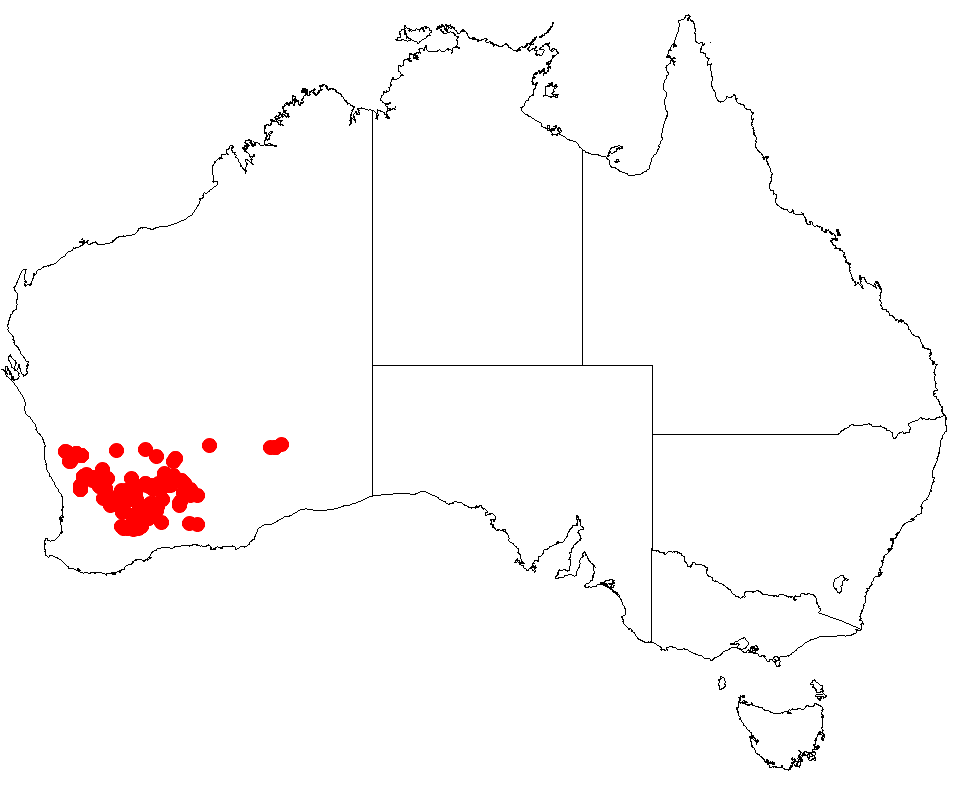
- Occurrence data downloaded from AVH

= Persoonia coriacea =

Leathery-leaf persoonia

Species of flowering plant

Persoonia coriacea, commonly known as the leathery-leaf persoonia, is a species of flowering plant in the family Proteaceae and is endemic to the south-west of Western Australia. It is an erect to spreading shrub with smooth bark, spatula-shaped or elliptic to linear leaves and bright yellow flowers borne in groups of up to ten along a rachis up to 70 mm (2.8 in) long.

== Description ==
Persoonia cordifolia is an erect to spreading shrub that typically grows to a height of 0.3–2 m (1 ft 0 in – 6 ft 7 in) with several to many stems arising from the base and has smooth, mottled grey bark. The branches and leaves are hairy at first but become glabrous with age. The leaves are arranged alternately, spatula-shaped or elliptic to linear, 20–65 mm (0.79–2.56 in) long, 3–13 mm (0.12–0.51 in) wide and twisted through up to 90° so that the leaves are held in the vertical plane. Some populations, such as plants near Yellowdine, have more twisted leaves than others. The flowers are arranged in groups of up to ten along a rachis up to 70 mm (2.8 in) long that usually grows into a leafy shoot after flowering, each flower on a pedicel 2.5–9 mm (0.098–0.354 in) long. The tepals are bright yellow, 6.5–11.5 mm (0.26–0.45 in) long with bright yellow anthers. Flowering occurs from November to February and the fruit is an oval drupe 7–13 mm (0.28–0.51 in) long and 5–7 mm (0.20–0.28 in) wide containing a single seed.

== Taxonomy and naming ==
Persoonia coriacea was first formally described in 1928 by James Wales Claredon Audas and Patrick Francis Morris from specimens collected by Max Koch near Merredin on 30 November 1923. The description was published in the Journal of the Royal Society of Western Australia. Within the genus Persoonia, P. coriacea is classified in the lanceolata group, a group of 54 closely related species with similar flowers but very different foliage. These species will often interbreed with each other where two members of the group occur. In the case of this species, it hybridizes with P. helix.

== Distribution and habitat ==
Persoonia coriacea is found in the southwest of Western Australia, from Carnamah southwards to Lake Grace and Lake King and east across to Plumridge Lakes. It grows on yellow sand dunes or sandplains, or on sandy clay soils, sometimes over laterite, red sand or granite and occurs in heathland and mallee heath plant communities. The uncommon blue-breasted fairywren has been recorded using this shrub as a nest site.

== Use in horticulture ==
Held to have little horticultural appeal, Persoonia coriacea is not known to be cultivated.
