= HRZ =

HRZ may refer to:

- Croatian Air Force (Croatian: Hrvatsko ratno zrakoplovstvo)
- Croatian Republican Union (Croatian: Hrvatska republikanska zajednica)
- Herzliya Airport, in Israel
- High Rainfall Zone, in Australia
- Harzandi dialect of the Tati language, spoken in Iran
- Zanzibar House of Representatives
