= TRZ =

TRZ may refer to:

- Transitional Rainfall Zone
- TransMeridian Airlines
- Trizec Properties
- Tiruchirappalli International Airport
