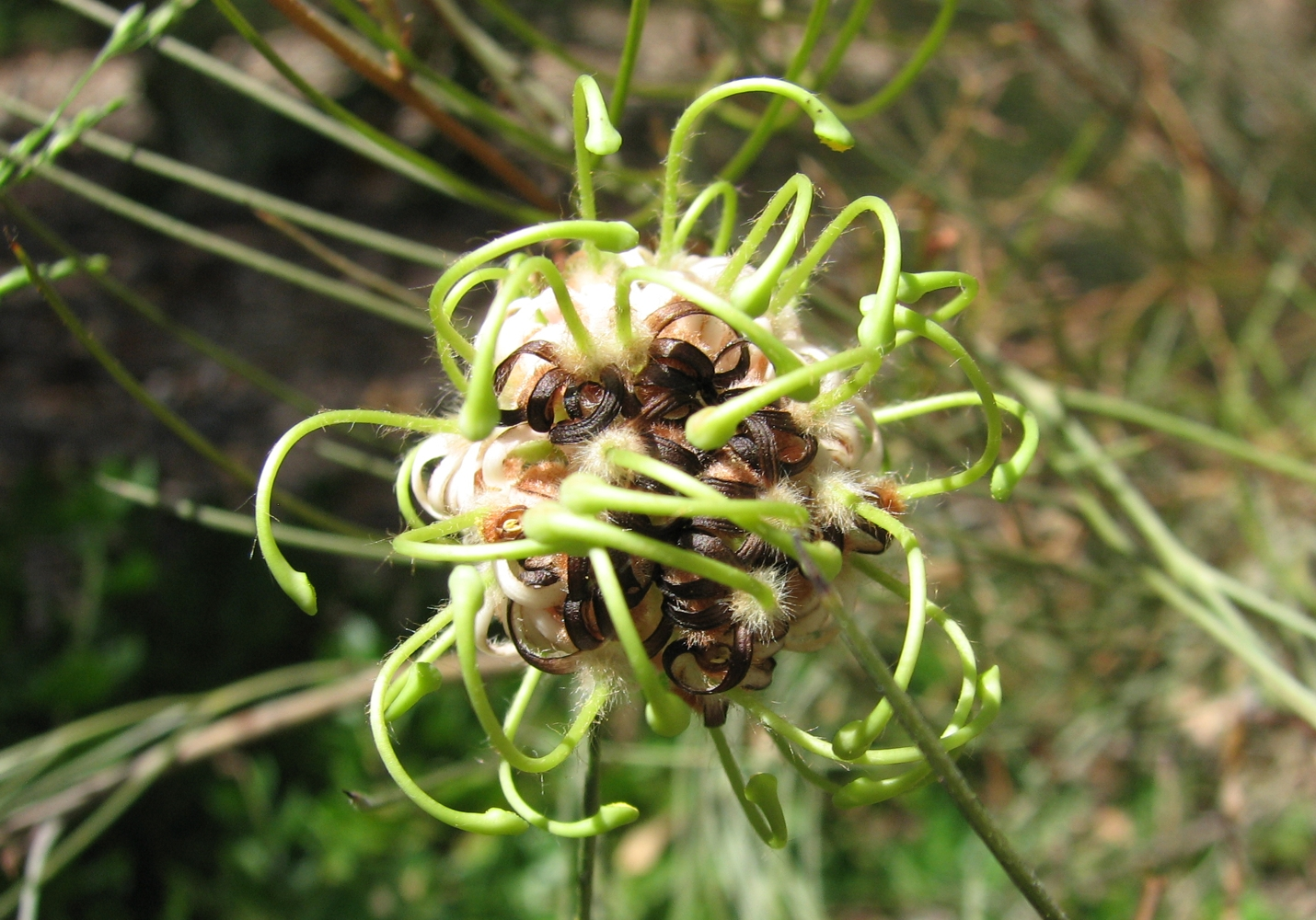
- In Maranoa Gardens

Conservation status
- Least Concern (IUCN 3.1)

- Priority Three — Poorly Known Taxa (DEC)

Scientific classification
- Kingdom: Plantae
- Clade: Embryophytes
- Clade: Tracheophytes
- Clade: Angiosperms
- Clade: Eudicots
- Order: Proteales
- Family: Proteaceae
- Genus: Grevillea
- Species: G. globosa

Binomial name
- Grevillea globosa C.A.Gardner

= Grevillea globosa =

Species of shrub endemic to Western Australia

Grevillea globosa is a species of flowering plant in the family Proteaceae and is endemic to the south-west of Western Australia. It is a spreading shrub with deeply divided leaves that have three to nine linear lobes, and dense, spherical clusters of pale green, creamy-green and reddish-brown flowers.

== Description ==
Grevillea globosa is a spreading shrub that typically grows to a height of 1–3 m (3 ft 3 in – 9 ft 10 in) but does not form a lignotuber. Its leaves are erect 80–180 mm (3.1–7.1 in) long and deeply divided with three to nine usually linear lobes, 0.5–1.0 mm (0.020–0.039 in) wide with the edges rolled under, concealing all but the prominent midvein. The flowers are arranged in dense, spherical groups in leaf axils or on the ends of branches on a hairy rachis 5–8 mm (0.20–0.31 in) long. The flowers are pale green to whitish, creamy-green and hairy, turning black as they age, the pistil 13–22 mm (0.51–0.87 in) long, the style greenish. Flowering occurs sporadically throughout the year and the fruit is an oblong follicle 9–12.5 mm (0.35–0.49 in) long.

== Taxonomy ==
Grevillea globosa was first formally described by Charles Austin Gardner in 1964 in the Journal of the Royal Society of Western Australia from specimens collected by Fred Lullfitz to the north of Pindar. The specific epithet (globosa) means "spherical", referring to the flower clusters.

== Distribution and habitat ==
This grevillea grows in mulga shrubland or mallee woodland between Lake Moore and near Pindar in the Avon Wheatbelt and Yalgoo biogeographic regions of south-western Western Australia.

== Conservation status ==
Grevillea globosa is listed as least concern on the IUCN Red List of Threatened Species. Although its estimated extent of occurrence is approximately 9,000 km^{2} (3,500 sq mi), it may occur over a wider range and its population appears currently stable. In general, there are no known major threats to this species at present. Feral goats graze upon the seedlings of the species, though this is not considered a major threat. No additional conservation measures are currently necessary for this species.

It is also classified as priority three by the Government of Western Australia Department of Biodiversity, Conservation and Attractions, meaning that it is poorly known and known from only a few locations but is not under imminent threat.
