= Transitional Rainfall Zone =

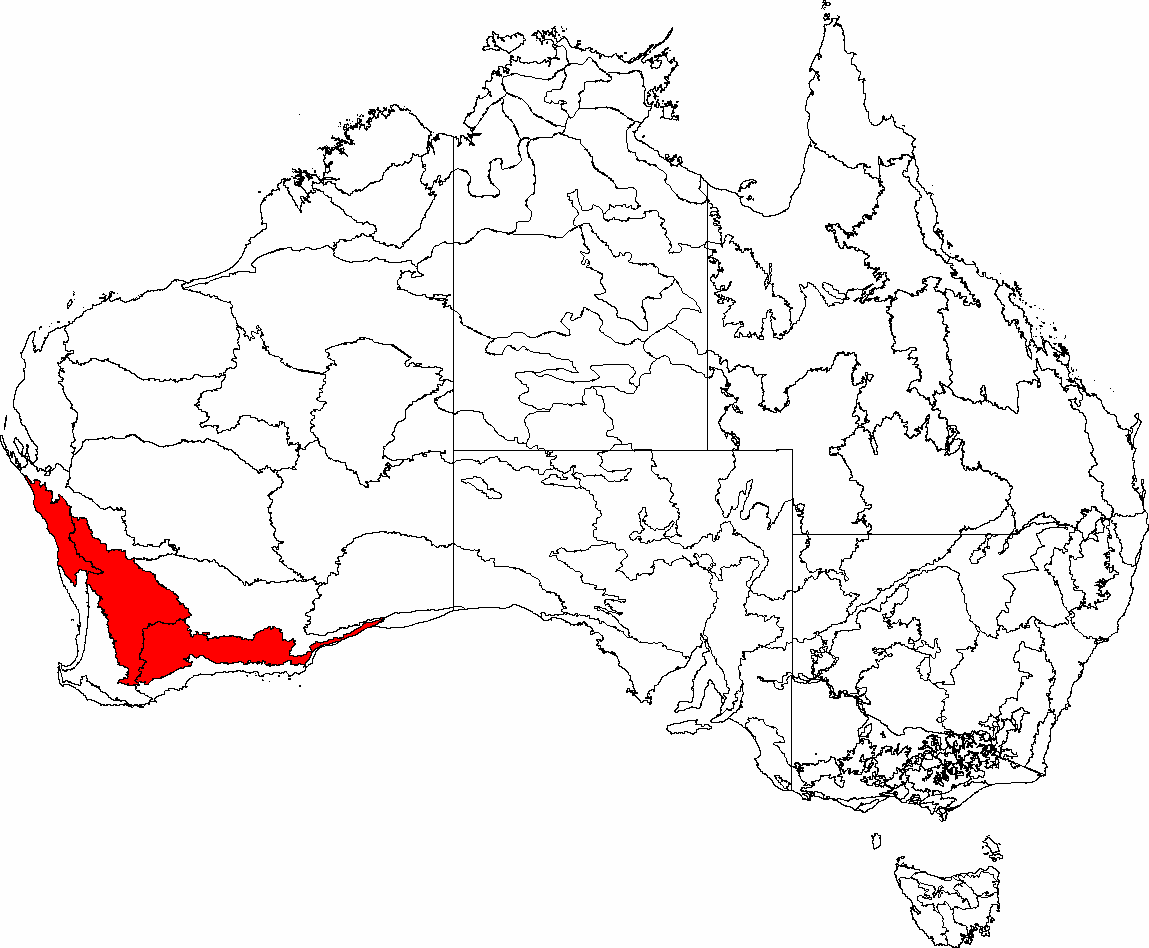
The IBRA regions, with regions of the Transitional Rainfall Zone shown in red

The Transitional Rainfall Zone (TRZ) is one of three biogeographic zones into which south-west Western Australia is divided, the others being the High Rainfall Zone and the Low Rainfall Zone. The TRZ is recognised as having a much higher diversity of rare and endemic plant species than the other Zones.

The Zones were first defined by Stephen Hopper in his 1979 paper Biogeographical aspects of speciation in the southwest Australian flora. Initially, they were defined in terms of rainfall, with the TRZ being that part of the South West with annual rainfall of between 300 and 800 millimetres (12–31 in). However, following the publication of John Stanley Beard's phytogeographic regionalisation of Western Australia in 1980, it was recognised that Hopper's zones could be defined as aggregates of Beard's botanic districts. The Transitional Rainfall Zone was subsequently re-defined as equivalent to Beard's Roe, Avon and Irwin Botanical Districts, later renamed Northern Sandplains Region, Wheat Belt Region and Mallee Region respectively. When the Interim Biogeographic Regionalisation for Australia (IBRA) was published in the 1990s, Beard's regionalisation was adopted as the baseline for Western Australia. All three of the TRZ regions were accepted as IBRA regions, albeit with slightly different titles. Thus the TRZ is now defined as the aggregate of the Geraldton Sandplains, Avon Wheatbelt and Mallee IBRA regions.

The TRZ is widely recognised as having very high species diversity and endemism compared to the other zones. Some botanists have claimed that this is due to the species richness of the near-coastal heathlands at the north-western and south-eastern extremes of the zone, suggesting that the intervening Wheatbelt region is relatively species poor. Other botanists have refuted this, however, claiming that the entire TRZ is species rich compared to the other zones.

== See also ==
- Vegetation Survey of Western Australia
