= LRZ =

LRZ may refer to:

- Louis Rees-Zammit
- Low Rainfall Zone
- Leibniz-Rechenzentrum, German computing facility
- Landesrundfunkzentrale Mecklenburg-Vorpommern, German regional media authority
- The file extension used by lrzip
