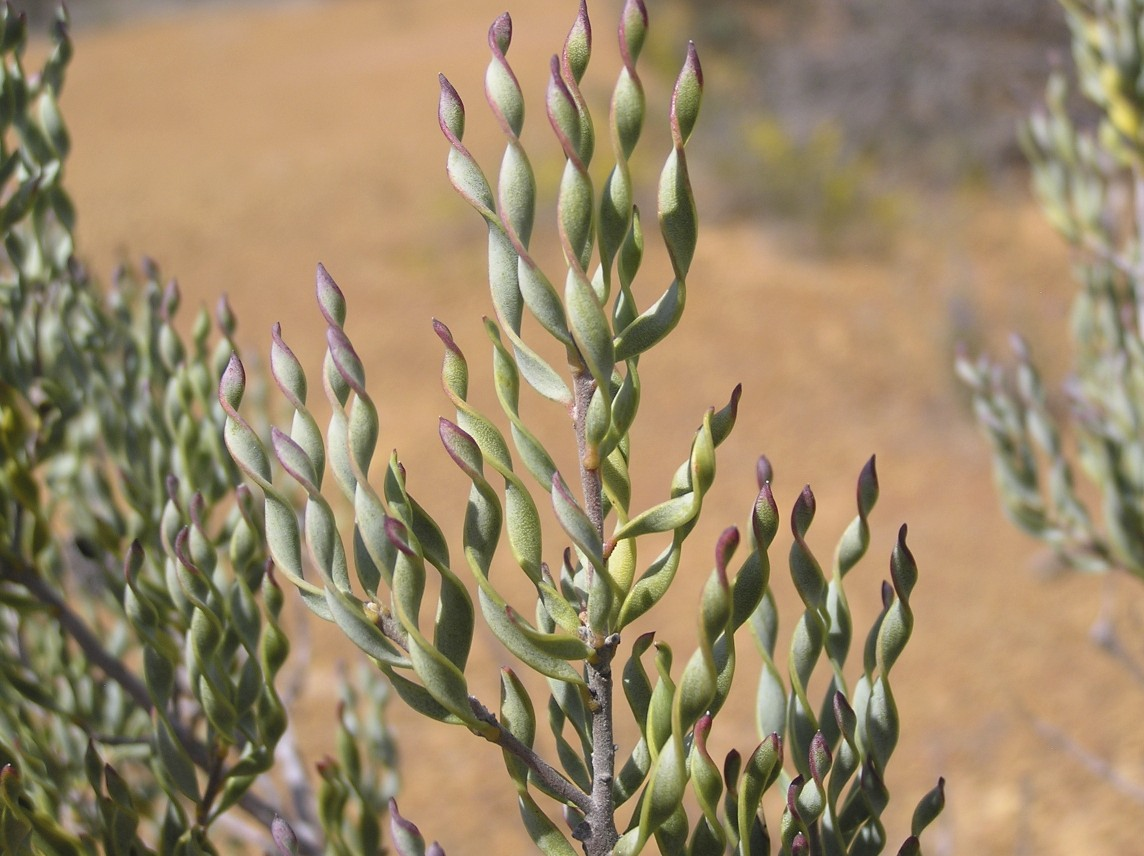

Scientific classification
- Kingdom: Plantae
- Clade: Tracheophytes
- Clade: Angiosperms
- Clade: Eudicots
- Order: Proteales
- Family: Proteaceae
- Genus: Persoonia
- Species: P. helix

Binomial name
- Persoonia helix P.H.Weston
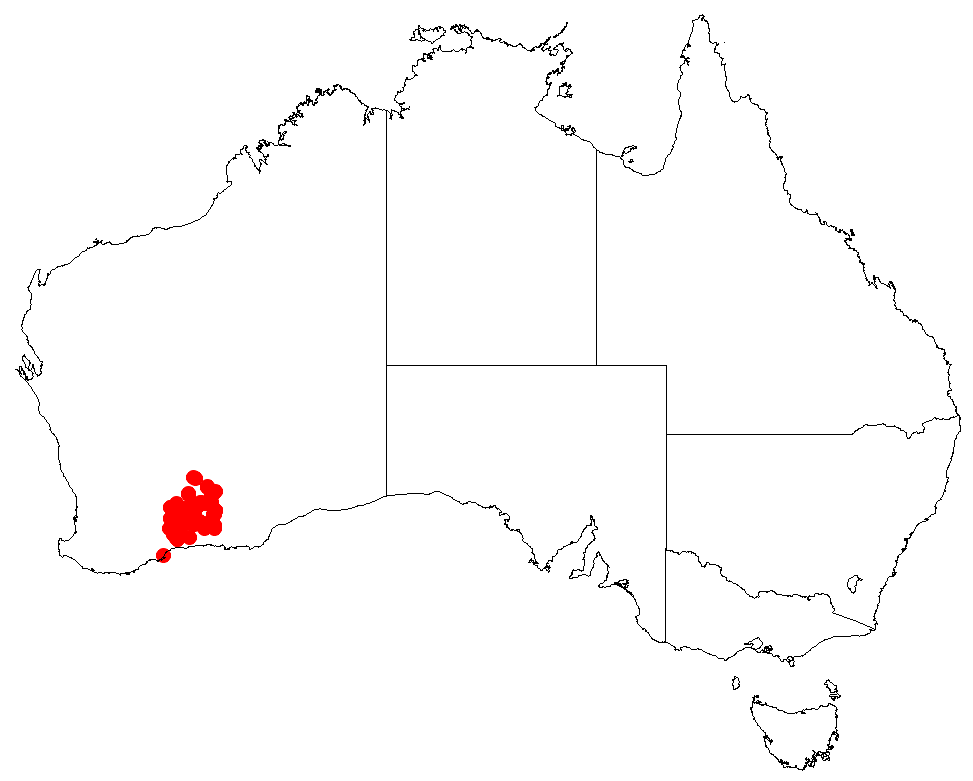
- Occurrence data from Australasian Virtual Herbarium

= Persoonia helix =

Species of flowering plant

Persoonia helix is a species of flowering plant in the family Proteaceae and is endemic to the south-west of Western Australia. It is an erect to spreading shrub with hairy young branchlets, twisted leaves and bright yellow flowers borne singly or in groups of up to five on a rachis up to 25 mm (0.98 in) long.

== Description ==
Persoonia helix is an erect to spreading shrub that typically grows to a height of 0.4–2.8 m (1 ft 4 in – 9 ft 2 in) with smooth bark and branchlets that are hairy for the first two or three years. The leaves are arranged alternately, mostly linear 20–60 mm (0.79–2.36 in) long and 1.5–4 mm (0.059–0.157 in) wide but twisted through up to six complete turns. The flowers are arranged singly or in groups of up to five along a rachis up to 25 mm (0.98 in) long that usually grows into a leafy shoot after flowering, each flower on a pedicel 3–6 mm (0.12–0.24 in) long. The tepals are bright yellow, 8–11 mm (0.31–0.43 in) long with bright yellow anthers that curve outwards near their tips. Flowering occurs from November to December or January to February and the fruit is a smooth, oval drupe 7–9.5 mm (0.28–0.37 in) long and 4.5–7 mm (0.18–0.28 in) wide.

== Taxonomy ==
Persoonia helix was first formally described in 1994 by Peter Weston in the journal Telopea from specimens collected by Fred Lullfitz near Forrestania in 1964.

== Distribution and habitat ==
This geebung grows in heath and woodland in the area between Kalgoorlie, Hyden, Ravensthorpe and Salmon Gums in the Coolgardie, Esperance Plains and Mallee biogeographic regions.

== Conservation status ==
This species is classified as "not threatened" by the Western Australian Government Department of Parks and Wildlife.
