= High Rainfall Zone =

One of three biogeographic zones into which south west Western Australia is divided

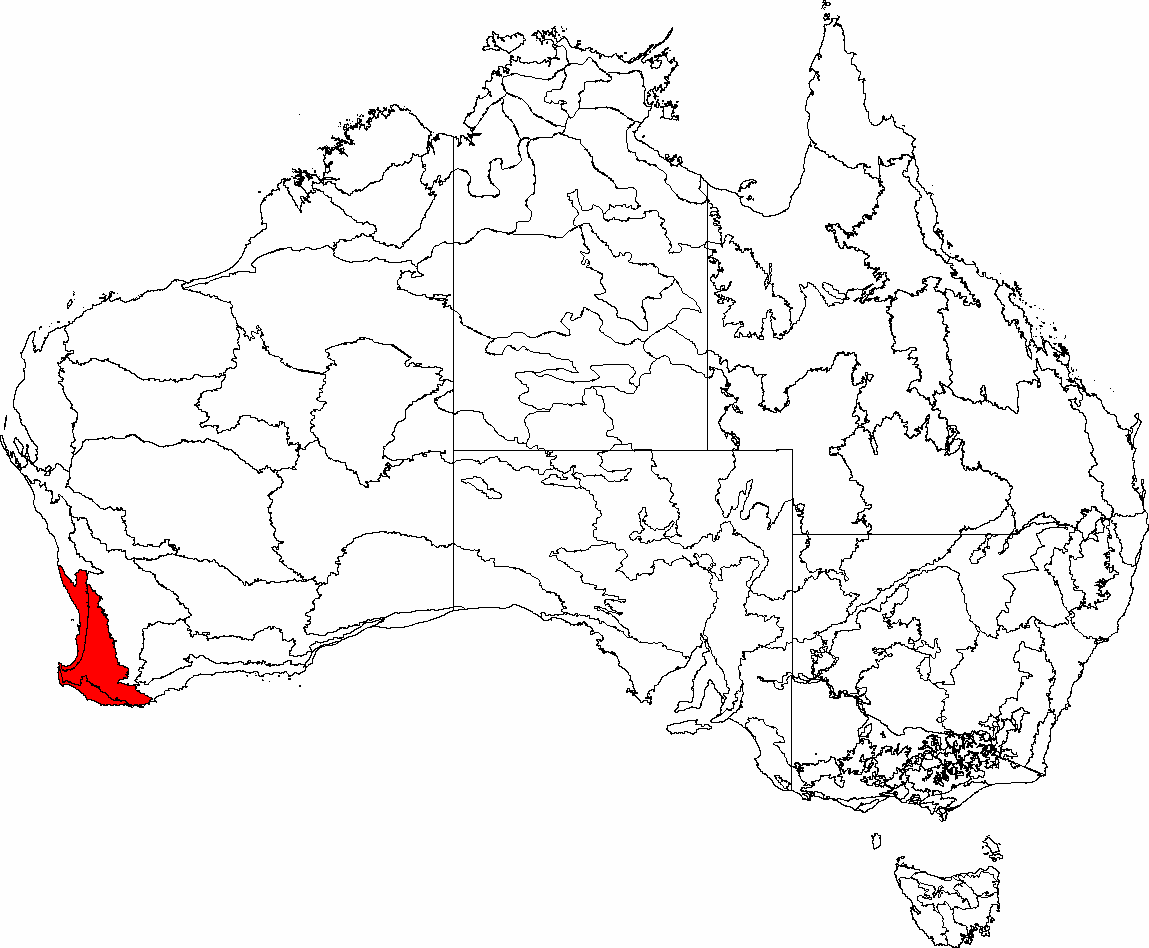
The IBRA regions, with regions of the High Rainfall Zone shown in red.

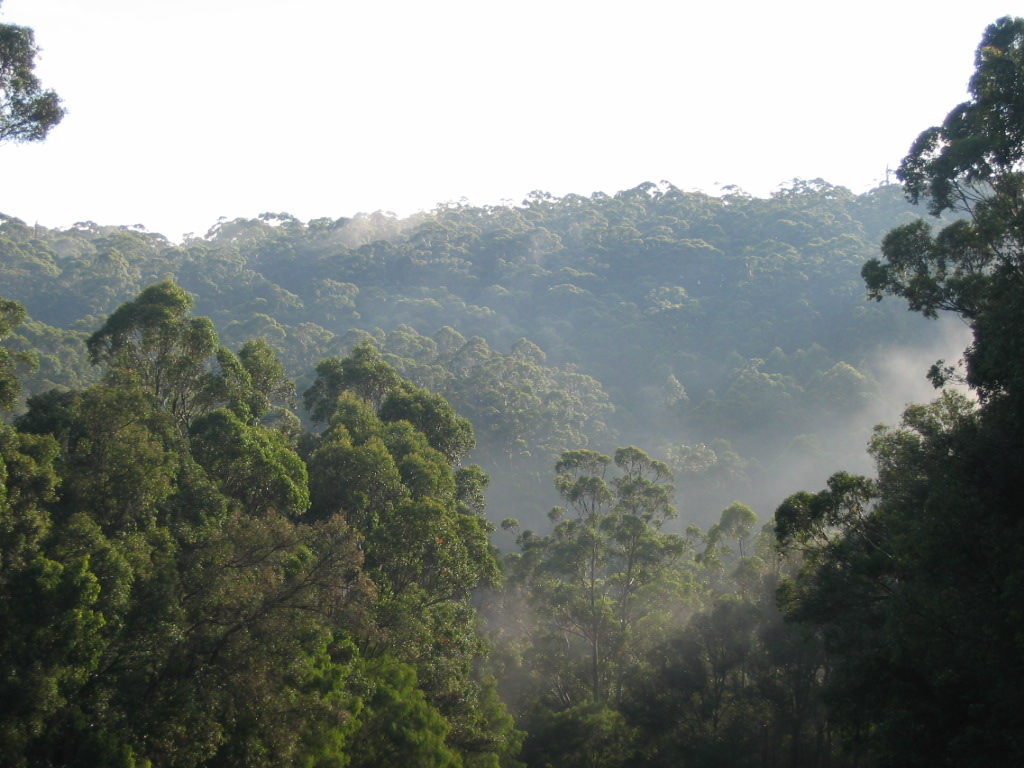
Karri forest in the Warren region, part of the High Rainfall Zone. Rainfall in the Karri forests is the highest in the South West Botanic Province.

The High Rainfall Zone is one of three biogeographic zones into which south west Western Australia is divided, the others being the Transitional Rainfall Zone and the Low Rainfall Zone.

The zones were first defined by Stephen Hopper in his 1979 paper Biogeographical aspects of speciation in the southwest Australian flora. Initially they were defined in terms of rainfall, with the High Rainfall Zone being that part of the south west with annual rainfall of more than 800 millimetres (31 in). However, following the publication of John Stanley Beard's phytogeographic regionalisation of Western Australia in 1980, it was recognised that Hopper's zones could be defined as aggregates of Beard's botanic districts. The High Rainfall Zone was subsequently re-defined as equivalent to Beard's "Darling Botanical District", later renamed the "South-west Forest Region". When the Interim Biogeographic Regionalisation for Australia (IBRA) was published in the 1990s, Beard's regionalisation was adopted as the baseline for Western Australia. The South-west Forest Region was divided into three IBRA regions: Warren, Jarrah Forest and Swan Coastal Plain. Hence the High Rainfall Zone is now defined as the aggregate of these three IBRA regions.
