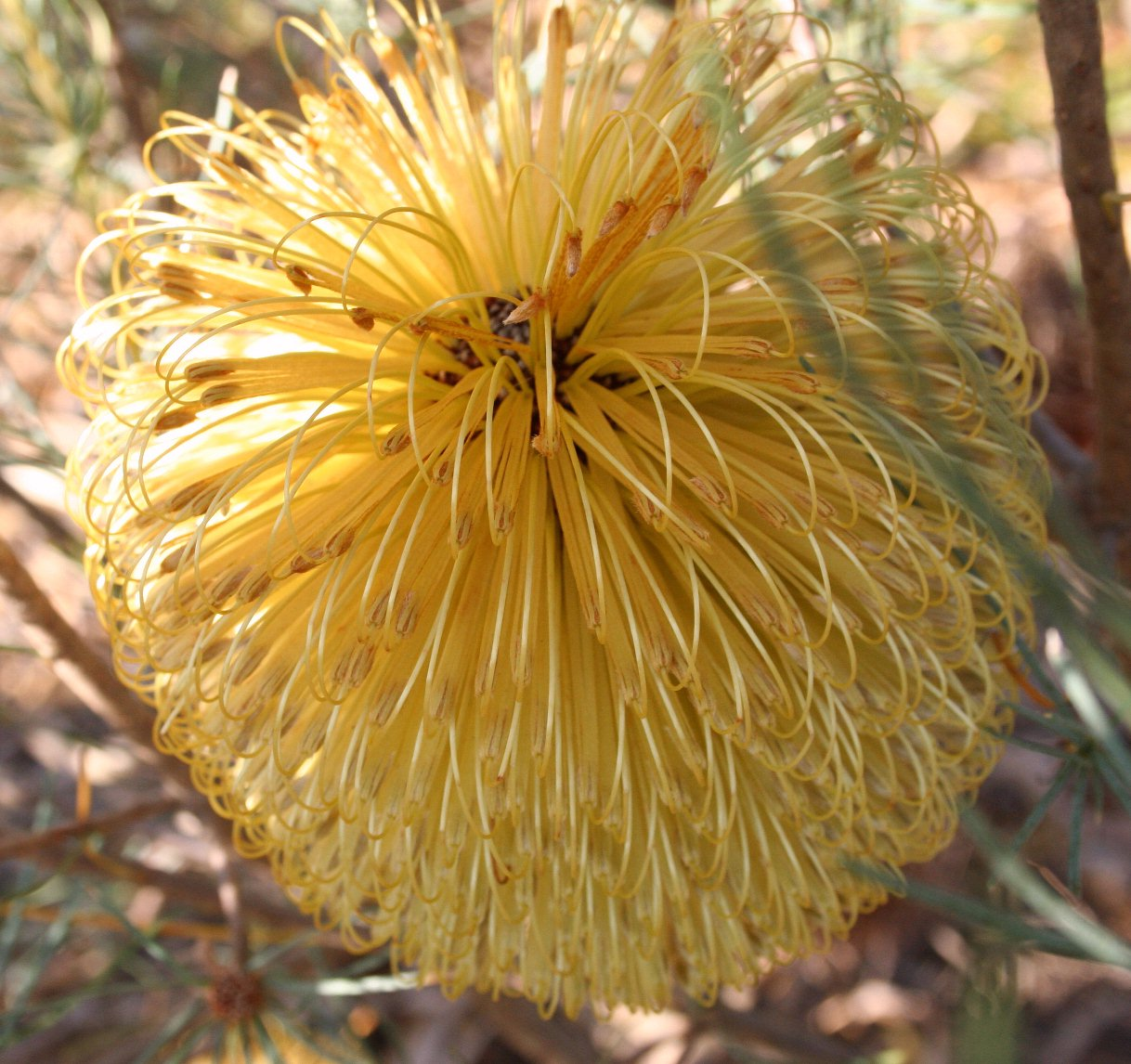

Scientific classification
- Kingdom: Plantae
- Clade: Tracheophytes
- Clade: Angiosperms
- Clade: Eudicots
- Order: Proteales
- Family: Proteaceae
- Genus: Banksia
- Species: B. sphaerocarpa
- Variety: B. s. var. dolichostyla

Trinomial name
- Banksia sphaerocarpa var. dolichostyla A.S.George

= Banksia sphaerocarpa var. dolichostyla =

Variety of shrub

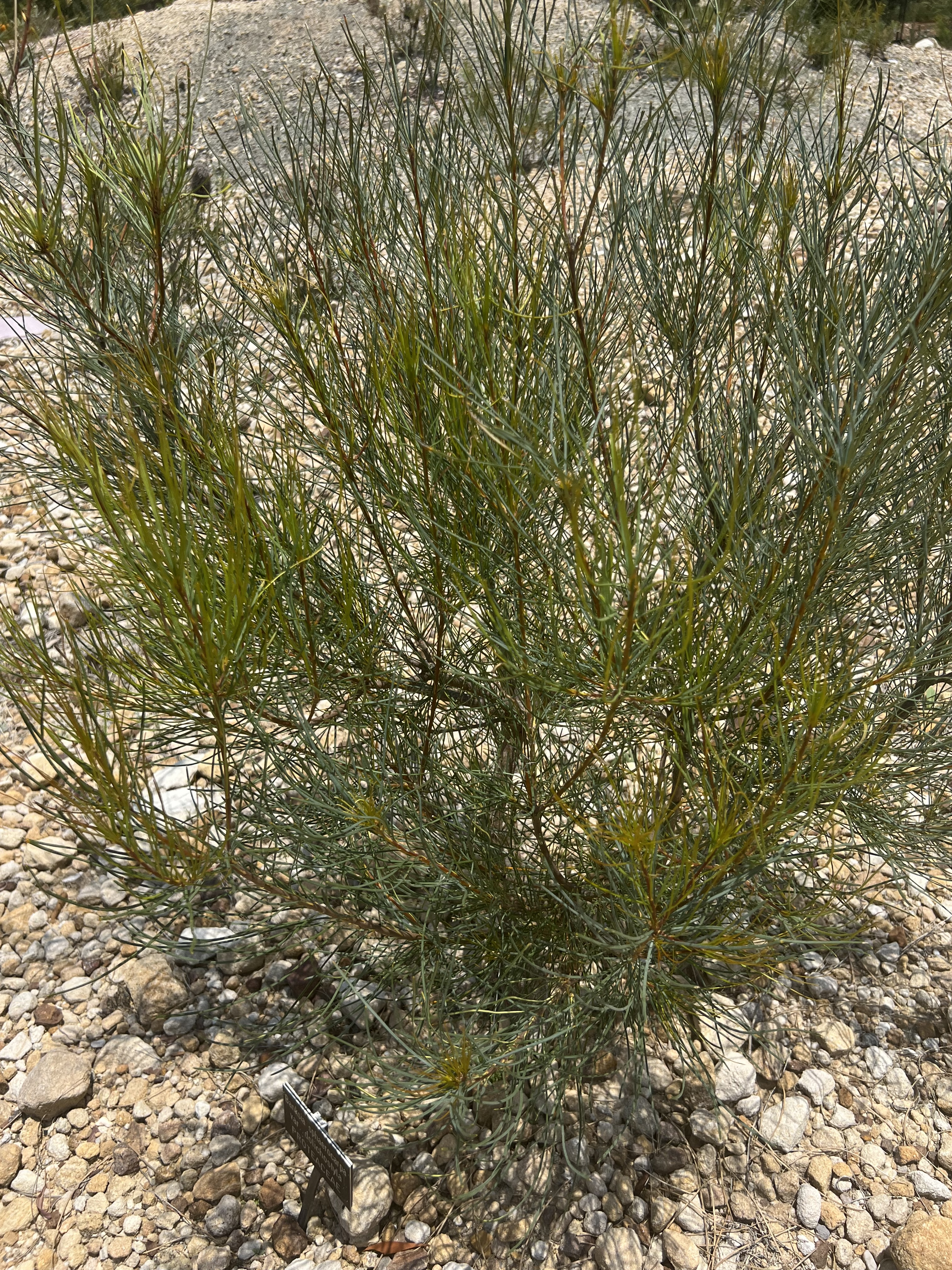
Habit

Banksia sphaerocarpa var. dolichostyla, commonly known as Ironcap Banksia, is a plant which is either considered a variety of Banksia sphaerocarpa, or as a species in its own right. It is native to the Southwest Botanical Province of Western Australia. Seeds do not require any treatment, and take around 33 days to germinate.

== Description ==
The Ironcap Banksia is an open, spreading, woody shrub some 3–4 m (10–13 ft) high by up to 4 m (13 ft) wide. The foliage is glaucous (pale blue-grey), with bright green new growth. The roundish to elongated golden-yellow inflorescences appear in autumn, larger and more elongate than spherical as with the other forms of B. sphaerocarpa. It derives its name from its 50–65 mm long pistils, the longest of any banksia, and perianth (49–55 mm). The grey old flowers remain on the old cones.

== Taxonomy ==
First collected by botanist Alex George in 1978, it was officially described in the 1981 revision of the genus Banksia as a variety of Banksia sphaerocarpa. The specific epithet was derived from the Ancient Greek words dolichos "long" and stylos "pillar", in reference to the long styles.

Botanist and plant taxonomist Kevin Thiele analysed the morphometrics in his cladistic paper of 1996, and announced that the Ironcap banksia warranted specific status. He analysed Banksia micrantha as the sister group to the pair of B. sphaerocarpa var. sphaerocarpa and B. sphaerocarpa var. caesia, and noted that the Ironcap banksia, which was a sister taxon to this combined group, had stouter old styles on old cones which did not curl around, while those of the other varieties curled around the infructescence to form a ball.

George replied in the 1999 Flora of Australia treatment of Banksia that he did not feel this character alone justified specific rank, and that otherwise the plant was merely larger in all parts to var. caesia but essentially similar.

In 2002, Austin Mast's molecular study yielded a surprise when molecular analysis mapped out the Ironcap banksia as a sister taxon to its geographical neighbour B. violacea in a larger group together with B. laricina and B. incana. Banksia micrantha and the two remaining sphaerocarpa varieties form a related group.

== Conservation ==
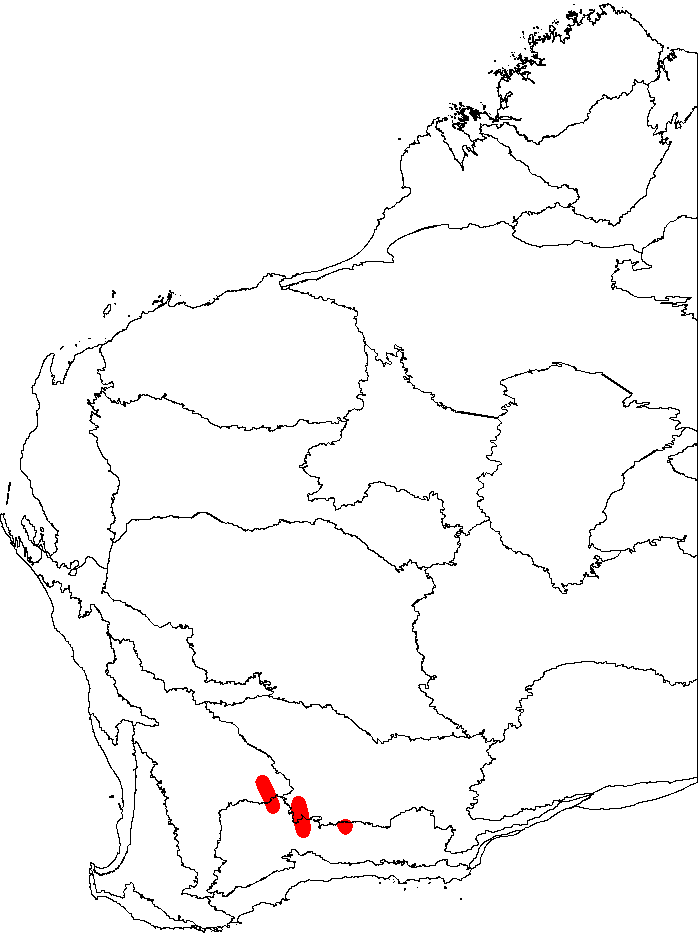
Distribution

Banksia sphaerocarpa var. dolichostyla has been declared Rare flora by the Western Australian state government; its status is deemed to be in the wild either rare, in danger of extinction, or otherwise in need of special protection, and has been gazetted as such, following approval by the Minister for the Environment, after recommendation by the State's Endangered Flora Consultative Committee.
