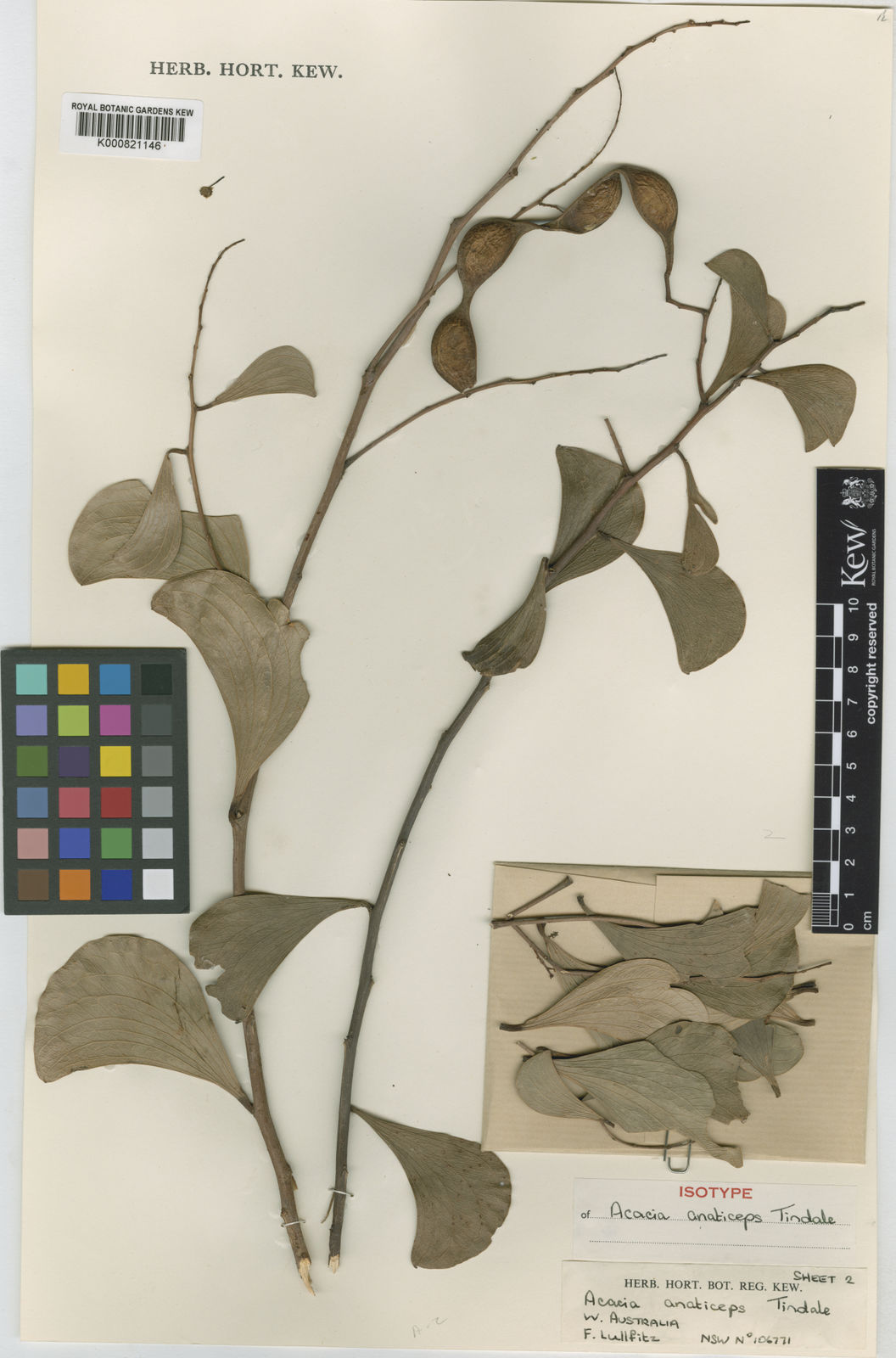

Conservation status
- Least Concern (IUCN 3.1)

Scientific classification
- Kingdom: Plantae
- Clade: Embryophytes
- Clade: Tracheophytes
- Clade: Spermatophytes
- Clade: Angiosperms
- Clade: Eudicots
- Clade: Rosids
- Order: Fabales
- Family: Fabaceae
- Subfamily: Caesalpinioideae
- Clade: Mimosoid clade
- Genus: Acacia
- Species: A. anaticeps

Binomial name
- Acacia anaticeps Tindale
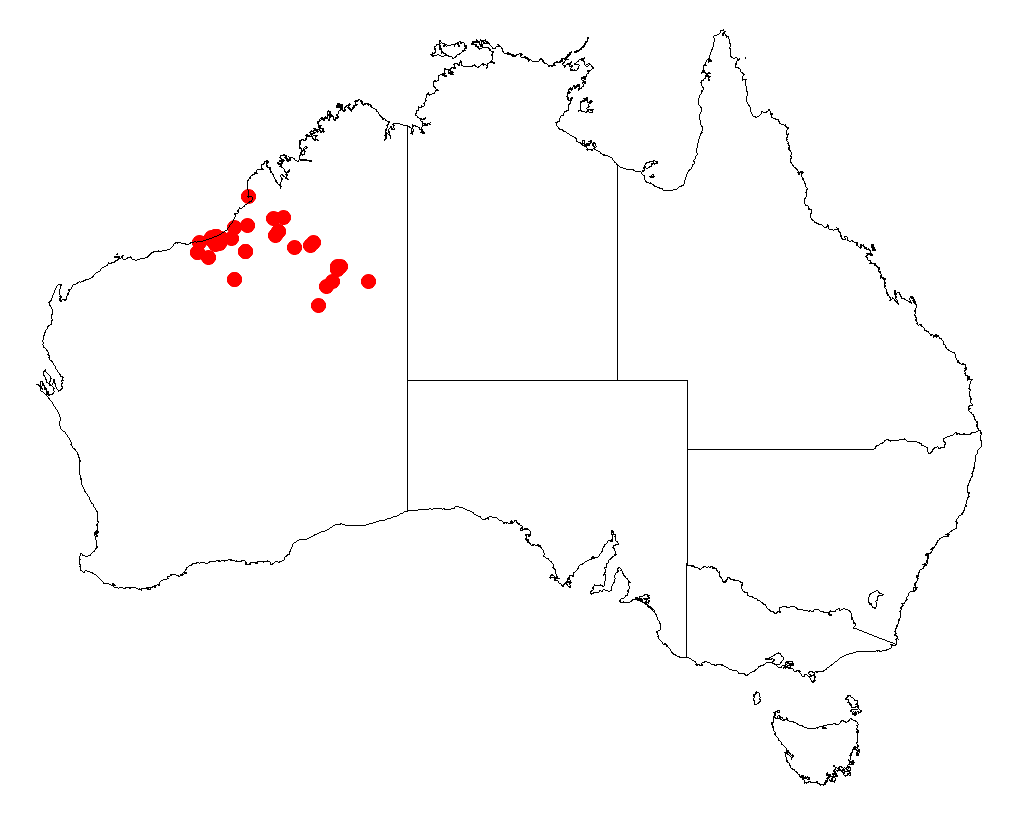

= Acacia anaticeps =

Duck-headed wattle

Species of legume

Acacia anaticeps, also known as duck-headed wattle, is a species of flowering plant in the family Fabaceae and is endemic to northern Western Australia. It is a shrubby tree with corky bark, curved, egg-shaped to elliptic phyllodes, racemes or panicles of heads each with 4 to 7 cream-coloured flowers, and curved pods resembling a string of beads.

== Description ==
Acacia anaticeps is a shrubby tree that typically grows to a height of 1–4 m (3 ft 3 in – 13 ft 1 in), sometimes to 7 m (23 ft) and has deeply furrowed grey bark. Its phyllodes are egg-shaped with the narrower end towards the base, to more or less fan-shaped, mostly 40–70 mm (1.6–2.8 in) long, 20–50 mm (0.79–1.97 in) wide, leathery and glabrous with mostly 5 to 7 longitudinal veins. The flowers are arranged in racemes or panicles on the ends of branches or in leaf axils, on a glabrous peduncle 2–5 mm (0.079–0.197 in) long. Each head is 2.0–2.5 mm (0.079–0.098 in) in diameter and has 4 to 7 cream-coloured flowers. Flowering occurs from April to June, and the pods are crust-like to woody, raised over the seeds and resembling a string of beads, straight to strongly curved or twisted, up to 280 mm (11 in) long and 10–20 mm (0.39–0.79 in) wide with dull brown, broadly elliptic to circular seeds 9.5–14 mm (0.37–0.55 in) long.

== Taxonomy ==
Acacia anaticeps was first formally described in 1972 by Mary Douglas Tindale in Contributions from the New South Wales National Herbarium, from specimens collected near Wallal Downs homestead by Fred Lullfitz in 1970. The specific epithet (anaticeps) means 'duck-headed', referring to the shape of the phyllodes.

== Distribution and habitat ==
This species of wattle is endemic to arid areas in the Kimberley and Pilbara regions of Western Australia where it is often situated on sand dunes and pindan country growing in red sandy or sandy-loamy soils. The range of the plant extends from the northern boundary of the Pilbara region northwards to around Broome in the north west to around Kumpupintil Lake and Lake Gregory in the east and is sometimes found on heavier, sometimes saline, soils.

== See also ==
- List of Acacia species
