= Vegetation Survey of Western Australia =

The Vegetation Survey of Western Australia commenced as a project of the Department of Geography of the University of Western Australia to provide vegetation maps for the state on the scales of 1:250,000 and 1:1,000,000. There were some offshoot publications apart from the maps and notes. The main author and worker of the project was John Stanley Beard, who was appointed a Member of the Order of Australia for the work in 2003.

The maps correlated broadly to the main regional names:

1. Kimberley
2. Great Sandy Desert
3. Great Victoria Desert
4. Nullarbor
5. Pilbara
6. Murchison
7. Swan

== See also ==
- Florabase
- IBRA
- The Western Australian Flora—A Descriptive Catalogue
