= How to Know Western Australian Wildflowers =

Book series

How to Know Western Australian Wildflowers is a series of books that provide illustrated keys to the vascular flora of the southern half of Western Australia.

It was conceived by William Blackall, who prepared a great deal of manuscript material before his death in 1941. Blackall's family then asked the University of Western Australia to see that it was completed and published, and this task was given to Brian Grieve. The first volume was published in 1954 , and was the first book published by University of Western Australia Press; authorship was attributed to Blackall, with Grieve claiming editorship.

The second and third volumes were published in 1956 and 1965, with authorship attributed to "Blackall and Grieve". Part 4, published in 1975, was attributed to "Grieve and Blackall". The books were subsequently republished in a number of formats, and a second edition was published in the 1980s.

== List of volumes ==
=== 1st edition ===
- Blackall, W. E.; Grieve, B. J. (ed) (1954) How to know Western Australian wildflowers. Part I.
- Blackall, W. E. and Grieve, B. J. (1956) How to know Western Australian wildflowers. Part II.
- Blackall, W. E. and Grieve, B. J. (1965) How to know Western Australian wildflowers. Part III; fair copy scripted by Yvonne Chadwick
- Blackall, W. E. and Grieve, B. J. (1974) How to know Western Australian wildflowers. Parts I, II, III.
- Grieve, B. J. (1975) How to know Western Australian wildflowers. Part IV

=== 2nd edition ===
- Blackall, W. E. and Grieve, B. J. (1980) How to know Western Australian wildflowers (2nd edition). Part IIIA.
- Blackall, W. E. and Grieve, B. J. (1981) How to know Western Australian wildflowers (2nd edition). Part IIIB.
- Blackall, W. E. and Grieve, B. J. (1982) How to know Western Australian wildflowers (2nd edition). Part IV.
- Blackall, W. E. and Grieve, B. J. (1988) How to know Western Australian wildflowers (2nd edition). Part I.
- Grieve, B. J. (1998) How to know Western Australian wildflowers (2nd edition). Part II.

=== Other ===
- Graham, L. (1986) Index to "How to know W.A. wildflowers", volumes 1-4 and supplement. Typescript held at Battye Library.

== See also ==
- The Western Australian Flora - A Descriptive Catalogue
