= Low Rainfall Zone =

The Low Rainfall Zone (LRZ) is one of three biogeographic zones into which south west Western Australia is divided, the others being the High Rainfall Zone and the Transitional Rainfall Zone. The LRZ is considered marginal to the south west, and extends throughout much of Australia.

The Zones were first defined by Stephen Hopper in his 1979 paper Biogeographical aspects of speciation in the southwest Australian flora. Initially, they were defined in terms of rainfall, with the LRZ being that part of the South West with annual rainfall of less than 300 millimetres (12 in). As the LRZ was marginal to his study area, Hopper did not give a clear demarcation of the zone, merely stating that it

"occupies much of central Australia and is marginal to the area under review, extends along the western coast northerwards of Shark Bay to the tropics and along the south coast from Israelite Bay eastward across the low open shrubland of the Nullarbor Plain to temperate South Australia."
