= Brian Grieve =

Australian botanist (1907–1997)

Professor Brian John Grieve (15 August 1907 – 5 September 1997) was an Australian botanist best known for his multi-volume book series How to know Western Australian wildflowers.

Born in Allans Flat, Victoria, he was educated at Williamstown High School, then matriculated to the University of Melbourne. He graduated with First Class Honours in Botany in 1929, and the following year was awarded an M.Sc. He then won an 1851 Exhibition Scholarship that enabled him to undertake Doctoral studies at the University of London.

Grieve returned to Victoria in 1931, taking up a lecturing position at the University of Melbourne. He remained there until 1947, except for a period in 1938 and 1939 when he studied mycology at the University of Cambridge, and a brief time serving in the Royal Australian Naval Reserve early in World War II. During World War II his university research included an investigation into fungal contamination of field glasses in New Guinea.

In 1947, Grieve moved to Western Australia to become head of the University of Western Australia's Botany Department. In 1957 he became the Department's Foundation Professor. His research interests were broad, taking in general botany, anatomy, physiology, genetics, biosystematics, ecology, mycology and systematics. Later, he began to specialise in the physiology of Australia's native plants, especially their water relationships.

Grieve was a long-time member of the Royal Society of Western Australia, joining in 1948, and twice serving as President. He was made an Honorary Life Member in 1975, and was awarded the Society's Medal in 1979. He also served on the Kings Park Board from 1959 to 1978.

In the public's eye, he is best known for his contributions to the How to Know Western Australian Wildflowers project, a series of books on systematic identification of the flora of Western Australia begun by William Blackall, and continued by Grieve after Blackall's death in 1941. Despite working on the project for over fifty years, he never published a formal taxonomic paper, and so does not have a formal botanical author abbreviation.
