= John Stanley Beard =

British ecologist

John Stanley Beard (15 February 1916 – 17 February 2011) was a British-born forester and ecologist who resided in Australia. Beard studied at the University of Oxford where he completed his doctoral thesis on tropical forestry.

While working with the Forestry Division in Trinidad and Tobago during the 1940s, Beard developed a system of forest classification for Tropical America and described the forests of Trinidad, Tobago, and the Lesser Antilles; these descriptions remain standard references on the topics.

After leaving Trinidad, Beard moved to South Africa and then to Australia, where he produced an extensive series of vegetation maps covering much of the country.

His extensive surveys of Western Australia set standards for understanding regional floristic zones and biogeographical areas for the whole state. He was the main author of the 1964–1981 explanatory notes to the mapping project of the Vegetation Survey of Western Australia, which involved travelling some 150,000 kilometres (93,000 mi). He was also foundation director of the Kings Park and Botanic Garden between 1961 and 1970. He was subsequently director of the Royal Botanic Gardens, Sydney (1970–72) before retiring to Perth. During his directorship, many of Western Australia’s unique native plants were brought into cultivation for the first time. Beard edited the Descriptive Catalogue of Western Australian Plants (1965), which was published by the Society for Growing Australian Plants, to promote understanding of the horticultural requirements of Western Australia’s native plants.

In his retirement, he produced popular accounts of his vegetation studies in Plant Life of Western Australia (1990), and of his taxonomic and horticultural studies of Protea spp. in Proteas of Tropical Africa (1992).

Beard was appointed a Member of the Order of Australia (AM) in the 2003 Queen's Birthday Honours. He died in February 2011 at the age of 95.

== See also ==
- Interim Biogeographic Regionalisation for Australia
- Ecoregions in Australia

== General references ==
- Beard, J.S. 1990. Checklist of the coastal flora of the South-West Botanical Province, Western Australia. Kingia, Vol. 1, no. 3 (1990), p. 255-281

== Interview ==
- Interview with Alice Smith in 1986 - Held in Battye Library 3rd Floor Oral History OH1735 A/r 2 sound cassettes.with Transcript (typescript, 22 p.) Director of Kings Park. Talks about establishment of and highlights of his time there 1961-1970. Includes personal background. https://web.archive.org/web/20141129033601/http://henrietta.liswa.wa.gov.au/record=b1794327~S2 .
