= Fred Lullfitz =

Australian botanist and horticulturist (1914 - 1983)

Frederick Conrad James Lullfitz (22 January 1914 – 1983) was a Western Australian botanist and horticulturist.

Born in Perth, Western Australia, in 1914, he studied botany at the University of Western Australia, and established the Yilgarnia Wildflower Nursey in 1958, one of the first wildflower nurseries in Western Australia. During his long and varied career, he spent five years as a plant and seed collector for the Kings Park and Botanic Garden, and spent many years studying and advising on the flora of the north-west. At that point, a botanical garden of Western Australia's native plants was being developed, and Lullfitz travelled across much of the state in search of seed and plant specimens for this new native section of the botanic garden.

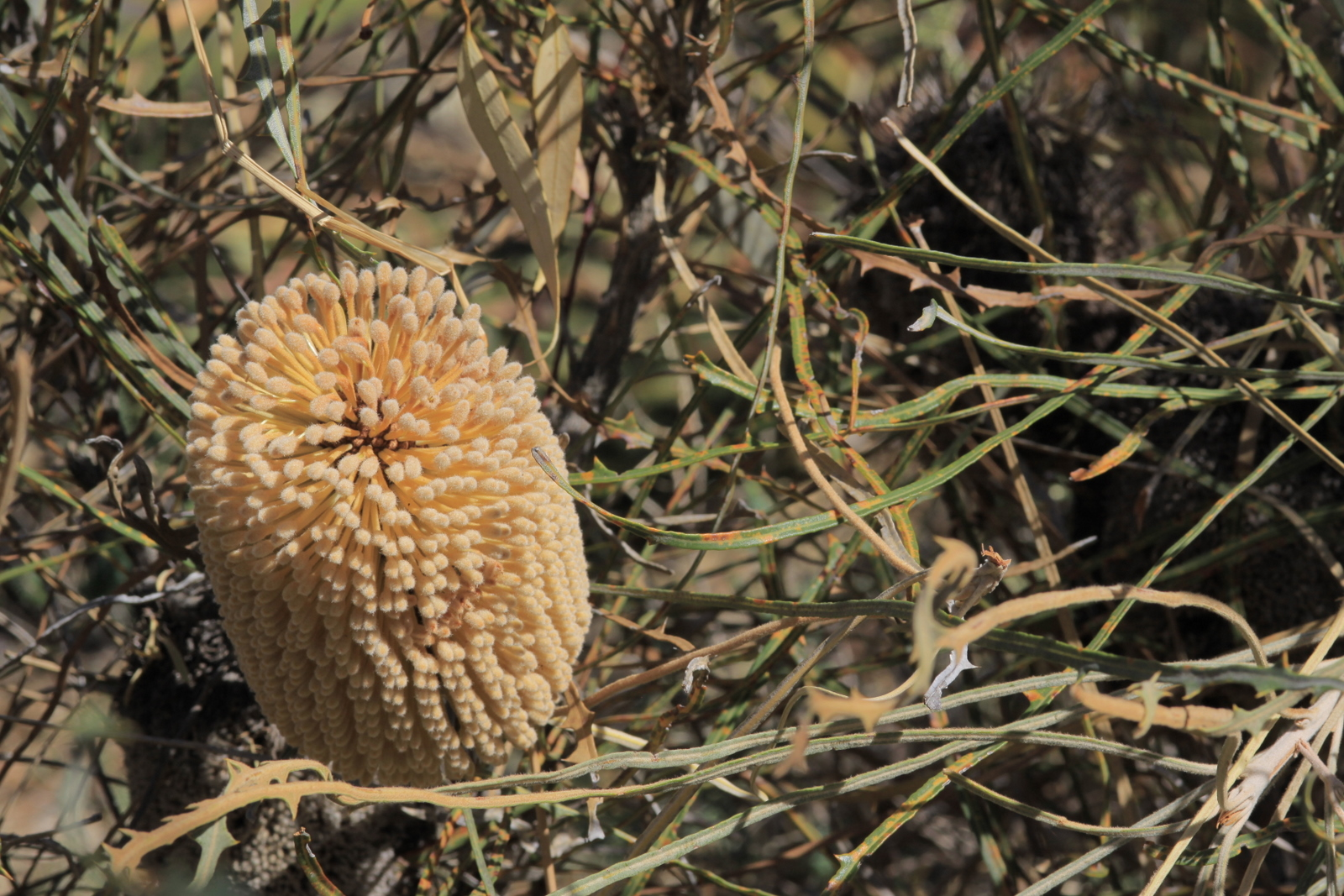
Banksia lullfitzii, named after Lullfitz

In 1967, Lullfitz was appointed as North West Tree Advisor in the town of Broome, where approximately 50,000 plants were being produced per annum at the nursery and sent all over the north-west of Australia, free of charge by MacRobertson Miller Airlines. Lullfitz became involved in horticultural crops such as mango and pawpaw, which resulted in Broome becoming a regional centre for these crops and where new species and varieties were tested for the Commonwealth Scientific and Industrial Research Organisation (CSIRO).

He was a lifelong member of the West Australian Wildflower Society.

During their time in Broome, Lullfitz and family acquired 40 acres of bushland in a land release behind the sand dunes at Cable Beach. The road serving the area is now called Lullfitz Drive. Another section of Lullfitz Drive was renamed Sanctuary Road in 2000 in recognition of Lord Alistair McAlpine's Pearl Coast Zoological Gardens which was situated on it and had the aim of giving sanctuary to endangered species.

In 1978, Lullfitz suffered a stroke and retired to Perth where he lived until his death in 1983, aged 69. Lullfitz was later awarded an Imperial Service Medal for his contribution to horticulture in the north west of Western Australia. As of 2001, his nephew, George Lullfitz, owned two nurseries in the Perth suburbs of Wanneroo and Muchea.

== Scientific contributions ==
Among Lullfitz's scientific contributions were his collection of the type specimen of Acacia anaticeps. Banksia lullfitzii was also named in his honour.

== Sources ==
- Shaw, Carol (2001). The History of Broome's Street Names. Broome: Pindan Printing. ISBN 0-646-40660-4.
