= William Blackall =

Australian botanist and doctor (1876–1941)

William E. Blackall (1876–1941) was a Western Australia medical doctor who made a substantial contribution to that state's botany.

Born in Folkestone, Kent, England, he emigrated to Perth in 1905. His occupation was in medicine, but he is now best known for his amateur botany. He compiled a personal herbarium of around 5,000 specimens, and was the collector of the type specimen from which Acacia daviesioides was published. He also began production of an illustrated key to the flora of Western Australia in the 1920s, but died before it was complete.

On his death in Perth in 1941, his herbarium was deposited at the Western Australian Museum, and eventually ended up at the Western Australian Herbarium. His manuscript was neglected until 1947, when his family asked the University of Western Australia to complete it. This work was taken up by Professor Brian Grieve, and resulted in the well-known series How to know Western Australian wildflowers.
