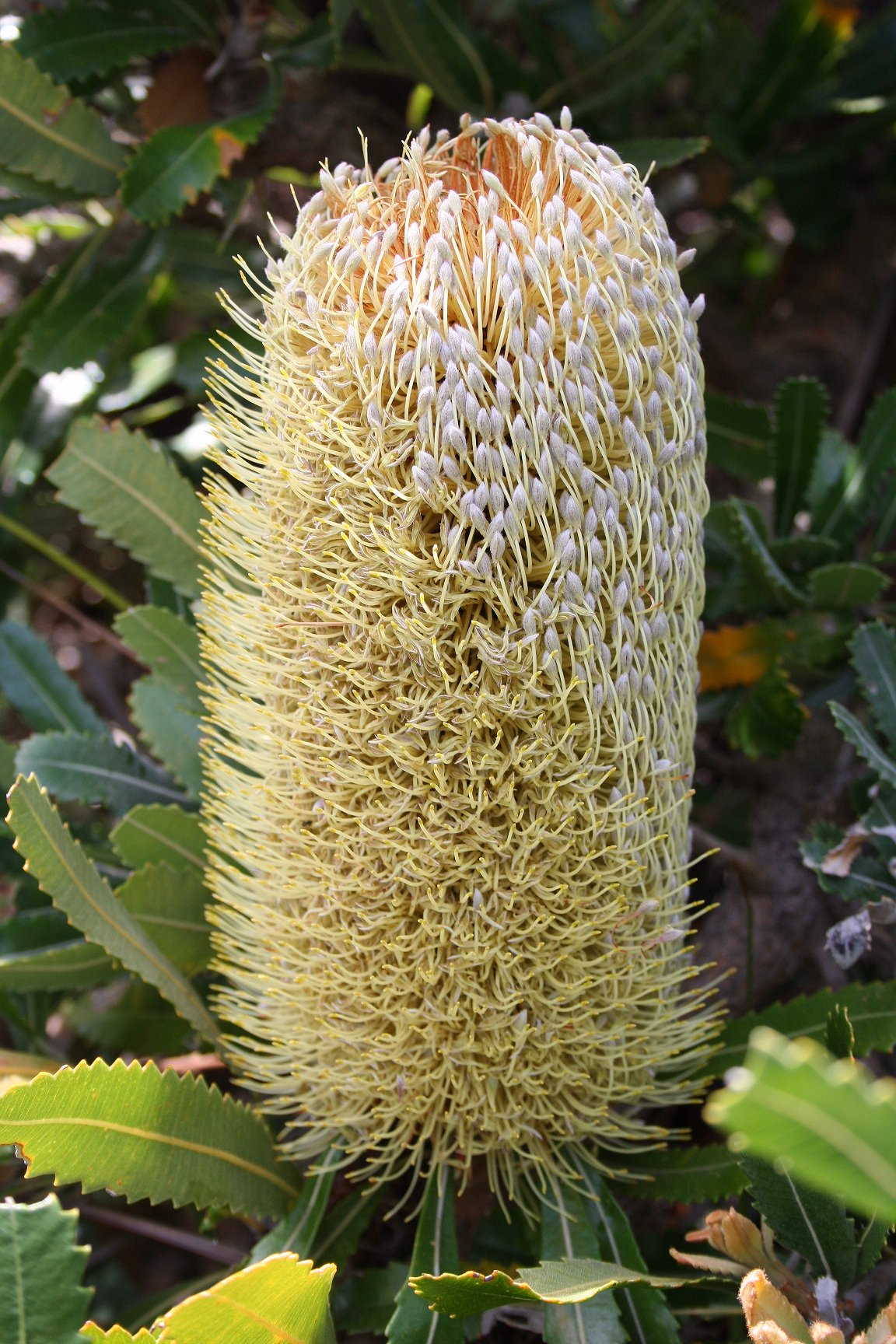
- Banksia serrata (saw banksia), the type species of Banksia

Scientific classification
- Kingdom: Plantae
- Clade: Tracheophytes
- Clade: Angiosperms
- Clade: Eudicots
- Order: Proteales
- Family: Proteaceae
- Genus: Banksia
- Subgenus: Banksia subg. Banksia
- Section: Banksia sect. Banksia
- Series: Banksia ser. Banksia
- Subseries: Banksia subser. Banksia; K.R.Thiele

= Banksia subser. Banksia =

Subseries of plant found in Australia

Banksia subser. Banksia is a valid botanic name for a subseries of Banksia. It was first used by Kevin Thiele in 1996, although as an autonym it is not considered to have been published per se. It was discarded by Alex George in 1999.

== Cladistics ==
The name came about after a cladistic analysis of Banksia by Thiele and Pauline Ladiges yielded a phylogeny somewhat at odds with the accepted taxonomic arrangement, the 1981 arrangement of George. Thiele and Ladiges' cladogram included a clade consisting of the members of B. ser. Banksia sensu George, together with the four members of George's B. ser. Crocinae. This clade divided into two subclades:

- - B. ornata
  - B. serrata
  - B. aemula
- - B. candolleana
  - - B. sceptrum
    - - - B. baxteri
        - B. speciosa
      - - B. menziesii
        - - B. burdettii
          - - B. victoriae
            - - B. hookeriana
              - B. prionotes

== Taxonomy ==
Thiele and Ladiges accepted this clade as the basis for their B. ser. Banksia, dividing it into two subseries in accordance with their cladogram. B. ornata (desert banksia), B. serrata (saw banksia) and B. aemula (wallum banksia) were placed in B. subser. Banksia, and all other species were placed in B. subser. Cratistylis. No formal definition of B. subser. Banksia was given, but as an autonym its type species is necessarily that of the genus, B. serrata. Its three species are all native to the east coast of Australia.

The placement and circumscription of B. subser. Banksia in Thiele and Ladiges' arrangement may be summarised as follows:

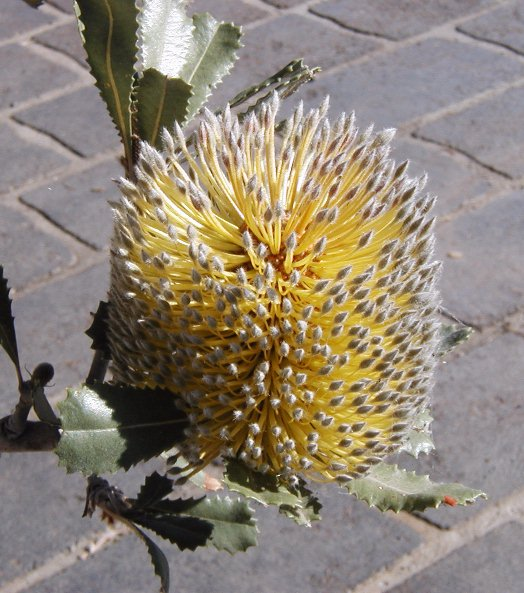
B. ornata (desert banksia)

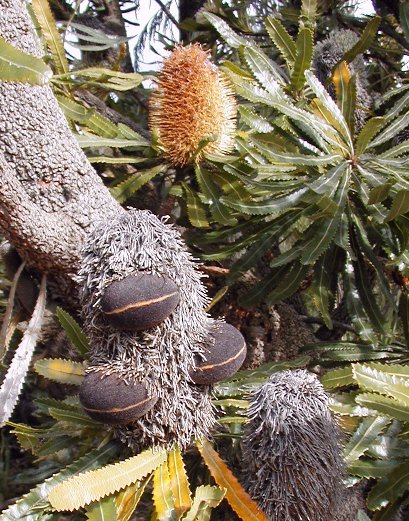
B. aemula (wallum banksia)

Banksia

B. subg. Isostylis (3 species)
B. elegans (incertae sedis)
B. subg. Banksia

B. ser. Tetragonae (4 species)
B. ser. Lindleyanae (1 species)
B. ser. Banksia

B. subser. Banksia

B. ornata
B. serrata
B. aemula

B. subser. Cratistylis

B. candolleana
B. sceptrum
B. baxteri
B. speciosa
B. menziesii
B. burdettii
B. victoriae
B. hookeriana
B. prionotes

B. baueri (incertae sedis)
B. lullfitzii (incertae sedis)
B. attenuata (incertae sedis)
B. ashbyi (incertae sedis)
B. coccinea (incertae sedis)
B. ser. Prostratae (8 species)
B. ser. Cyrtostylis (4 species)
B. ser. Ochraceae (4 species)
B. ser. Grandes (2 species)
B. ser. Salicinae (2 subseries, 11 species, 4 subspecies)
B. ser. Spicigerae (3 subseries, 7 species, 6 varieties)
B. ser. Quercinae (2 species)
B. ser. Dryandroides (1 species)
B. ser. Abietinae (4 subspecies, 14 species, 8 subspecies)

Thiele and Ladiges' arrangement remained current only until 1999, when George's treatment of the genus for the Flora of Australia series of monographs was published. This was essentially a revision of George's 1981 arrangement, which took into account some of Thiele and Ladiges' data, but rejected their overall arrangement, including B. subser. Banksia.

== Recent developments ==
Since 1998, Austin Mast has been publishing results of ongoing cladistic analyses of DNA sequence data for the subtribe Banksiinae. His analyses suggest a phylogeny that is rather different from previous taxonomic arrangements. Although B. subser. Banksia is monophyletic, it is only distantly related to the other taxa in B. ser. Banksia, being most closely related to B. ser. Ochraceae and B. ser. Prostratae.

Early in 2007 Mast and Thiele initiated a rearrangement of Banksia by transferring Dryandra into it, and publishing B. subg. Spathulatae for the species having spoon-shaped cotyledons. All members of subseries Banksia fall within Mast and Thiele's B. subg. Banksia, but no further details have been published. Mast and Thiele have foreshadowed publishing a full arrangement once DNA sampling of Dryandra is complete.
