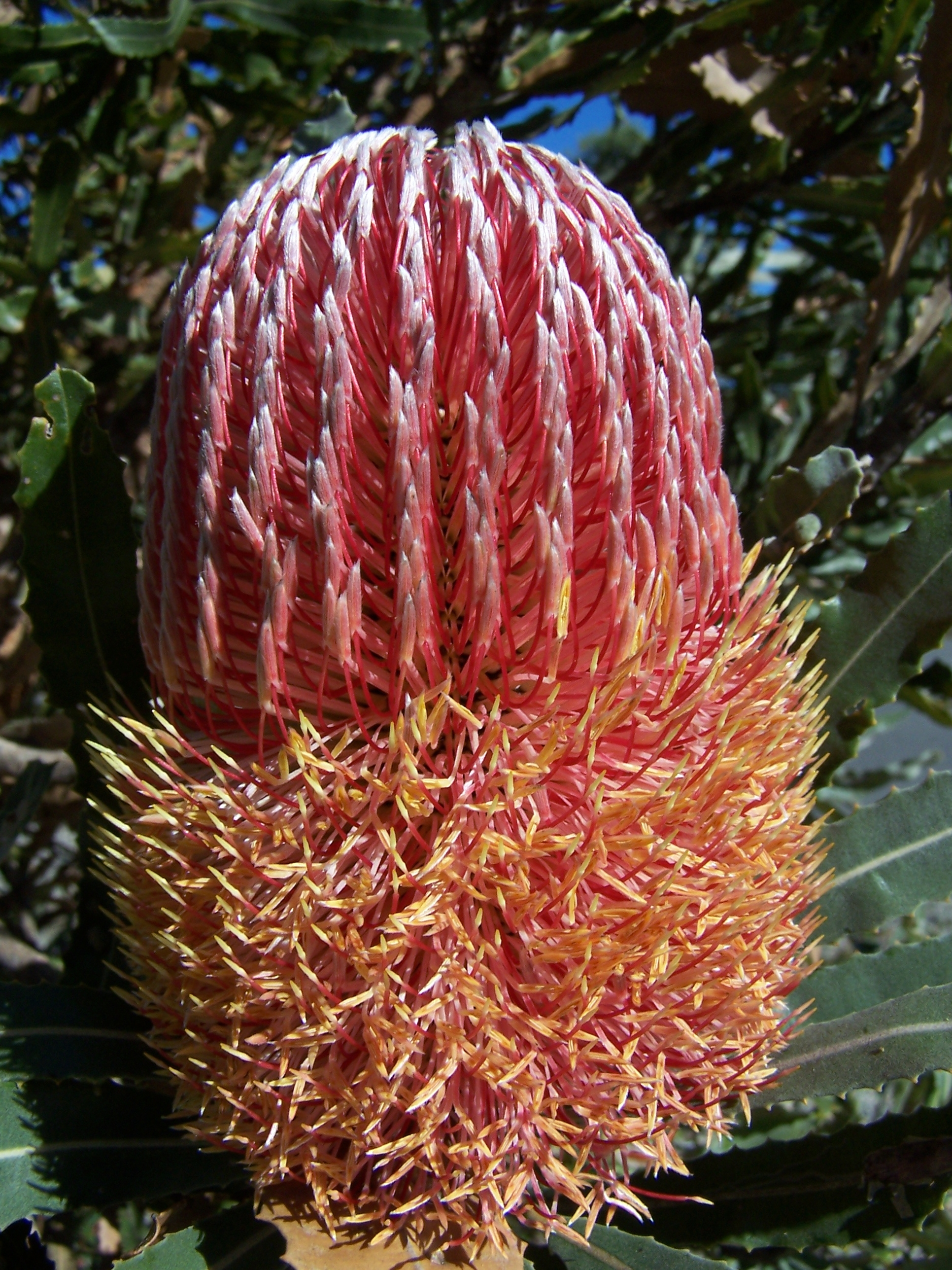
- Banksia menziesii (firewood banksia), the type species of B. subser. Cratistylis

Scientific classification
- Kingdom: Plantae
- Clade: Tracheophytes
- Clade: Angiosperms
- Clade: Eudicots
- Order: Proteales
- Family: Proteaceae
- Genus: Banksia
- Subgenus: Banksia subg. Banksia
- Section: Banksia sect. Banksia
- Series: Banksia ser. Banksia
- Subseries: Banksia subser. Cratistylis; K.R.Thiele

Species
- See text

= Banksia subser. Cratistylis =

Subseries of plants found in Australia

Banksia subser. Cratistylis is a valid botanic name for a subseries of Banksia. It was first published by Kevin Thiele in 1996 but discarded by Alex George in 1999.

== Cladistics ==
The name came about after a cladistic analysis of Banksia by Thiele and Pauline Ladiges yielded a phylogeny somewhat at odds with the accepted taxonomic arrangement, the 1981 arrangement of George. Thiele and Ladiges' cladogram included a clade consisting of the members of B. ser. Banksia sensu George, together with the four members of George's B. ser. Crocinae. This clade divided into two subclades:

- - B. ornata
  - B. serrata
  - B. aemula
- - B. candolleana
  - - B. sceptrum
    - - - B. baxteri
        - B. speciosa
      - - B. menziesii
        - - B. burdettii
          - - B. victoriae
            - - B. hookeriana
              - B. prionotes

== Taxonomy ==
Thiele and Ladiges accepted this clade as the basis for their B. ser. Banksia, discarding George's B. ser. Crocinae. They divided the series into two subseries in accordance with their cladogram, with B. ornata (desert banksia), B. serrata (saw banksia) and B. aemula (wallum banksia) placed in B. subser. Banksia, and the remaining nine species placed in B. subser. Cratistylis. The latter subseries was formally defined as containing those species with "stout, usually monotonically curved, smooth styles, and seed bodies usually with spine-like or plate-like processes on their inner faces", and given as type species B. menziesii (firewood banksia). The subseries name comes from the Greek kratys ("strong, sturdy") and stylos ("style"), in reference to the stout style and pollen-presenter of the species contained therein.

The placement and circumscription of B. subser. Cratistylis in Thiele and Ladiges' arrangement may be summarised as follows:

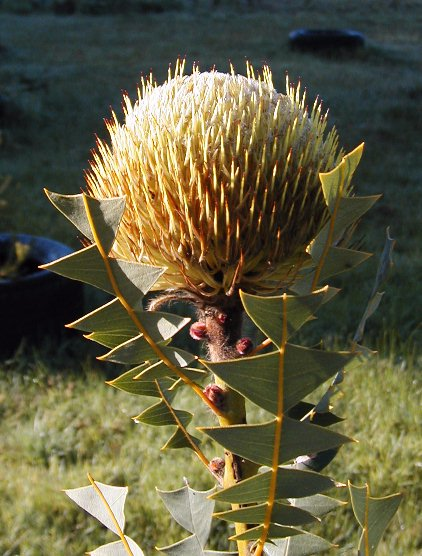
B. baxteri (Baxter's banksia)

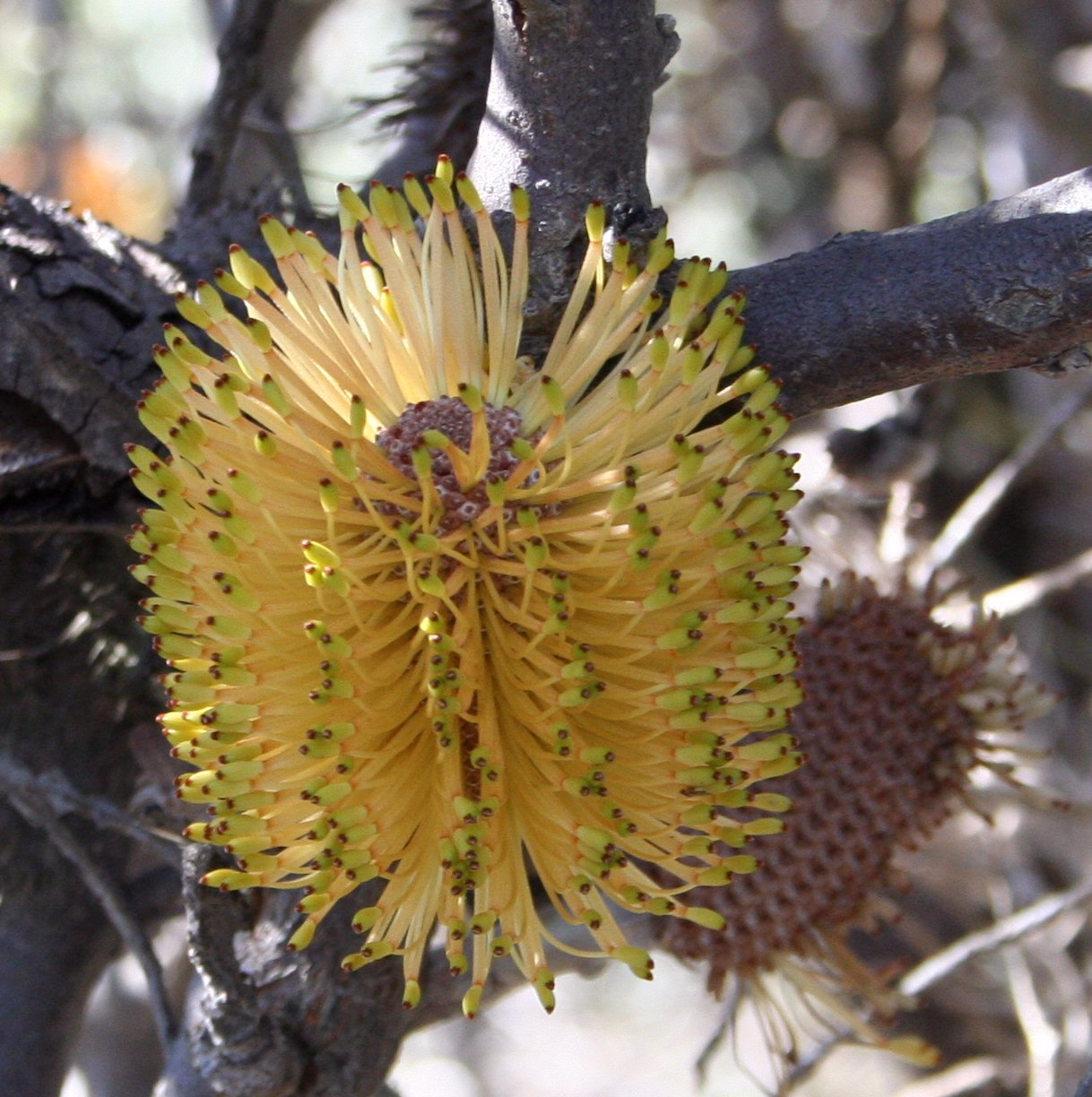
B. candolleana (propeller banksia)

Banksia

B. subg. Isostylis (3 species)
B. elegans (incertae sedis)
B. subg. Banksia

B. ser. Tetragonae (4 species)
B. ser. Lindleyanae (1 species)
B. ser. Banksia

B. subser. Banksia

B. ornata
B. serrata
B. aemula

B. subser. Cratistylis

B. candolleana
B. sceptrum
B. baxteri
B. speciosa
B. menziesii
B. burdettii
B. victoriae
B. hookeriana
B. prionotes

B. baueri (incertae sedis)
B. lullfitzii (incertae sedis)
B. attenuata (incertae sedis)
B. ashbyi (incertae sedis)
B. coccinea (incertae sedis)
B. ser. Prostratae (8 species)
B. ser. Cyrtostylis (4 species)
B. ser. Ochraceae (4 species)
B. ser. Grandes (2 species)
B. ser. Salicinae (2 subseries, 11 species, 4 subspecies)
B. ser. Spicigerae (3 subseries, 7 species, 6 varieties)
B. ser. Quercinae (2 species)
B. ser. Dryandroides (1 species)
B. ser. Abietinae (4 subspecies, 14 species, 8 subspecies)

Thiele and Ladiges' arrangement remained current only until 1999, when George's treatment of the genus for the Flora of Australia series of monographs was published. This was essentially a revision of George's 1981 arrangement, which took into account some of Thiele and Ladiges' data, but rejected their overall arrangement, including B. subser. Cratistylis.

== Recent developments ==
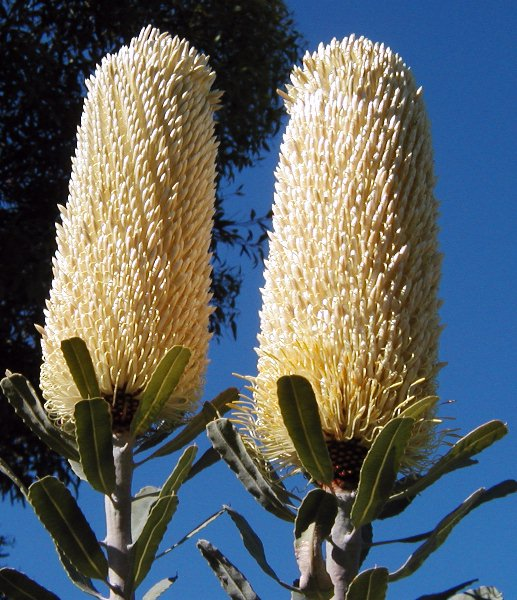
B. sceptrum (sceptre banksia)

Since 1998, Austin Mast has been publishing results of ongoing cladistic analyses of DNA sequence data for the subtribe Banksiinae. His analyses suggest a phylogeny that is rather different from previous taxonomic arrangements. B. subser. Cratistylis appears to be polyphyletic: B. baxteri (Baxter's banksia) and B. speciosa (showy banksia) form a clade alongside B. coccinea (scarlet banksia), and the remaining species form a clade with B. ashbyi (Ashby's banksia) and B. lindleyana (porcupine banksia).

Early in 2007 Mast and Thiele initiated a rearrangement of Banksia by transferring Dryandra into it, and publishing B. subg. Spathulatae for the species having spoon-shaped cotyledons. All members of subseries Banksia fall within Mast and Thiele's B. subg. Banksia, but no further details have been published. Mast and Thiele have foreshadowed publishing a full arrangement once DNA sampling of Dryandra is complete.
