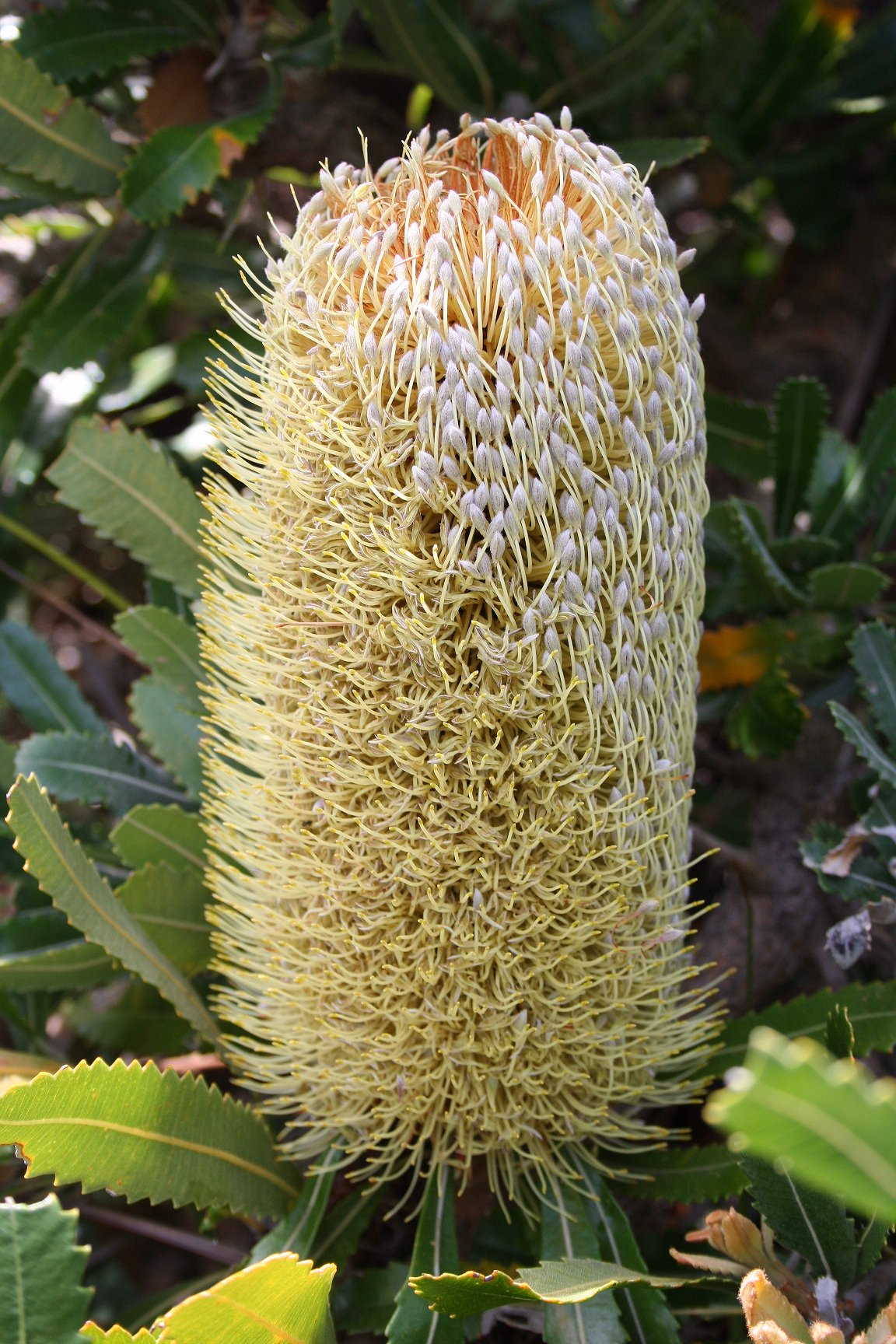
- Banksia serrata (saw banksia), the type species of Banksia

Scientific classification
- Kingdom: Plantae
- Clade: Tracheophytes
- Clade: Angiosperms
- Clade: Eudicots
- Order: Proteales
- Family: Proteaceae
- Genus: Banksia
- Subgenus: Banksia subg. Banksia
- Section: Banksia sect. Banksia
- Series: Banksia ser. Banksia

Synonyms
- B. sect. Orthostylis Benth. B. ser. Orthostylis (Benth.) A.S.George

= Banksia ser. Banksia =

Series of plants found in Australia

Banksia ser. Banksia is a valid botanic name for a series of Banksia. As an autonym, it necessarily contains the type species of Banksia, B. serrata (saw banksia). Within this constraint, however, there have been various circumscriptions.

== According to Bentham ==
Banksia ser. Banksia originated in 1870 as Banksia sect. Orthostylis. Published by George Bentham in 1870, B. sect. Orthostylis consisted of those Banksia species with flat leaves with serrated margins, and rigid, erect styles that "give the cones after the flowers have opened a different aspect". The placement and circumscription of B. sect. Orthostylis in Bentham's arrangement can be summarised as follows:

Banksia

B. sect. Oncostylis (13 species)
B. sect. Cyrtostylis (10 species)
B. sect. Eubanksia (3 species)
B. sect. Orthostylis

B. latifolia (now B. robur)
B. serrata
B. ornata
B. coccinea
B. sceptrum
B. menziesii
B. lævigata
B. hookeriana
B. prionotes
B. victoriæ
B. speciosa
B. baxteri
B. marcescens (now B. praemorsa)
B. lemanniana
B. caleyi
B. lindleyana
B. elegans
B. candolleana

B. sect. Isostylis (1 species)

== According to George 1981 ==
In 1981, Alex George published a thorough revision of Banksia in his classic monograph The genus Banksia L.f. (Proteaceae). He retained the name Orthostylis, but demoted it to series rank, placing it in B. subg. Banksia because of its elongate "flower spike", and in B. sect. Banksia, because it has straight styles after anthesis. The series was given a rather stricter circumscription to that of Bentham: it was defined as containing only those species with a hairy pistil that is prominently curved before anthesis. The result was a series of just eight species, all of which had been included in Bentham's B. sect. Orthostylis. The other eleven members of Bentham's Orthostylis were moved into other sections and series.

The placement and circumscription of B. ser. Orthostylis in George's 1981 arrangement may be summarised as follows:

Banksia

B. subg. Banksia

B. sect. Banksia

B. ser. Salicinae (9 species)
B. ser. Grandes (2 species)
B. ser. Quercinae (3 species)
B. ser. Orthostylis

B. serrata
B. aemula
B. ornata
B. menziesii
B. speciosa
B. baxteri
B. candolleana
B. sceptrum

B. ser. Crocinae (4 species)
B. ser. Cyrtostylis (12 species)
B. ser. Prostratae (6 species)
B. ser. Tetragonae (3 species)
B. ser. Coccineae (1 species)

B. sect. Oncostylis (3 series, 21 species)

B. subg. Isostylis (2 species)

The placement of B. sceptrum (Sceptre Banksia) in this series was initially tentative, as George felt that "in some respects it also shows a relationship to the series Cyrtostylis". B. aemula (wallum banksia) was also flagged as anomalous in having a conical pollen-presenter, and B. pilostylis (marsh banksia) was noted as the only species outside the series that has a hairy pistil. Overall, George accepted that the resultant series was "somewhat heterogeneous", but argued that the species had enough in common to warrant grouping them together. Since species of B. ser. Orthostylis occur in both western and eastern Australia, George suggested that it had evolved early, and was widespread across southern Australia before aridification and marine incursion established the Nullarbor Plain as a barrier to genetic exchange.

George's 1981 publication of B. ser. Orthostylis was illegal. Since the series contained B. serrata (saw banksia), the type species of Banksia, it was required under the International Code of Botanical Nomenclature to be given the autonym Banksia L.f. ser. Banksia . This has been recognised and corrected in later publications.

== According to Thiele and Ladiges ==
In 1996, Kevin Thiele and Pauline Ladiges undertook a cladistic analysis of morphological characters of Banksia, which yielded a phylogeny somewhat at odds with George's taxonomic arrangement. Their cladogram included a clade consisting of the members of B. ser. Banksia sensu George, together with the four members of George's B. ser. Crocinae:

- - B. ornata
  - B. serrata
  - B. aemula
- - B. candolleana
  - - B. sceptrum
    - - - B. baxteri
        - B. speciosa
      - - B. menziesii
        - - B. burdettii
          - - B. victoriae
            - - B. hookeriana
              - B. prionotes

On the basis of this clade, Thiele and Ladiges abandoned B. ser. Crocinae, transferring its four taxa into B. ser. Banksia. They then divided the series into two subseries, placing B. ornata (desert banksia), B. serrata and B. aemula in B. subser. Banksia, and all other species in B. subser. Cratistylis.

The placement and circumscription of B. ser. Banksia in Thiele and Ladiges' arrangement may be summarised as follows:

Banksia

B. subg. Isostylis (3 species)
B. elegans (incertae sedis)
B. subg. Banksia

B. ser. Tetragonae (4 species)
B. ser. Lindleyanae (1 species)
B. ser. Banksia

B. subser. Banksia

B. ornata
B. serrata
B. aemula

B. subser. Cratistylis

B. candolleana
B. sceptrum
B. baxteri
B. speciosa
B. menziesii
B. burdettii
B. victoriae
B. hookeriana
B. prionotes

B. baueri (incertae sedis)
B. lullfitzii (incertae sedis)
B. attenuata (incertae sedis)
B. ashbyi (incertae sedis)
B. coccinea (incertae sedis)
B. ser. Prostratae (8 species)
B. ser. Cyrtostylis (4 species)
B. ser. Ochraceae (4 species)
B. ser. Grandes (2 species)
B. ser. Salicinae (2 subseries, 11 species, 4 subspecies)
B. ser. Spicigerae (3 subseries, 7 species, 6 varieties)
B. ser. Quercinae (2 species)
B. ser. Dryandroides (1 species)
B. ser. Abietinae (4 subseries, 14 species, 8 subspecies)

== According to George 1999 ==
Thiele and Ladiges' arrangement remained current only until 1999, when George's treatment of the genus for the Flora of Australia series of monographs was published. This was essentially a revision of George's 1981 arrangement, which took into account some of Thiele and Ladiges' data, but rejected their overall arrangement. With respect to B. ser. Banksia, George's 1999 arrangement was identical to his 1981 arrangement, except that B. baxteri (Baxter's Banksia) and B. menziesii (Menzies Banksia) were exchanged in phyletic order.

== Recent developments ==
Since 1998, Austin Mast has been publishing results of ongoing cladistic analyses of DNA sequence data for the subtribe Banksiinae. His analyses suggest a phylogeny that is rather different from previous taxonomic arrangements. All previous circumscriptions of B. ser. Banksia appear to be polyphyletic. Bentham's circumscription is widely polyphyletic, and both George's and Thiele and Ladiges' circumscription bring together species that occur in three widely separate clades in Mast's cladogram. Thiele's B. subser. Banksia is monophyletic but is most closely related to B. ser. Ochraceae and B. ser. Prostratae; B. baxteri (Baxter's banksia) and B. speciosa (showy banksia) form a clade alongside B. coccinea (scarlet banksia); and the remaining species in Thiele and Ladiges' circumscription form a third clade with B. ashbyi (Ashby's banksia) and B. lindleyana (porcupine banksia).

Early in 2007 Mast and Thiele initiated a rearrangement of Banksia by transferring Dryandra into it, and publishing B. subg. Spathulatae for the species having spoon-shaped cotyledons; in this way they also redefined the autonym B. subg. Banksia. All members of B. ser. Banksia fall within Mast and Thiele's B. subg. Banksia, but no more detail has been published. Mast and Thiele have foreshadowed publishing a full arrangement once DNA sampling of Dryandra is complete.
