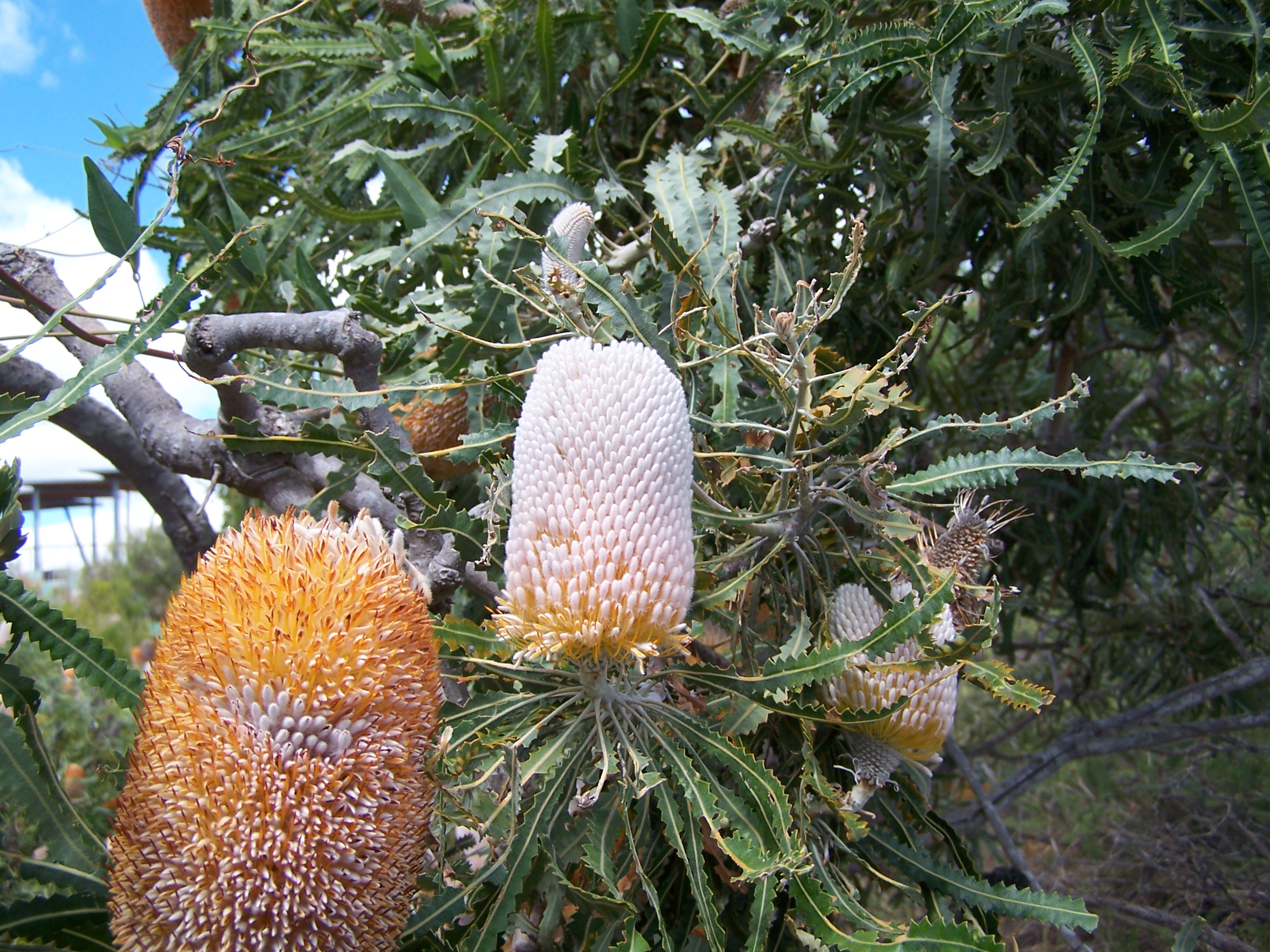
- Banksia prionotes, the type species of B. ser. Crocinae

Scientific classification
- Kingdom: Plantae
- Clade: Tracheophytes
- Clade: Angiosperms
- Clade: Eudicots
- Order: Proteales
- Family: Proteaceae
- Genus: Banksia
- Subgenus: Banksia subg. Banksia
- Section: Banksia sect. Banksia
- Series: Banksia ser. Crocinae; A.S.George

Species
- B. prionotes B. victoriae B. hookeriana B. burdettii

= Banksia ser. Crocinae =

Taxonomic series of Australian plants

Banksia ser. Crocinae is a taxonomic series in the genus Banksia. The series was first published by Alex George in 1981, but discarded by Kevin Thiele and Pauline Ladiges in 1996, and finally reinstated by George in 1999. Recent cladistic analyses suggest that it is monophyletic or nearly so.

== Species ==
It consists of four closely related species, all of which are endemic to Western Australia; namely

Image	Plant	Scientific name	Common name	Distribution
		B. prionotes	Acorn Banksia	Southwest Botanical Province, occurring along the west coast and well inland, and ranging from Shark Bay in the north, to Kojonup and Jerramungup
		B. burdettii	Burdett's Banksia	between Eneabba and Mogumber in Western Australia
		B. hookeriana	Hooker's Banksia	between Arrowsmith and Eneabba
		B. victoriae	Woolly Orange Banksia	between Northampton, Western Australia and Kalbarri

== Systematics ==
=== George 1981 ===
B. ser. Banksia originated in the 1981 arrangement of George, published in his classic monograph The genus Banksia L.f. (Proteaceae). George grouped the four species into a series on the grounds that they are "remarkably similar especially in floral morphology", giving the series the name B. ser. Crocinae from the Latin crocinus ("rich orange"), in reference to the bright orange inflorescences. He also remarked that "the series is probably derived from the Orthostylis, which can in hingsight be read as an admission of paraphyly.

The placement and circumscription of B. ser. Crocinae in George's 1981 arrangement may be summarised as follows:

Banksia

B. subg. Banksia

B. sect. Banksia

B. ser. Salicinae (9 species)
B. ser. Grandes (2 species)
B. ser. Quercinae (3 species)
B. ser. Orthostylis (4 species)
B. ser. Crocinae

B. prionotes
B. victoriae
B. hookerana (now spelled B. hookeriana)
B. burdettii

B. ser. Cyrtostylis (12 species)
B. ser. Prostratae (6 species)
B. ser. Tetragonae (3 species)
B. ser. Coccineae (1 species)

B. sect. Oncostylis (3 series, 21 species)

B. subg. Isostylis (2 species)

=== Thiele and Ladiges 1996 ===
In 1996, Kevin Thiele and Pauline Ladiges undertook a cladistic analysis of morphological characters of Banksia, which yielded a phylogeny somewhat at odds with George's taxonomic arrangement. Their cladogram included a clade consisting of the members of George's B. ser. Banksia, together with the four members of B. ser. Crocinae:

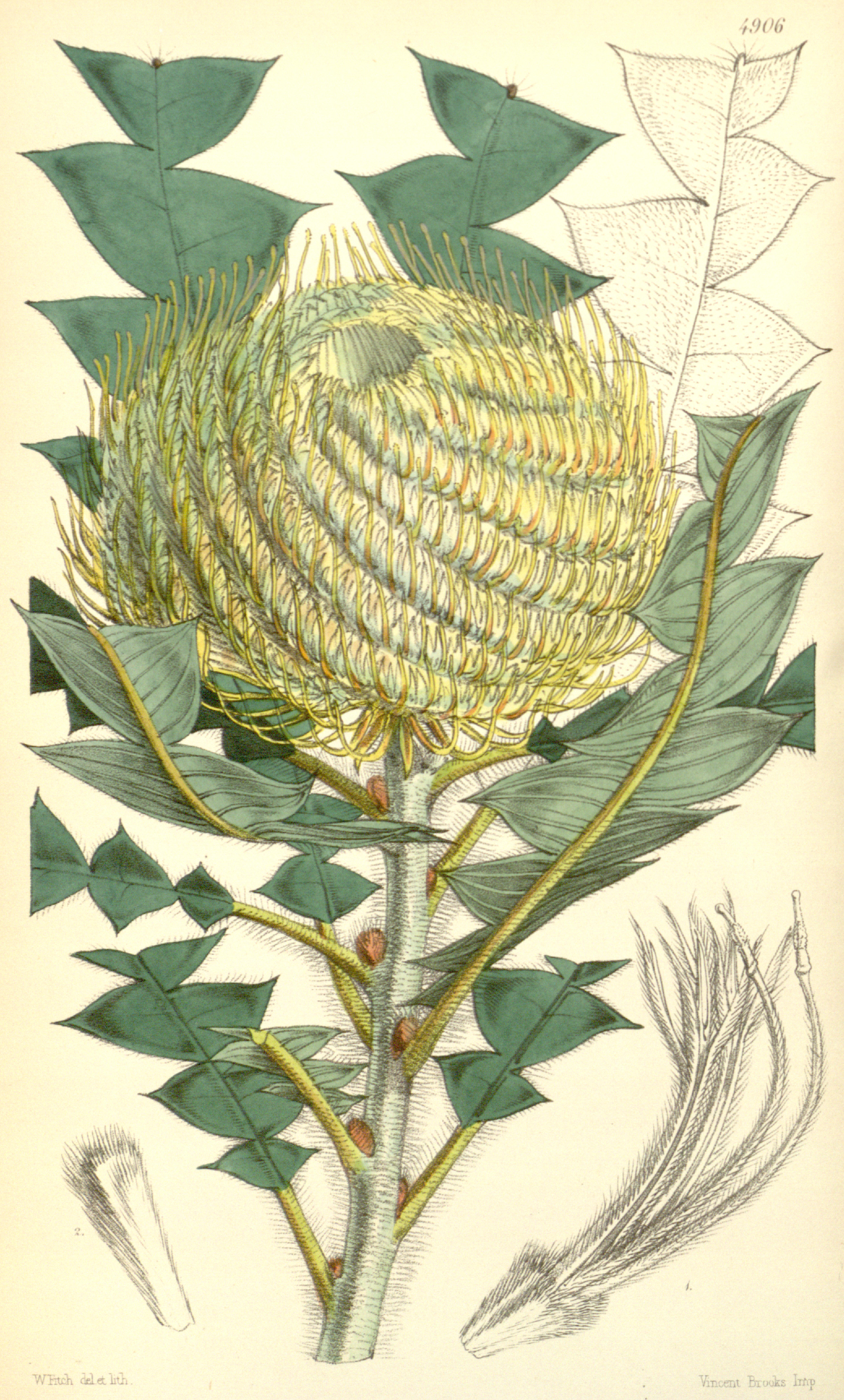
B. victoriae

- - B. ornata
  - B. serrata
  - B. aemula
- - B. candolleana
  - - B. sceptrum
    - - - B. baxteri
        - B. speciosa
      - - B. menziesii
        - - B. burdettii
          - - B. victoriae
            - - B. hookeriana
              - B. prionotes

B. ser. Crocinae was found to be monophyletic, but B. ser. Banksia was paraphyletic with respect to it. To resolve this, Thiele and Ladiges abandoned B. ser. Crocinae, transferring its four taxa into B. ser. Banksia. They then divided B. ser. Banksia, into two subseries, with the species belonging to George's B. ser. Crocinae endind up in B. subser. Cratistylis.

== George 1999 ==
Thiele and Ladiges' arrangement remained current only until 1999, when George's treatment of the genus for the Flora of Australia series of monographs was published. This was essentially a revision of George's 1981 arrangement, which took into account some of Thiele and Ladiges' data, but rejected their overall arrangement. With respect to B. ser. Cyrtostylis, George's 1999 arrangement was identical to his 1981 arrangement, except that B. burdettii and B. victoriae were exchanged in phyletic order.

=== Recent developments ===
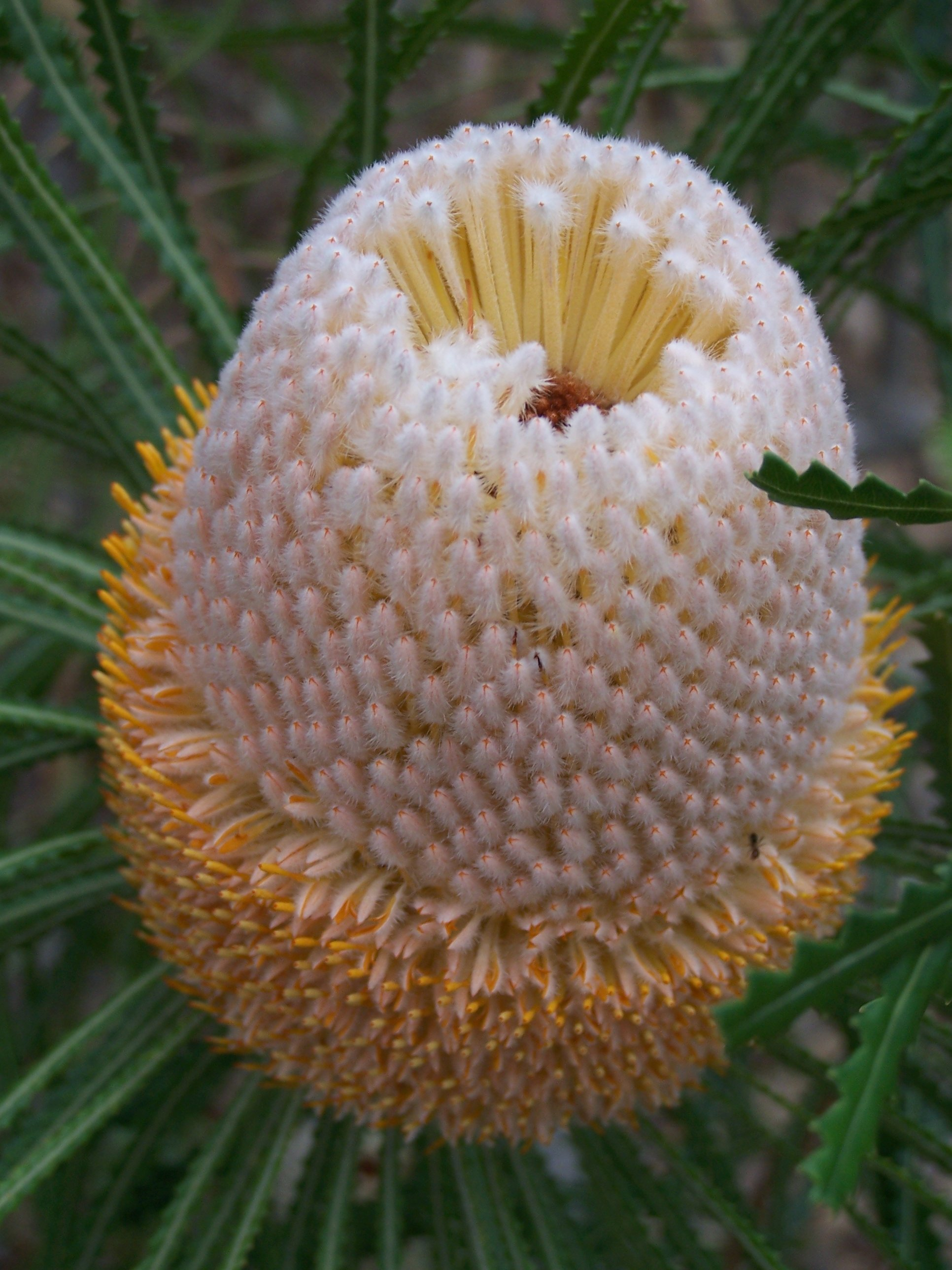
B. hookeriana

Since 1998, Austin Mast has been publishing results of ongoing cladistic analyses of DNA sequence data for the subtribe Banksiinae. His analyses suggest a phylogeny that is rather different to previous taxonomic arrangements. B. ser. Crocinae is monophyletic or nearly so, occurring in a polytomous clade with B. menziesii; this clade is sister to a clade containing B. sceptrum (sceptre banksia) and B. ashbyi (Ashby's banksia), and a clade containing Banksia lindleyana (porcupine banksia):

- - B. menziesii
  - B. burdettii
  - B. victoriae
  - - B. hookeriana
    - B. prionotes
- - B. sceptrum
  - B. ashbyi
- B. lindleyana

Early in 2007 Mast and Thiele initiated a rearrangement of Banksia by transferring Dryandra into it, and publishing B. subg. Spathulatae for the species having spoon-shaped cotyledons; in this way they also redefined the autonym B. subg. Banksia. All members of B. ser. Crocinae fall within Mast and Thiele's B. subg. Banksia, but no further details have been published. Mast and Thiele have foreshadowed publishing a full arrangement once DNA sampling of Dryandra is complete.
