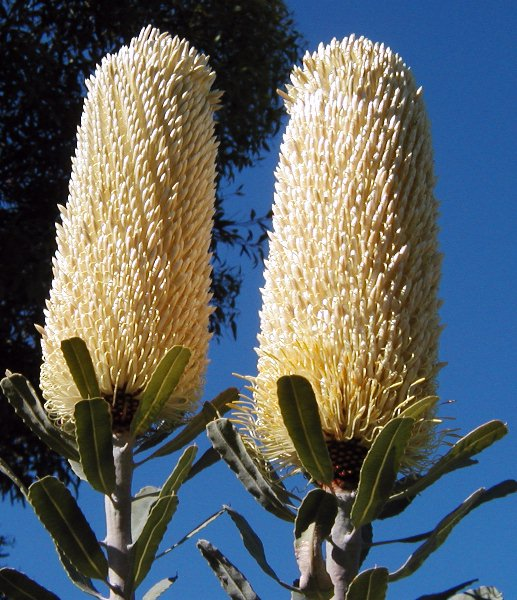

Conservation status
- Least Concern (IUCN 3.1)

Scientific classification
- Kingdom: Plantae
- Clade: Tracheophytes
- Clade: Angiosperms
- Clade: Eudicots
- Order: Proteales
- Family: Proteaceae
- Genus: Banksia
- Subgenus: Banksia subg. Banksia
- Section: Banksia sect. Banksia
- Series: Banksia ser. Banksia
- Species: B. sceptrum

Binomial name
- Banksia sceptrum Meisn.
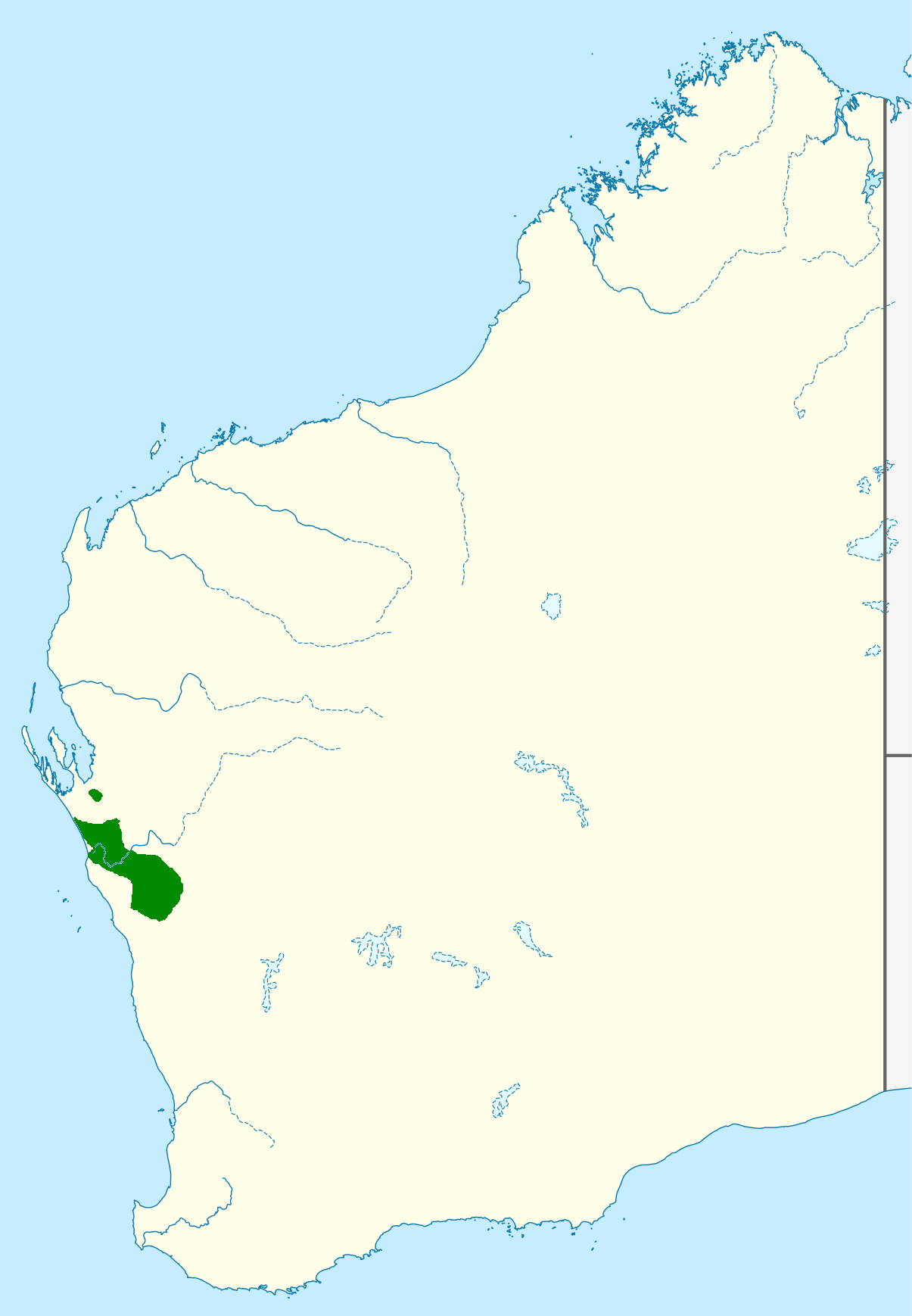
- Range of Banksia sceptrum in green

Synonyms
- Sirmuellera sceptrum (Meisn.) Kuntze

= Banksia sceptrum =

Sceptre banksia

Species of shrub native to Western Australia

Banksia sceptrum, commonly known as the sceptre banksia, is a plant that grows in Western Australia near the central west coast from Geraldton north through Kalbarri to Hamelin Pool. It extends inland almost to Mullewa. First collected and grown by early settler James Drummond in Western Australia, it was described by Swiss botanist Carl Meissner in 1855.

In nature, B. sceptrum grows in deep yellow or pale red sand in tall shrubland, commonly on dunes, being found as a shrub to 5 metres (16 ft) high, though often smaller in exposed areas. It is killed by fire and regenerates by seed, the woody follicles opening with fire. B. sceptrum is one of the most striking yellow-flowered banksias of all. Its tall bright yellow spikes, known as inflorescences, are terminal and well displayed. Flowering is in summer, mainly December and January, though flowers are occasionally seen at other times.

The common name 'sceptrum' is due to the prominent spiky bracts which resemble a ceremonial mace (a sceptre).

== Description ==
Banksia sceptrum generally grows as a shrub up to 2–4 m (6 1/2–13 ft) high, though sometimes it reaches 5 m (16 1/2 ft). It is many-branched and can reach 4 m (13 ft) in diameter. The stocky trunk has smooth or mildly tessellated pale grey bark. New growth has been recorded in spring and autumn, and may possibly occur over the summer. New branchlets are covered in fine greenish-brown fur and become smooth and pale grey after around two years. The leaves are roughly oblong-shaped with truncate or emarginate ends and measure 4–9 cm (1 1/2–3 1/2 in) long and 1–3 cm (3/8–1 1/8 in) wide. They are on 5–8 mm (1/4–3/8 in) long petioles. The flat leaf margins have short blunt teeth. The upper and lower surfaces of the leaf are covered in dense fur, but become smooth with age.

The tall flower spikes, known as inflorescences, arise at the ends of vertical branches over November to January, and can be striking in appearance. They take 6–7 months to develop—longer than other members of the genus. Between 7 and 21 cm (3 and 8 1/2 in) high and 8–10 cm (3 1/4–4 in) wide, they are bright yellow and highly prominent. Flower opening (anthesis) takes place over 1–2 weeks, and proceeds up the flower spike. The ageing flowers turn grey and remain on the spike as the woody oval follicles develop. The infructescence—an old spike bearing follicles—is bulky with a 6–8 cm (2 1/4–3 1/4 in) diameter. There are up to 50 follicles on each spike, each 1.5–2.5 cm (1/2–1 in) long, 0.8–1.8 cm (3/8–3/4 in) high and 1–1.6 cm (1/2–3/4 in) wide. When new they are covered with dense grey fur, which wears off exposed areas.

The obovate (egg-shaped) seed is 3–3.5 cm (1 1/8–1 3/8 in) long and fairly flattened. It is composed of the obovate seed body (containing the embryonic plant), measuring 1.1–1.4 cm (3/8–1/2 in) long by 0.7–0.9 cm (1/4–3/8 in) wide, and a papery wing. One side, termed the outer surface, is brown and slightly wrinkled and the other is brown-black and sparkles slightly. The seeds are separated by a sturdy dark brown seed separator that is roughly the same shape as the seeds with a depression where the seed body sits adjacent to it in the follicle. The first pair of leaves produced by seedlings, known as cotyledons, are obovate and measure 1.4–1.5 cm (1/2–5/8 in) long by 1.2 cm (1/2 in) wide. The upper leaf margin of the wedge is crinkled. The auricle at the base of the cotyledon leaf is pointed and measures 0.2 cm (1/8 in) long.

== Taxonomy ==
Swiss botanist Carl Meissner described Banksia sceptrum in 1855, based on a specimen collected by James Drummond north of the Hutt River sometime during 1850 or 1851. The species name sceptrum "sceptre" refers to the prominent flower spikes. In his 1856 arrangement of the genus, there were 58 described Banksia species. Meissner divided Brown's Banksia verae, which had been renamed Eubanksia by Stephan Endlicher in 1847, into four series based on leaf properties. He placed B. sceptrum in the series Quercinae. George Bentham published a thorough revision of Banksia in his landmark publication Flora Australiensis in 1870. In Bentham's arrangement, the number of recognised Banksia species was reduced from 60 to 46. Bentham defined four sections based on leaf, style and pollen-presenter characters. Banksia sceptrum was placed in section Orthostylis. In his 1891 work Revisio Generum Plantarum, German botanist Otto Kuntze challenged the generic name Banksia L.f., on the grounds that the name Banksia had previously been published in 1775 as Banksia J.R.Forst & G.Forst, referring to the genus now known as Pimelea. Kuntze proposed Sirmuellera as an alternative, republishing B. sceptrum as Sirmuellera sceptrum. The challenge failed, and Banksia L.f. was formally conserved in 1940.

In his 1981 monograph The genus Banksia L.f. (Proteaceae), Australian botanist Alex George placed B. sceptrum in B. subg. Banksia because its inflorescence is a typical Banksia flower spike shape, in B. sect. Banksia because of its straight styles, and in B. ser. Banksia because of its robust inflorescence and hairy pistil that is prominently curved before anthesis. He added that its follicles resembled those of Banksia ornata, while the muricate seed body resembled those of B. speciosa and B. baxteri, though its obovate, crinkled cotyledons suggested an affinity with the series Cyrtostylis.

Kevin Thiele and Pauline Ladiges published a new arrangement for the genus in 1996; their morphological cladistic analysis yielded a cladogram significantly different from George's arrangement. Thiele and Ladiges' arrangement retained B. sceptrum in series Banksia, placing it in B. subser. Cratistylis along with eight other Western Australian species. It was placed as an early offshoot within the group. This arrangement stood until 1999, when George effectively reverted to his 1981 arrangement in his monograph for the Flora of Australia series. B. spectrum's placement within Banksia according to Flora of Australia is as follows:

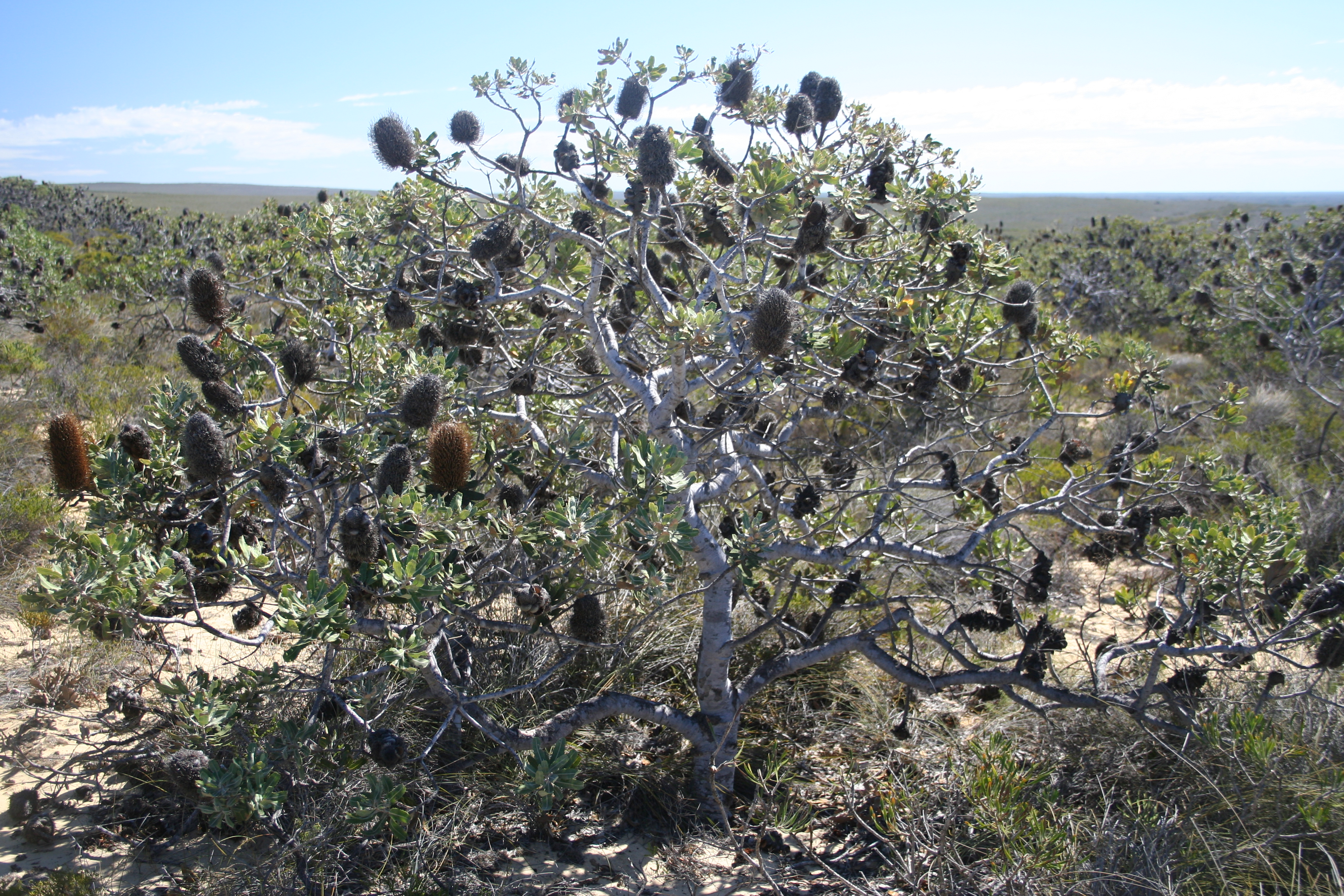
Growing as a gnarled shrub in exposed low shrubland north of its range

Genus Banksia

Subgenus Banksia

Section Banksia

Series Banksia

B. serrata
B. aemula
B. ornata
B. baxteri
B. speciosa
B. menziesii
B. candolleana
B. sceptrum

In 2002, a molecular study by Austin Mast showed Banksia sceptrum and B. ashbyi to be each other's closest relatives, the two lying in a larger group made up of the members of the subseries Cratistylis plus Banksia lindleyana. This was reinforced in a 2013 molecular study by Marcel Cardillo and colleagues using chloroplast DNA and combining it with earlier results.

Mast, Eric Jones and Shawn Havery published the results of their cladistic analyses of DNA sequence data for Banksia in 2005. They inferred a phylogeny greatly different from the accepted taxonomic arrangement, including finding Banksia to be paraphyletic with respect to Dryandra. A new taxonomic arrangement was not published at the time, but early in 2007 Mast and Thiele initiated a rearrangement by transferring Dryandra to Banksia, and publishing B. subg. Spathulatae for the species having spoon-shaped cotyledons; in this way they also redefined the autonym B. subg. Banksia. They foreshadowed publishing a full arrangement once DNA sampling of Dryandra was complete. In the meantime, if Mast and Thiele's nomenclatural changes are taken as an interim arrangement, then B. sceptrum is placed in B. subg. Banksia.

== Distribution and habitat ==
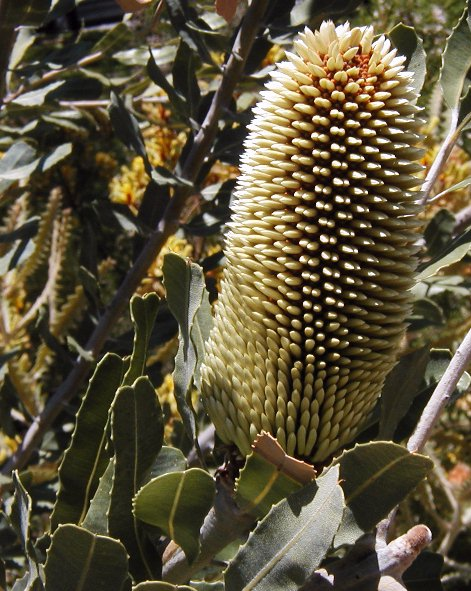
In bud, used in cut flower industry

Banksia sceptrum is found from Hamelin Pool south to around 60 km (37 mi) east of Geraldton and near Mullewa and east to Wandana Nature Reserve. The annual rainfall is 300–400 mm (12–16 in). The soils it grows on are deep yellow or pale red sands, often on dunes. It is also found on flat areas. Found in tall shrubland, it grows in association with B. ashbyi, mallee gums, sandplain cypress (Actinostrobus arenarius) and sandplain woody pear (Xylomelum angustifolium).

== Ecology ==
Like many plants in Australia's southwest, Banksia sceptrum is adapted to an environment in which bushfire events are relatively frequent. Most Banksia species can be placed in one of two broad groups according to their response to fire: reseeders are killed by fire, but fire also triggers the release of their canopy seed bank, thus promoting recruitment of the next generation; resprouters survive fire, resprouting from a lignotuber or, more rarely, epicormic buds protected by thick bark. Banksia sceptrum is a reseeder—killed by bushfire and regenerating by seed. The follicles on the old flower spikes remain closed until burnt by fire, after which they open and release the seed. New plants take three to five years to flower again. If bushfires are too frequent—occurring less than four years apart—they risk eradicating local populations of reseeders.

B. sceptrum has been shown to be highly susceptible to dieback from the soil-borne water mould Phytophthora cinnamomi, like many Western Australian banksias.

An assessment of the potential impact of climate change on this species found that its range is unlikely to contract and may actually grow, depending on how effectively it migrates into newly habitable areas.

== Cultivation ==
B. sceptrum is principally used in the cut flower industry, with the immature spikes being commonly sold in florists around Australia. It is occasionally grown in gardens as its bright flower spikes are prominent, but requires a Mediterranean climate (dry summer) and good drainage as it is sensitive to dieback. Seeds do not require any treatment, and take 26 to 47 days to germinate. A dwarf form is in cultivation.
