= Meissner's taxonomic arrangement of Banksia =

156 arrangement of the Australian endemic plant series Dryandra in the genus Banksia

Carl Meissner's taxonomic arrangement of Banksia was published in 1856, as part of his chapter on the Proteaceae in A. P. de Candolle's Prodromus systematis naturalis regni vegetabilis. It was the first attempt to provide an infrageneric classification for the genus, aside from Robert Brown's publication of two subgenera in 1810. Meissner's arrangement stood until 1870, when it was superseded by the arrangement of George Bentham. Meissner's arrangement was an excellent survey of the known species at that time, but his infrageneric taxa were all highly heterogeneous.

== Background ==
Banksia is a genus of around 80 species in the plant family Proteaceae. An iconic Australian wildflower and popular garden plant, they are recognised by their flower spikes or domes, and their fruiting "cones". They grow in forms varying from prostrate woody shrubs to trees up to 35 metres tall, and occur in all but the most arid areas of Australia. As heavy producers of nectar, they are important sources of food for nectariferous animals such as honeyeaters and honey possum, and they are of economic importance to the nursery and cut flower industries. However they are seriously threatened by a number of processes including land clearing, frequent burning, and disease, and a number of species are rare and endangered.

Specimens of Banksia were first collected by Sir Joseph Banks and Dr Daniel Solander, naturalists on the Endeavour during Lieutenant (later Captain) James Cook's 1770 voyage to the Pacific Ocean. By the time of Meissner's arrangement, 58 species were recognised. The most recent taxonomic arrangement, which had stood since 1830, was Brown's 1830 arrangement. Brown had divided Banksia into two unranked taxa: Banksia verae ("true banksia"), later renamed Eubanksia, containing all species with the flower spike then considered characteristic of the genus; and Isostylis, containing only B. ilicifolia, which is unusual in having a dome-shaped inflorescence.

== Meissner's arrangement ==
Meissner retained Brown's subgenera, but demoted them to sectional rank. He then further divided Eubanksia into four series, B. ser. Abietinae, B. ser. Salicinae, B. ser. Quercinae and B. ser. Dryandroideae. B. ser. Abietinae contained only (but not all) species with hooked styles. The other three series were heterogeneous.

Meissner's taxonomic arrangement of Banksia may be summarised as follows:

Banksia

B. sect. Eubanksia

B. ser. Abietinæ

B. pulchella
B. Meisneri
B. sphærocarpa

B. sphaerocarpa var. glabrescens (now B. incana)

B. pinifolia (now B. leptophylla)
B. nutans
B. ericifolia
B. spinulosa
B. tricuspis

B. ser Salicinæ

B. cunninghamii (now B. spinulosa var. cunninghamii)
B. collina (now B. spinulosa var. collina)
B. occidentalis
B. littoralis
B. cylindrostachya (now B. attenuata)
B. lindleyana
B. marginata

B. marginata var. Cavanillesii (now B. marginata)
B. marginata var. microstachya (now B. marginata)
B. marginata var. humilis (now B. marginata)

B. depressa (now B. marginata)

B. depressa var. subintegra (now B. marginata)

B. patula (now B. marginata)
B. australis (now B. marginata)
B. Gunnii (now B. marginata)
B. insularis (now B. marginata)
B. integrifolia

B. integrifolia var. minor (now B. integrifolia subsp. integrifolia)
B. integrifolia var. major (now B. integrifolia subsp. integrifolia)
B. integrifolia var. dentata (now B. robur)

B. compar (now B. integrifolia subsp. compar)
B. paludosa
B. verticillata
B. media
B. attenuata
B. elatior (now B. aemula)
B. lævigata
B. Hookeriana
B. prionotes
B. Menziesii

B. ser. Quercinæ

B. coccinea
B. sceptrum
B. Baueri
B. ornata
B. latifolia (now B. robur)
B. marcescens (now B. praemorsa)
B. oblongifolia
B. serrata
B. æmula
B. Caleyi

B. caleyi var. sinuosa (now B. caleyi)

B. Lemanniana
B. quercifolia
B. dentata
B. prostrata (now B. gardneri)
B. Goodii
B. barbigera
B. repens
B. Solandri

B. solandri var. major (now B. solandri)

B. ser. Dryandroideæ

B. grandis
B. Baxteri
B. speciosa
B. Victoriæ
B. elegans
B. Candolleana
B. dryandroides
B. Brownii

B. sect. Isostylis

B. ilicifolia

== Legacy ==
Meissner's arrangement remained current until 1870, when it was superseded by George Bentham's arrangement as published in Volume V of Flora Australiensis. Section Isostylis is now maintained at subgenus level as Banksia subg. Isostylis. Meissner's four series were discarded by Bentham, but their names were recycled by Alex George in his 1891 arrangement. All four names are still in use, but their definitions and therefore contents have changed substantially.
