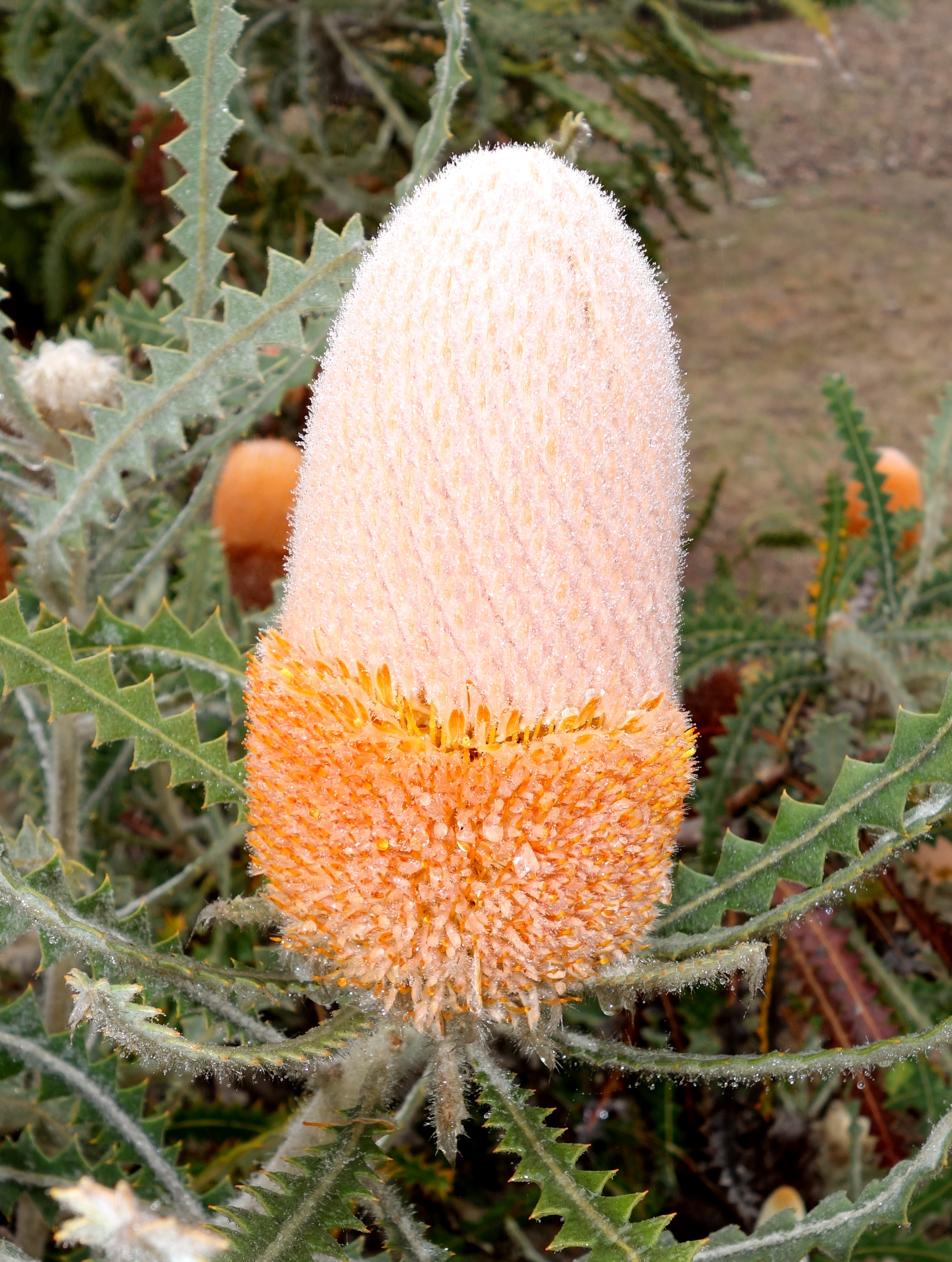

Conservation status
- Vulnerable (IUCN 3.1)

Scientific classification
- Kingdom: Plantae
- Clade: Embryophytes
- Clade: Tracheophytes
- Clade: Spermatophytes
- Clade: Angiosperms
- Clade: Eudicots
- Order: Proteales
- Family: Proteaceae
- Genus: Banksia
- Species: B. victoriae

Binomial name
- Banksia victoriae Meisn.

Synonyms
- Sirmuellera victoriae (Meisn.) Kuntze

= Banksia victoriae =

Woolly orange banksia

Species of plant endemic to Western Australia

Banksia victoriae, commonly known as woolly orange banksia, is a species of large shrub or small tree in the plant genus Banksia. It occurs in Western Australia between Northampton, Western Australia and Kalbarri, with the occasional plant further north as far as Zuytdorp Nature Reserve.

== Description ==
B. victoriae typically grows as a tall shrub, but older plants sometimes attain a tree habit, growing as high as seven metres. It has smooth grey back and densely hairy stems. Leaves are 15 to 30 centimetres (5.9 to 12 in) long and 2.5 to 4 centimetres (0.98 to 1.6 in) wide, with deep triangular lobes and woolly surfaces. Flowers occur in typical Banksia "flower spikes", inflorescences made up of hundreds of pairs of flowers densely packed in a spiral about a woody axis. B. victoriae's inflorescence is orange, 7 to 12 centimetres (2.8 to 4.7 in) long. After flowering, up to 30 follicles develop in the flower spike. These are usually concealed by withered flower parts, which persist on the spike for a long time.

== Taxonomy ==
=== Discovery and naming ===
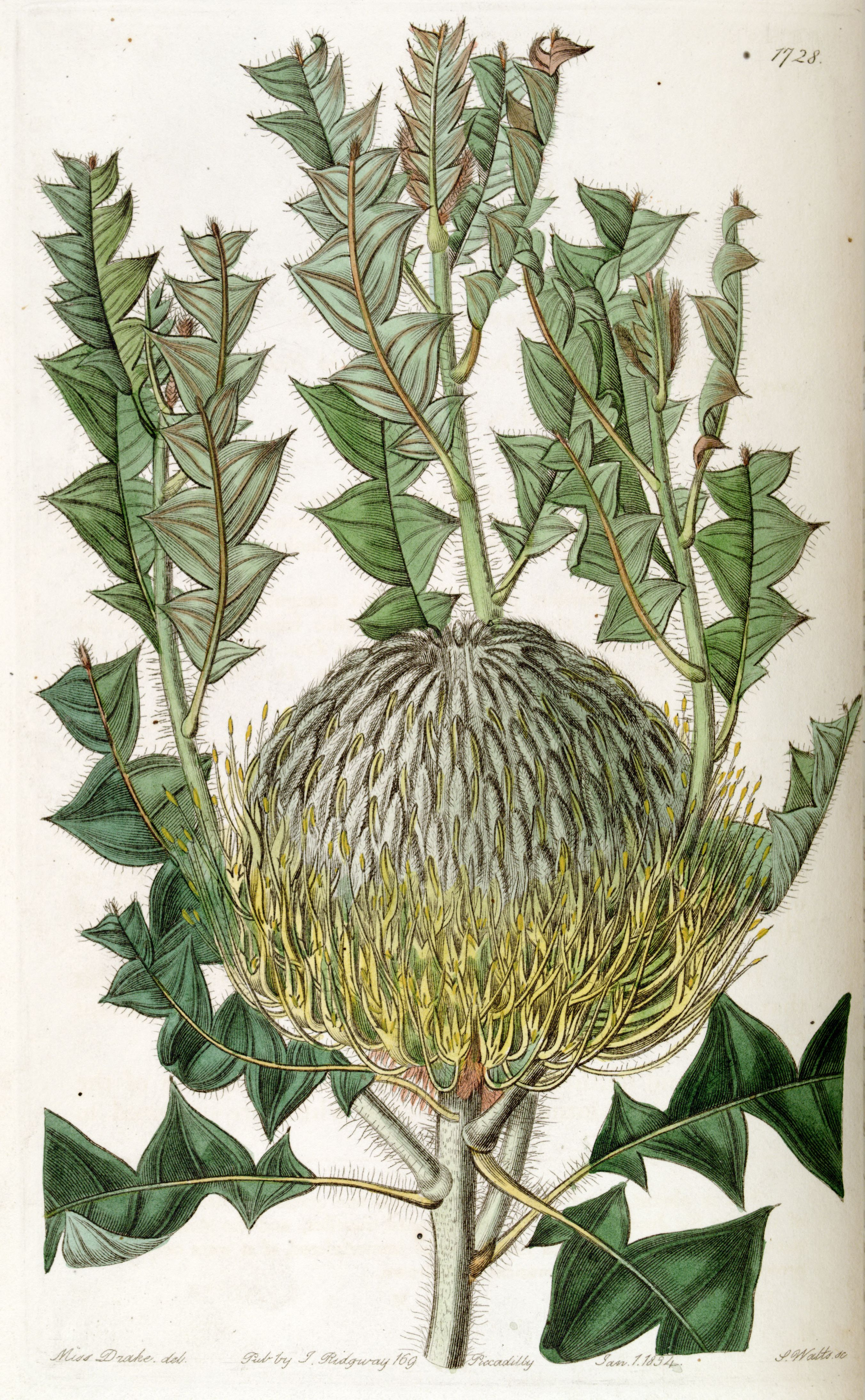
A scan of Plate 1728 of Edwards's Botanical Register, published in 1835. The plate nominally showed B. speciosa (Showy Banksia), but was subsequently identified by some as the then-unpublished B. victoriae. However, clearly it is an accurate representation of Banksia baxteri, which does grow alongside B. speciosa in part of its range.

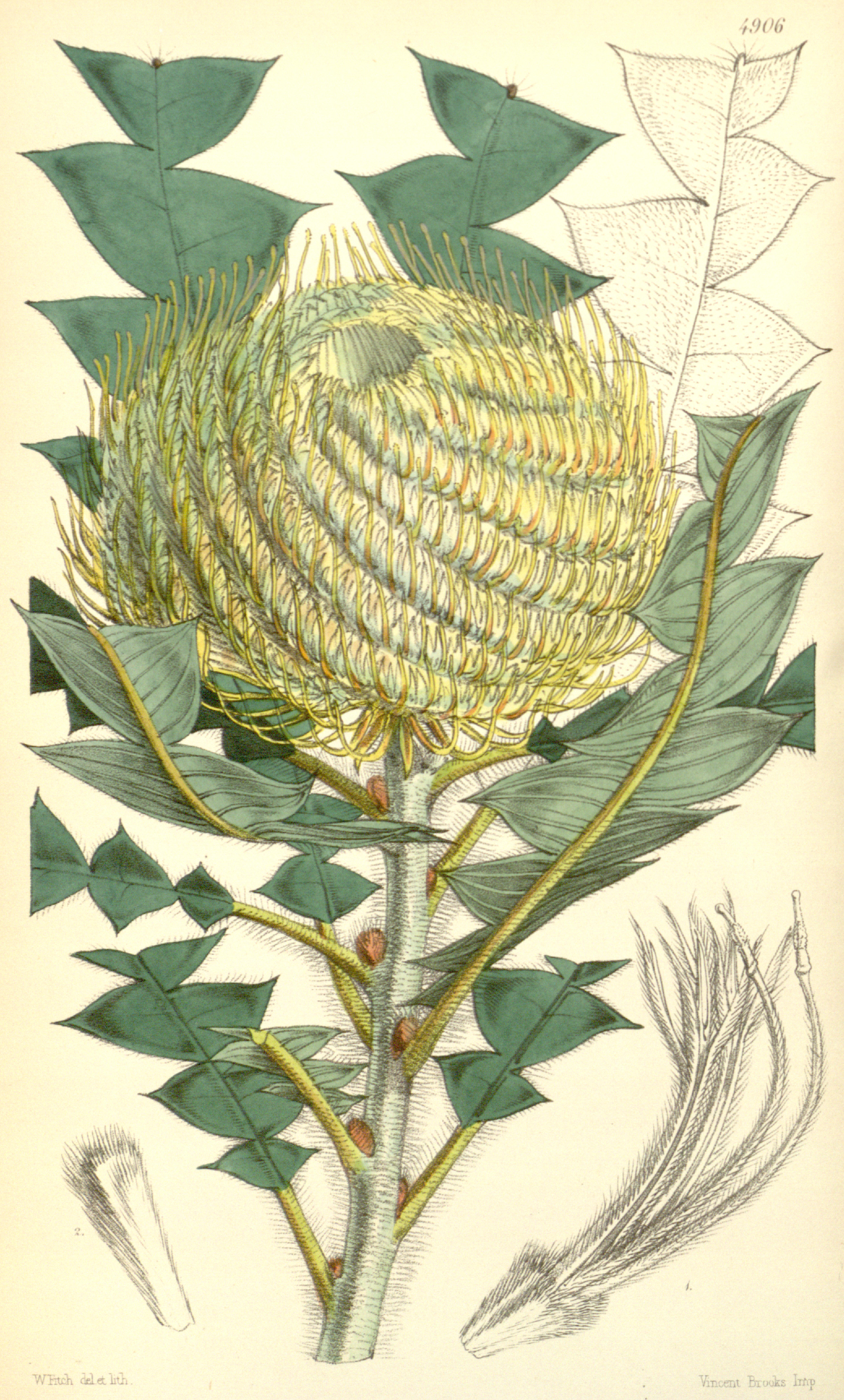
Plate 4906 from Curtis's Botanical Magazine, published in 1857

The first known specimens of B. victoriae may have been seeds sent to England in the early 1830s. These seeds were distributed to a number of gardens, and by 1835 three gardens had successfully raised plants to flowering: the Royal Botanic Garden Edinburgh, the garden of George Percy, 5th Duke of Northumberland, and that of Henry Berens of Sidcup. In that year, the second of these was painted by Sarah Drake, and included as Plate 1728 in Edwards's Botanical Register. In the accompanying text, John Lindley identified the plant as B. speciosa (Showy Banksia), but commented "We found neither the whiteness of the under side of the leaves, nor the faintness of the veins, which are supposed to be characteristic of the species". Doubts were raised about the identity of the species in 1857, when Walter Hood Fitch painted B. victoriae based on a cut flower provided by David Moore of Glasnevin Botanical Garden. Fitch's painting appeared as Plate 4906 in Volume 82 of Curtis's Botanical Magazine, and was accompanied by the text: "There can, I think, be no doubt of its being the same with the B. speciosa above quoted in the Bot. Reg., but not the B. speciosa of Br. and Hook., Bot. Mag. t. 3052; and equally certain does it appear to be the B. Victoriæ of Meisner." Thus it was implied that 1835 plate was in fact B. victoriae, a suggestion that was supported by George Bentham in his treatment of the species in his 1870 Flora Australiensis.

Despite this possible early collection, it would not be until 1850 or 1851 that James Drummond collected the plant material upon which would be based the formal publication of B. victoriae. He collected the species only once, probably from near the Hutt River, and his material was sent to England as part of Drummond's sixth collection. In 1855 Carl Meissner published a formal description of the species in Hooker's Journal of Botany and Kew Garden Miscellany, referring to it as "a noble species, very near B. speciosa, but easily distinguished by the segments of the leaves being larger, flat, not white underneath, nor scrobiculate above, etc.". He named it in honour of Queen Victoria; thus the full name for the species is Banksia victoriae Meisn. He appears to have been unaware of the 1835 plate that would later be attributed to B. victoriae.

The common name is woolly orange banksia.

=== Infrageneric placement ===
Although Meissner did not proffer an infrageneric placement for B. victoriae in his 1855 publication of the species, he did so the following year in his chapter on the Proteaceae for A. P. de Candolle's Prodromus systematis naturalis regni vegetabilis. Under Meissner's taxonomic arrangement of Banksia, B. victoriae was placed in section Eubanksia, series Dryandroideae. This arrangement stood until 1870, which George Bentham published his arrangement, in which he placed the species in section Orthostylis.

In 1891, Otto Kuntze, in his Revisio Generum Plantarum, rejected the generic name Banksia L.f., on the grounds that the name Banksia had previously been published in 1776 as Banksia J.R.Forst & G.Forst, referring to the genus now known as Pimelea. Kuntze proposed Sirmuellera as an alternative, referring to this species as Sirmuellera victoriae. This application of the principle of priority was largely ignored by Kuntze's contemporaries, and Banksia L.f. was formally conserved and Sirmuellera rejected in 1940.

Bentham's arrangement stood for over a century, before being superseded by Alex George's revision, published in his 1981 monograph The genus Banksia L.f. (Proteaceae). George placed the species in Banksia subgenus Banksia, section Banksia, series Crocinae. This placement was rejected by Kevin Thiele and Pauline Ladiges in 1996; their arrangement, which was based on a cladistic analysis of morphological features, discarded Crocinae altogether, instead placing B. victoriae in series Banksia, subseries Cratistylis, alongside B. burdettii (Burdett's Banksia). However, George did not accept this revision, and overturned it in his 1999 monograph for the Flora of Australia series.

Under George's taxonomic arrangement of Banksia, B. victoriae placement may be summarised as follows:

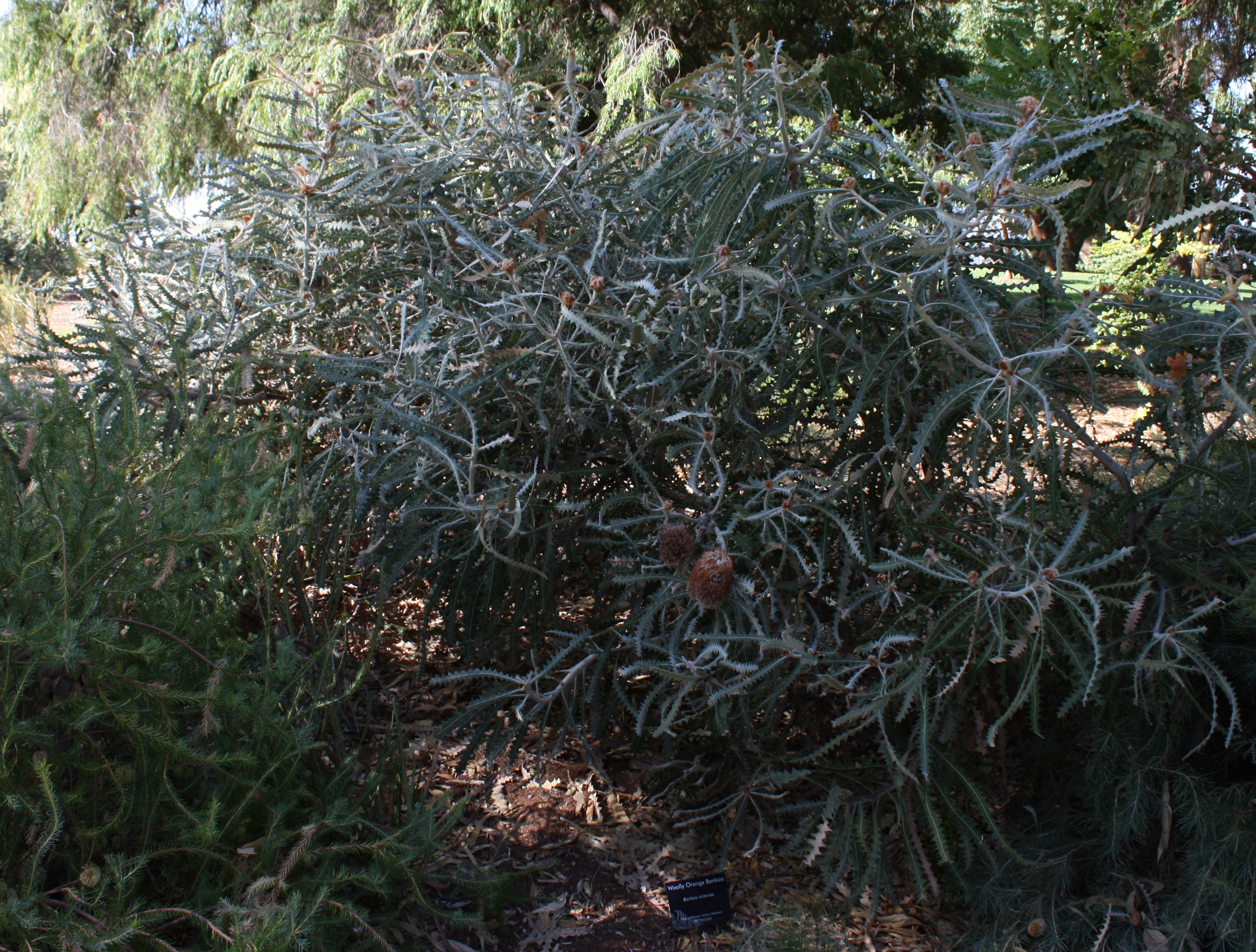
Typical shrubby habit

Genus Banksia

Subgenus Banksia

Section Banksia

Series Salicinae
Series Grandes
Series Banksia
Series Crocinae

B. prionotes - B. burdettii - B. hookeriana - B. victoriae

Series Prostratae
Series Cyrtostylis
Series Tetragonae
Series Bauerinae
Series Quercinae

Section Coccinea
Section Oncostylis

Subgenus Isostylis

Since 1998, Austin Mast has been publishing results of ongoing cladistic analyses of DNA sequence data for the subtribe Banksiinae, which comprises Banksia and Dryandra. Mast's analysis strongly supports Thiele's placement of B. victoriae, finding it to fall within a clade with B. menziesii (Menzies' Banksia), B. burdettii, B. hookeriana (Hooker's Banksia) and B. prionotes (Acorn Banksia), all of which are members of Thiele and Ladiges' Cratistylis. Overall, the inferred phylogeny is very greatly different from George's arrangement, and provides compelling evidence for the paraphyly of Banksia with respect to Dryandra. Early in 2007, Mast and Thiele initiated a rearrangement of Banksia by transferring Dryandra into it, and publishing B. subg. Spathulatae for the species having spoon-shaped cotyledons; thus they also redefined the autonym B. subg. Banksia as containing the species not having spoon-shaped cotyledons. They foreshadowed publishing a full arrangement once DNA sampling of Dryandra was complete; in the meantime, if Mast and Thiele's nomenclatural changes are taken as an interim arrangement, then B. victoriae is placed in B. subg. Banksia.

== Distribution and habitat ==
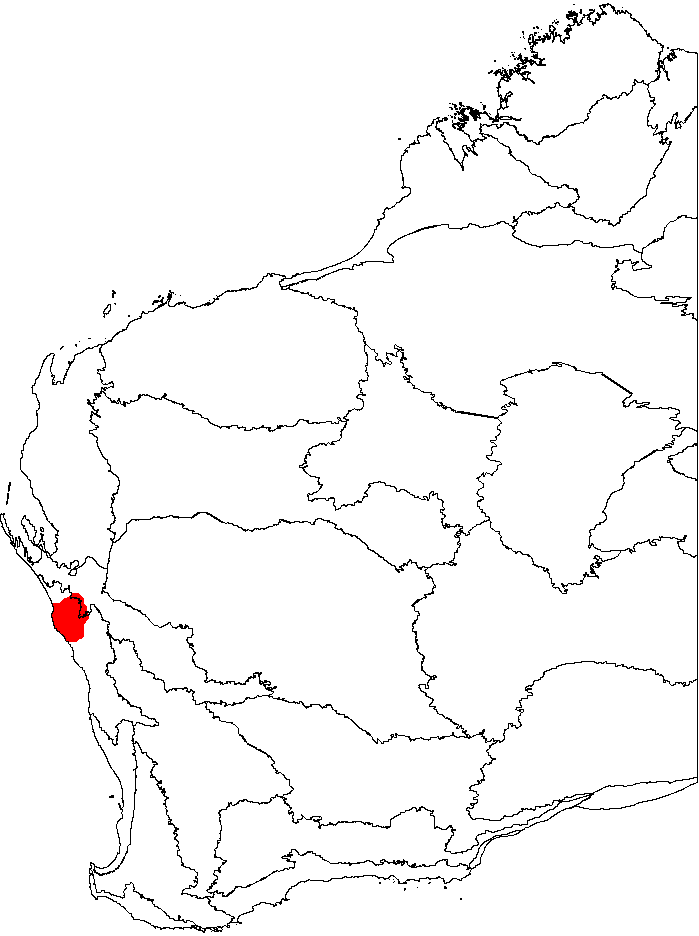
Distribution of B. victoriae, shown on a map of Western Australia's biogeographic regions

B. victoriae occurs only within a fairly small areas between Northampton and the lower reaches of the Murchison River. Under Version 5.1 of the Interim Biogeographic Regionalisation for Australia (IBRA), this distribution fell entirely without the Geraldton Sandplains biogeographic region. However the boundary between the Geraldton Sandplains and Yalgoo biogeographic regions has been substantially redrawn for IBRA Version 6.1, and it is not clear from publicly available data whether the species should now be considered to occur also in the Yalgoo region.

The species grows in deep yellow or pale red sand, amongst tall shrubland. It was previously thought to occur only 20 to 30 kilometres (10 to 20 mi) from the coast, but during The Banksia Atlas project, a few specimens were found within just a few kilometres of the coast. Although restricted to a small area, it is quite common within this area, and is sometimes dominates the vegetation.

== Ecology ==
Like most other Proteaceae, B. victoriae has proteoid roots, roots with dense clusters of short lateral rootlets that form a mat in the soil just below the leaf litter. These enhance solubilisation of nutrients, thus allowing nutrient uptake in low-nutrient soils such as the phosphorus-deficient native soils of Australia.

The species lacks a lignotuber, so plants are killed by bushfire. However, it is adapted to release its aerial seed bank following a bushfire, and so regenerates rapidly. This behaviour, known as serotiny, makes B. victoriae dependent upon a suitable fire regime for successful regeneration. Other threats to the species include susceptibility to Phytophthora cinnamomi dieback, and the loss of flowers due to harvesting for the cut flower trade. However, it is not currently considered endangered, partly because a significant proportion of the population occur within the Kalbarri National Park; it has not been given a rating under Western Australia's Department of Environment and Conservation's Declared Rare and Priority Flora List.

== Cultivation ==
With attractive, deep-green foliage and large, brightly coloured flowers that are held outside the canopy, B. victoriae is a popular garden plant. It requires a sunny aspect in well-drained soil, and is sensitive to frost. Seeds do not require any treatment, and take 27 to 41 days to germinate. It is easy to propagate from seed, but rather difficult from cuttings. It grows quickly, and flowers in three to four years from seed. George recommends only light pruning, not below the green foliage.

It is also very popular for cut flower production, not just because of its attractive foliage and flower spikes, but also because flower spikes occur terminally on a branch, allowing flowers to be cut with a stem.
