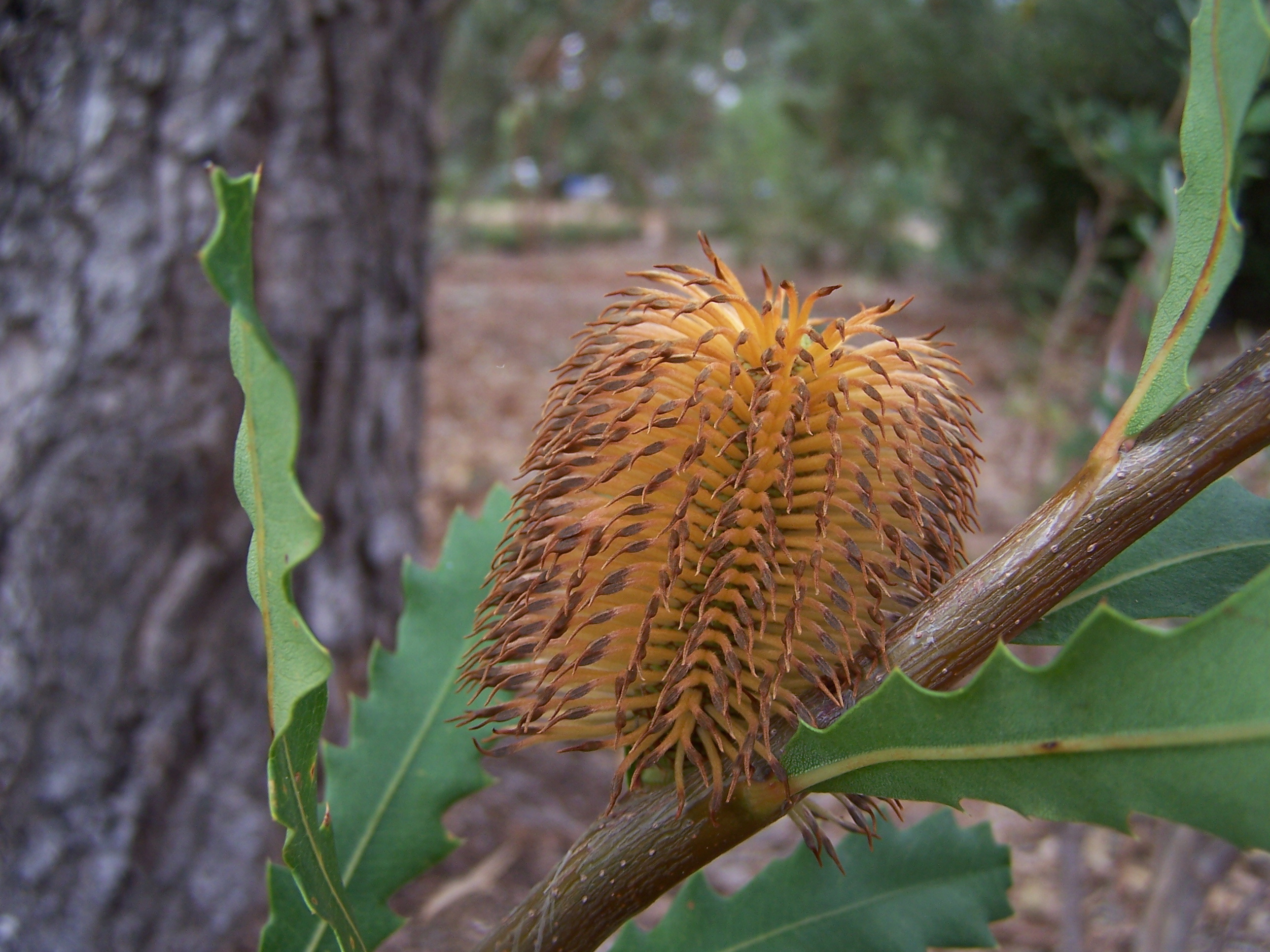
- B. quercifolia (oak-leaved banksia), the type species of B. ser. Quercinae

Scientific classification
- Kingdom: Plantae
- Clade: Tracheophytes
- Clade: Angiosperms
- Clade: Eudicots
- Order: Proteales
- Family: Proteaceae
- Genus: Banksia
- Subgenus: Banksia subg. Banksia
- Section: Banksia sect. Banksia
- Series: Banksia ser. Quercinae; Meisn.

= Banksia ser. Quercinae =

Taxonomic series of Australian plants

Banksia ser. Quercinae is a valid botanic name for a series of Banksia. First published by Carl Meissner in 1856, the name has had three circumscriptions.

== According to Meissner ==
B. ser. Quercinae was first published in 1856, in Carl Meissner's chapter on the Proteaceae in A. P. de Candolle's Prodromus systematis naturalis regni vegetabilis. It was one of four series into which the subgenus Eubanksia was divided. These four series were defined in terms of leaf characters, with series Quercinae containing the species with strongly dentate, cuneate to obovate leaves. As they were defined on leaf characters alone, all of Meissner's series were highly heterogeneous.

The placement and circumscription of B. ser. Quercinae in Meissner's arrangement may be summarised as follows:

Banksia

B. sect. Eubanksia

B. ser. Abietinae (8 species, 1 variety)
B. ser. Salicinae (23 species, 8 varieties)
B. ser. Quercinae

B. coccinea
B. sceptrum
B. Baueri
B. ornata
B. latifolia (now B. robur)
B. marcescens (now B. praemorsa)
B. oblongifolia
B. serrata
B. æmula
B. Caleyi

B. caleyi var. sinuosa (now B. caleyi)

B. Lemanniana
B. quercifolia
B. dentata
B. prostrata (now B. gardneri)
B. Goodii
B. barbigera
B. repens
B. Solandri

B. solandri var. major (now B. solandri)

B. ser. Dryandroideae (8 species)

B. sect. Isostylis (1 species)

Meissner's arrangement was current until 1870, when George Bentham published his arrangement, discarding all four of Meissner's series.

== According to George ==
In 1981, Alex George published a thorough revision of Banksia in his classic monograph The genus Banksia L.f. (Proteaceae). He reinstated B. ser. Quercinae, placing it within B. sect. Banksia, and redefining it as containing those species with awned perianths, and beaked follicles. Initially, the series contained three species, but in 1988 George moved B. baueri (woolly orange banksia) into its own series, B. ser. Bauerinae, leaving just B. quercifolia (oak-leaved banksia) and B. oreophila (western mountain banksia) in B. ser. Quercinae.

The placement and circumscription of B. ser. Quercinae in George's taxonomic arrangement of Banksia may be summarised as follows:

Banksia

B. subg. Banksia

B. sect. Banksia

B. ser. Salicinae (11 species, 7 subspecies)
B. ser. Grandes (2 species)
B. ser. Banksia (8 species)
B. ser. Crocinae (4 species)
B. ser. Prostratae (6 species, 3 varieties)
B. ser. Cyrtostylis (13 species, 2 subspecies)
B. ser. Tetragonae (3 species)
B. ser. Bauerinae (1 species)
B. ser. Quercinae

B. quercifolia
B. oreophila

B. sect. Coccinea (1 species)
B. sect. Oncostylis (3 series, 22 species, 4 subspecies, 11 varieties)

B. subg. Isostylis (3 species)

== According to Thiele and Ladiges ==
In 1996, Kevin Thiele and Pauline Ladiges undertook a cladistic analysis of morphological characters of Banksia, which yielded a phylogeny somewhat at odds with George's taxonomic arrangement. B. ser. Quercinae was found to be monophyletic, though quite closely related to B. ser. Spicigerae. They therefore retained the series, placing it next to B. ser. Spicigerae in their arrangement.

The placement and circumscription of B. ser. Quercinae in Thiele and Ladiges' arrangement may be summarised as follows:

Banksia

B. subg. Isostylis (3 species)
B. elegans (incertae sedis)
B. subg. Banksia

B. ser. Tetragonae (4 species)
B. ser. Lindleyanae (1 species)
B. ser. Banksia (2 subseries, 12 species)
B. baueri (incertae sedis)
B. lullfitzii (incertae sedis)
B. attenuata (incertae sedis)
B. ashbyi (incertae sedis)
B. coccinea (incertae sedis)
B. ser. Prostratae (8 species)
B. ser. Cyrtostylis (4 species)
B. ser. Ochraceae (3 species, 2 subspecies)
B. ser. Grandes (2 species)
B. ser. Salicinae (2 subseries, 11 species, 4 subspecies)
B. ser. Spicigerae (3 subseries, 7 species, 6 varieties)
B. ser. Quercinae

B. quercifolia
B. oreophila

B. ser. Dryandroideae (1 species)
B. ser. Abietinae (4 subseries, 15 species, 8 varieties)

Thiele and Ladiges' arrangement remained current only until 1999, when George's treatment of the genus for the Flora of Australia series of monographs was published. This was essentially a revision of George's 1981 arrangement, which took into account some of Thiele and Ladiges' data, but rejected their overall arrangement. With respect to B. ser. Quercinae, George's 1999 arrangement was no different from that of 1988.

== Recent developments ==
Since 1998, Austin Mast has been publishing results of ongoing cladistic analyses of DNA sequence data for the subtribe Banksiinae. His analyses suggest a phylogeny that is very greatly different from George's taxonomic arrangement, including finding Banksia to be paraphyletic with respect to Dryandra. With respect to B. ser. Quercinae, however, Mast's analysis concurs with previous arrangements, placing its two species alone in a clade that is fairly widely separated from other clades.

Early in 2007 Mast and Thiele initiated a rearrangement of Banksia by transferring Dryandra into it, and publishing B. subg. Spathulatae for the species having spoon-shaped cotyledons. The members of B. ser. Quercinae fall within B. subg. Spathulatae, but no further details have been proffered. Mast and Thiele have foreshadowed publishing a full arrangement once DNA sampling of Dryandra is complete.
