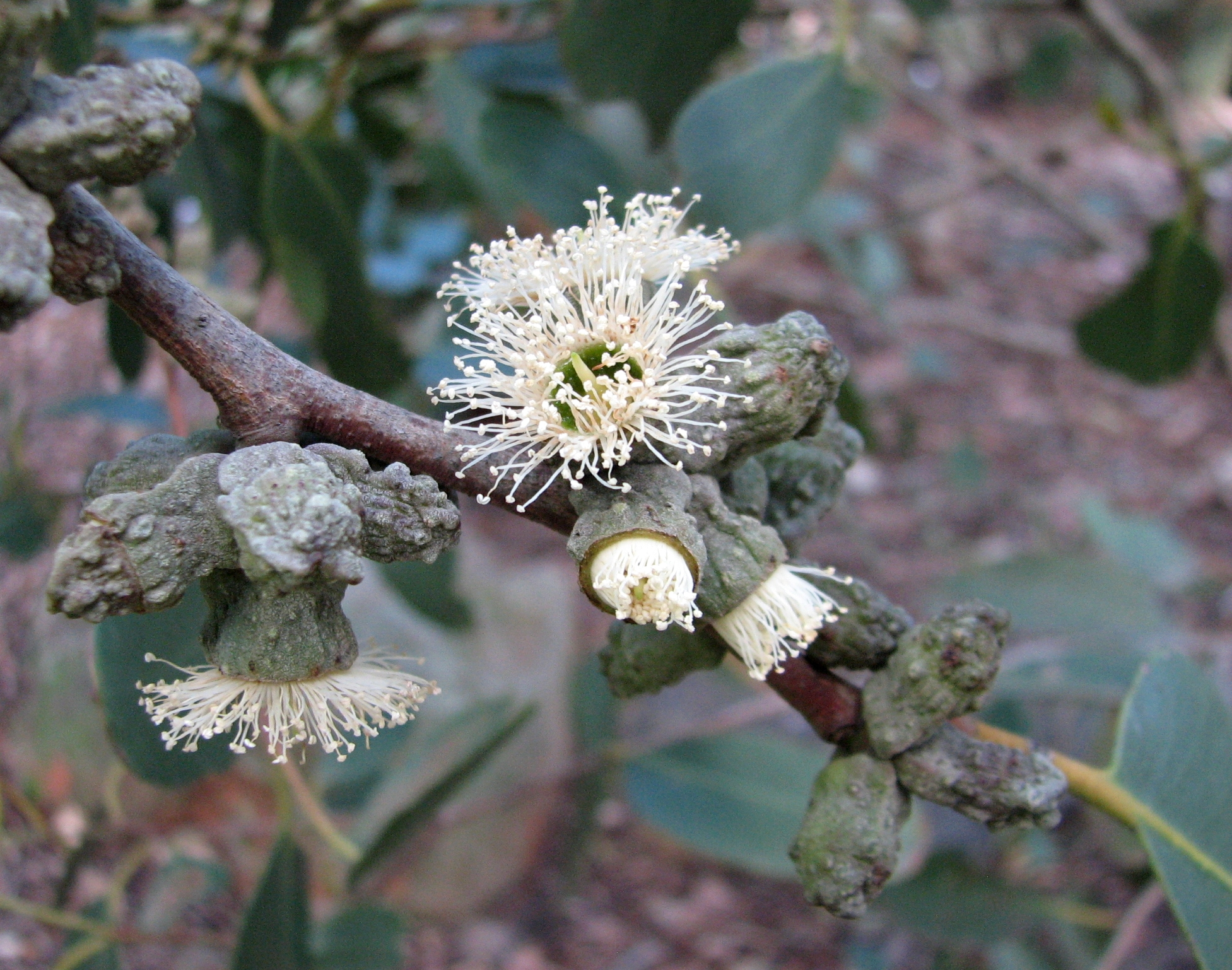

Scientific classification
- Kingdom: Plantae
- Clade: Tracheophytes
- Clade: Angiosperms
- Clade: Eudicots
- Clade: Rosids
- Order: Myrtales
- Family: Myrtaceae
- Genus: Eucalyptus
- Species: E. verrucata

Binomial name
- Eucalyptus verrucata Ladiges & Whiffin

= Eucalyptus verrucata =

Mount Abrupt stringybark

Species of eucalyptus

Eucalyptus verrucata, commonly known as Mount Abrupt stringybark, is a species of shrub or a small tree that is endemic to the Grampians in Victoria, Australia. It has smooth bark, rough bark on the base of older trees, egg-shaped to elliptical adult leaves, flower buds usually singly in groups of three in leaf axils, white flowers and cup-shaped or hemispherical fruit.

== Description ==
Eucalyptus verrucata is a shrub or a tree that typically grows to a height of 5 m (16 ft) and forms a lignotuber. It has smooth greyish to brownish bark, sometimes hard, fibrous bark on the base of the trunk of older plants. Young plants and coppice regrowth have sessile, broadly egg-shaped leaves that are oblong to egg-shaped or heart-shaped, 60–108 mm (2.4–4.3 in) long and 40–83 mm (1.6–3.3 in) wide, with stem-clasping bases. Adult leaves are the same shade of glossy green on both sides, egg-shaped to elliptical or round, 55–120 mm (2.2–4.7 in) long and 25–90 mm (0.98–3.54 in) wide on a petiole 12–28 mm (0.47–1.10 in) long. The flower buds are arranged singly or in groups of three or seven on an unbranched peduncle up to 2 mm (0.079 in) long, the individual buds sessile. Mature buds are very warty, oblong to spherical, 10–18 mm (0.39–0.71 in) long and 8–14 mm (0.31–0.55 in) wide with a rounded to flattened operculum. Flowering has been observed in July and September and the flowers are white. The fruit is a woody cup-shaped or hemispherical capsule 12–20 mm (0.47–0.79 in) long and 16–32 mm (0.63–1.26 in) wide with the valves protruding prominently.

== Taxonomy and naming ==
Eucalyptus verrucata was first formally described in 1995 by Pauline Y. Ladiges and Trevor Paul Whiffin in Australian Systematic Botany from specimens collected in 1979 on the south-east side of Mount Abrupt at an altitude of 400 m (1,300 ft). The specific epithet (verrucata) is from the Latin word verrucatus meaning "warty", referring to the flower buds.

== Distribution and habitat ==
The Mount Abrupt stringybark grows in rocky places on the southern end of the Serra Range in the Grampians National Park.

== See also ==
- List of Eucalyptus species
