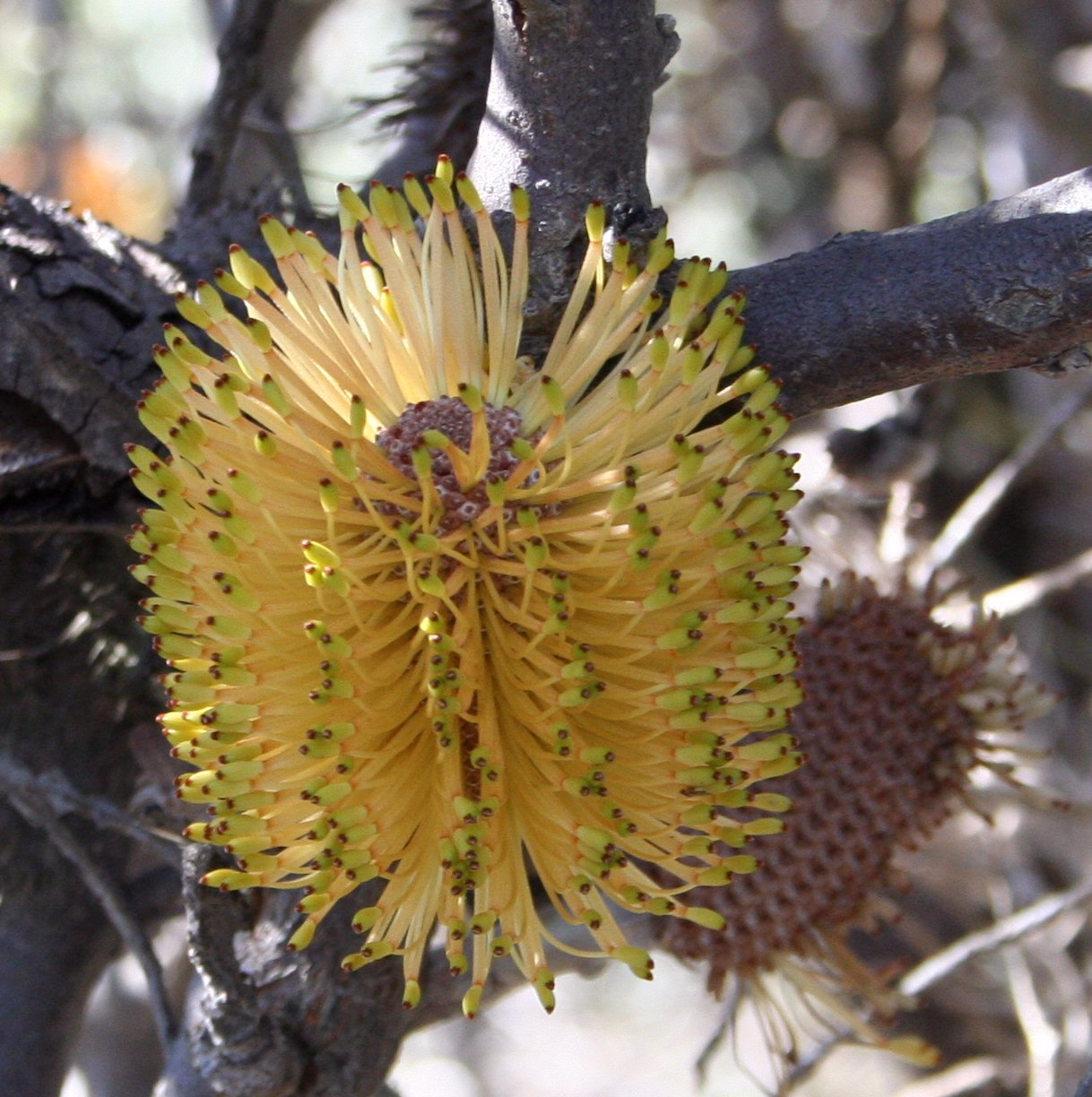
- Banksia candolleana, near Badgingarra

Scientific classification
- Kingdom: Plantae
- Clade: Tracheophytes
- Clade: Angiosperms
- Clade: Eudicots
- Order: Proteales
- Family: Proteaceae
- Genus: Banksia
- Species: B. candolleana

Binomial name
- Banksia candolleana Meisn.

Synonyms
- Sirmuellera candolleana (Meisn.) Kuntze

= Banksia candolleana =

Propeller banksia

Species of shrub endemic to Western Australia

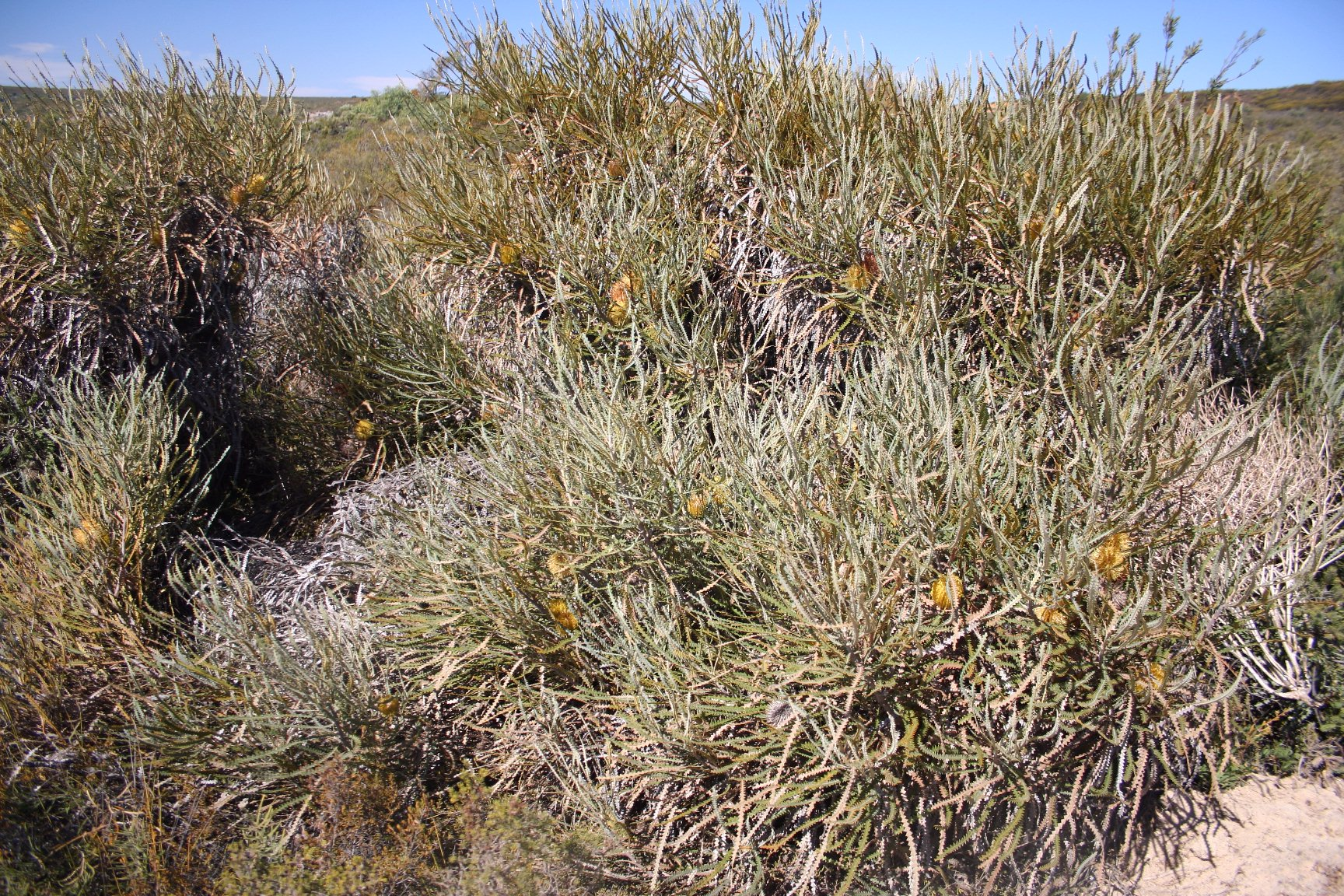
Habit in the Wotto Nature Reserve

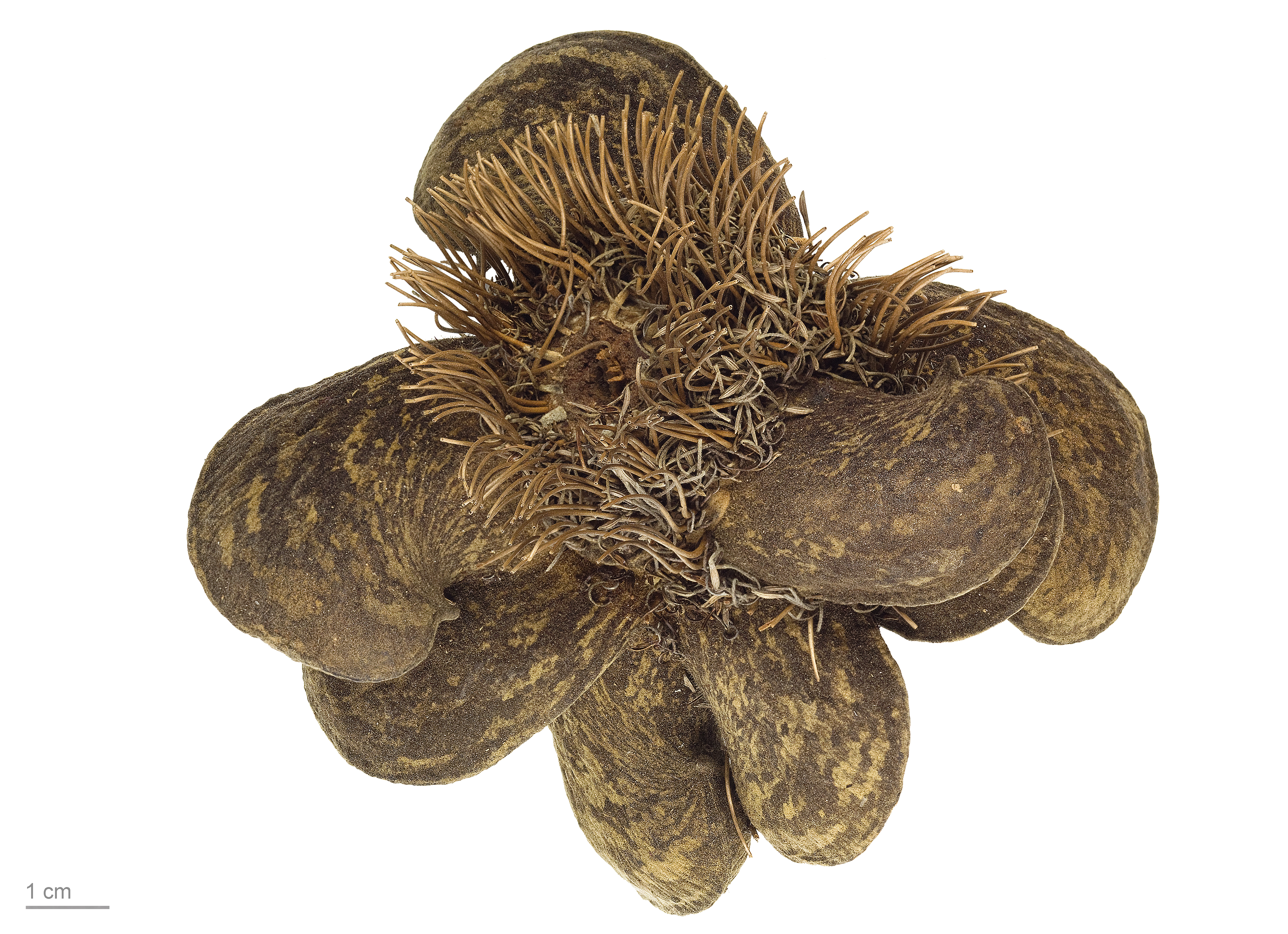
Follicles

Banksia candolleana, commonly known as the propeller banksia, is a species of shrub that is endemic to Western Australia. It has shiny green, deeply serrated leaves with triangular lobes and spikes of golden yellow flowers on short side branches.

== Description ==
Banksia candolleana is a many-branched shrub that typically grows to 0.5–1.3 m (1 ft 8 in – 4 ft 3 in) high, up to 2.5 m (8 ft 2 in) wide and forms a lignotuber. Its leaves are linear in outline, 15–40 mm (0.59–1.57 in) long and 6–20 mm (0.24–0.79 in) wide on a hairy petiole 10–20 mm (0.39–0.79 in) long. The leaves are shiny green with deep triangular lobes on the margins. The flower spikes are arranged in oval spikes 15–40 mm (0.59–1.57 in) long and 55–75 mm (2.2–3.0 in) wide on short side branches. The flowers are golden yellow with a perianth 20–27 mm (0.79–1.06 in) long and a curved pistil 25–35 mm (0.98–1.38 in) long. Flowering occurs from April to July and usually up to five curved, egg-shaped follicles 20–65 mm (0.79–2.56 in) long, 25–50 mm (0.98–1.97 in) high, 17–35 mm (0.67–1.38 in) wide and surrounded by the old flowers form on each spike.

== Taxonomy ==
Banksia candolleana was first formally described in 1855 by the Swiss botanist Carl Meissner in William Jackson Hooker's Journal of Botany and Kew Garden Miscellany from specimens collected by James Drummond. The specific epithet honours Meissner's countryman Augustin Pyramus de Candolle.

In 1891, Otto Kuntze, in his Revisio Generum Plantarum, rejected the generic name Banksia L.f., on the grounds that the name Banksia had previously been published in 1776 as Banksia J.R.Forst & G.Forst, referring to the genus now known as Pimelea. Kuntze proposed Sirmuellera as an alternative, referring to this species as Sirmuellera candolleana. This application of the principle of priority was largely ignored by Kuntze's contemporaries, and Banksia L.f. was formally conserved and Sirmuellera rejected in 1940.

== Distribution and habitat ==
Propellor banksia is found from Arrowsmith south to Gingin on sandplains north of Perth where it usually grows in low kwongan and the annual rainfall is 600–700 mm (24–28 in).

== Ecology ==
Banksia candolleana regenerates from a woody lignotuber after bushfire. Some large shrubs have been estimated at 1,000 years old. The white-tailed dunnart (Sminthopsis granulipes) has been recorded visiting flowerheads, though whether it is an effective pollinator is unknown. Ants and bees, including the European honeybee, have been recorded visiting flower spikes.

== Use in horticulture ==
Banksia candolleana is slow growing in cultivation and may take up to 10 years to flower from seed. It grows readily in well-drained soils in Mediterranean climates, but does not do well in climates of higher humidity on the east coast of Australia. Seeds do not require any treatment, and take 22 to 35 days to germinate.
