= Carl Meissner =

Swiss botanist (1800–1874)

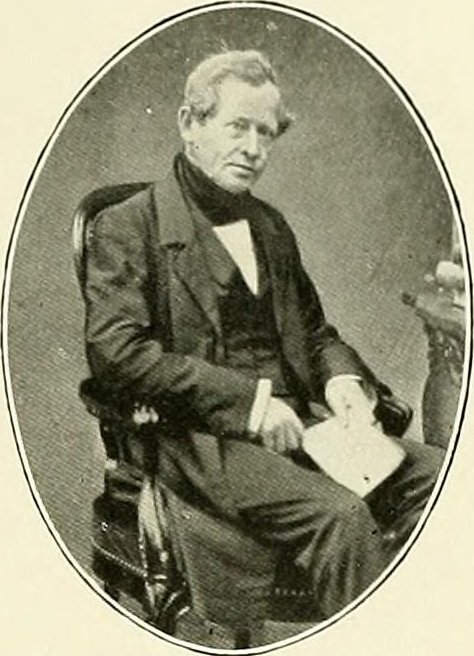
Carl Friedrich Meissner

Carl Daniel Friedrich Meissner (1 November 1800 – 2 May 1874) was a Swiss botanist.

== Biography ==
Born in Bern, Switzerland on 1 November 1800, he was christened Meisner but later changed the spelling of his name to Meissner. For most of his 40-year career he was Professor of Botany at University of Basel. He made important contributions to the botanical literature, including the publication of the comprehensive work Plantarum Vascularum Genera, and publications of monographs on the families Polygonaceae (especially the genus Polygonum), Lauraceae, Proteaceae, Thymelaeaceae and Hernandiaceae. His contributions to the description of the Australian flora were prolific; he described hundreds of species of Australian Proteaceae, and many Australian species from other families, especially Fabaceae, Mimosaceae and Myrtaceae. His health deteriorated after 1866, and he was less active. He died in Basel on 2 May 1874.

== See also ==
- Meissner's taxonomic arrangement of Banksia
- Category:Taxa named by Carl Meissner
