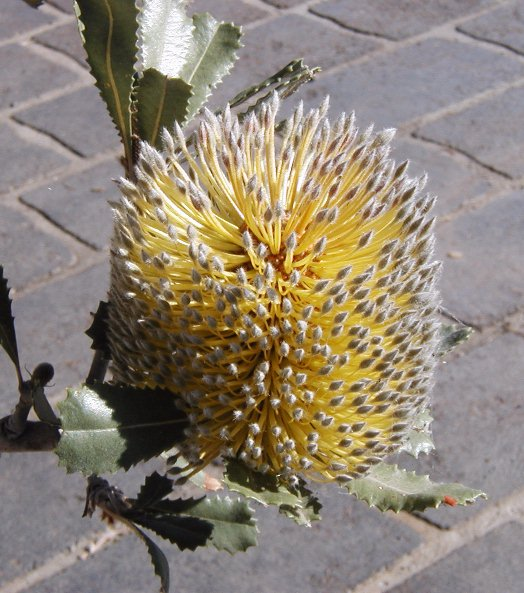
- Mount Annan Botanic Garden

Scientific classification
- Kingdom: Plantae
- Clade: Tracheophytes
- Clade: Angiosperms
- Clade: Eudicots
- Order: Proteales
- Family: Proteaceae
- Genus: Banksia
- Subgenus: Banksia subg. Banksia
- Species: B. ornata

Binomial name
- Banksia ornata F.Muell ex. Meisn.

Synonyms
- Banksia ornata var. rufa A.M.Ashby; Sirmuellera ornata (Meisn.) Kuntze

= Banksia ornata =

Desert banksia

Species of shrub native to Australia

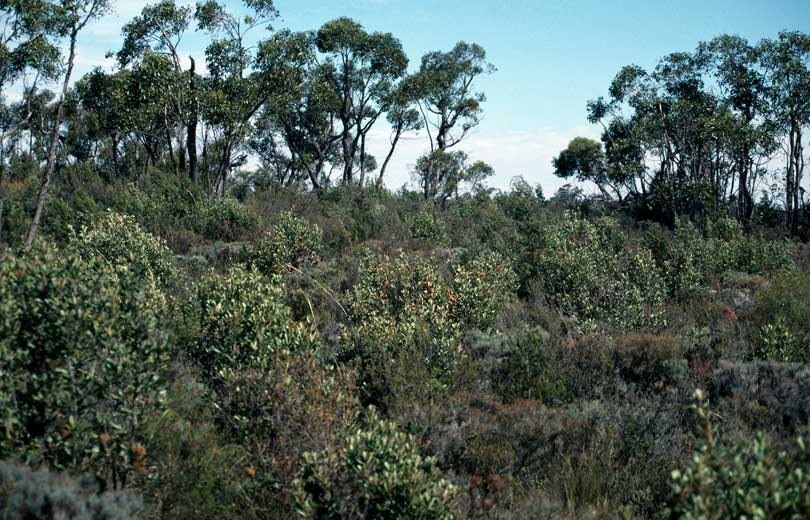
Habitat in Little Desert National Park

Banksia ornata, commonly known as desert banksia, is a species of shrub that is endemic to south-eastern continental Australia. The Ngarrindjeri people of the Lower Murray region in South Australia know it as yelakut. It has thin bark, serrated, narrow egg-shaped leaves with the lower end towards the base, cream-coloured flowers in a cylindrical spike, and later, up to fifty follicles in each spike, surrounded by the remains of the flowers.

== Description ==
Banksia ornata is a shrub that typically grows to a height of about 3 m (9.8 ft) but does not form a lignotuber. It has thin grey bark and stems that are hairy at first, later glabrous. The leaves are narrow egg-shaped with the narrower end towards the base, or wedge-shaped, 30–100 mm (1.2–3.9 in) long and 4–25 mm (0.16–0.98 in) wide on a petiole 5–10 mm (0.20–0.39 in) long. The flowers are cream-coloured and arranged in a broadly cylindrical spike 50–110 mm (2.0–4.3 in) long and 70–80 mm (2.8–3.1 in) wide when the flowers open. There are hairy involucral bracts at the base of the spike but they fall off before the flowers open. The perianth is 30–35 mm (1.2–1.4 in) long and the pistil 35–38 mm (1.4–1.5 in) long and slightly curved. Flowering occurs in most months but mainly in winter and spring and there are up to fifty elliptic follicles 15–20 mm (0.59–0.79 in) long and 10–15 mm (0.39–0.59 in) wide in each spike, surrounded by the remains of the old flowers.

== Taxonomy and naming ==
Banksia ornata was first formally described in 1854 by Carl Meissner from an unpublished description by Ferdinand von Mueller. The description was published in Linnaea: ein Journal für die Botanik in ihrem ganzen Umfange, oder Beiträge zur Pflanzenkunde. The specific epithet (ornata) is from the Latin word ornatus meaning "decorated", referring to the flowers and leaves.

== Distribution and habitat ==
Desert banksia is common in western Victoria and in South Australia. In South Australia it is found in the south-east of the state south of Nuriootpa, including on the lower Eyre Peninsula, Kangaroo Island and east of Adelaide. It is confined to the far west of Victoria, mainly between Murrayville and the Grampians. It tends to grow in mallee and heathland environments in sandy, well-drained soils.

== Ecology ==
Nectarivorous birds are attracted to this shrub. Species observed feeding at its flowers include Anthochaera carunculata (red wattlebird), Melithreptus brevirostris (brown-header honeyeater), Melithreptus lunatus (white-naped honeyeater) and Zosterops lateralis (silvereye).
