= Series (botany) =

Taxonomic rank in botany

The hierarchy of biological classification's eight major taxonomic ranks. Intermediate minor rankings are not shown.

In botany and plant taxonomy, a series is a subdivision of a genus, a taxonomic rank below that of section (and subsection) but above that of species.

Sections and/or series are typically used to help organize very large genera, which may contain hundreds of species.

== Cultivar marketing ==
The term "series" is also used (in seed marketing) for groupings of cultivars, but this term has no formal status with that meaning in the ICNCP.
