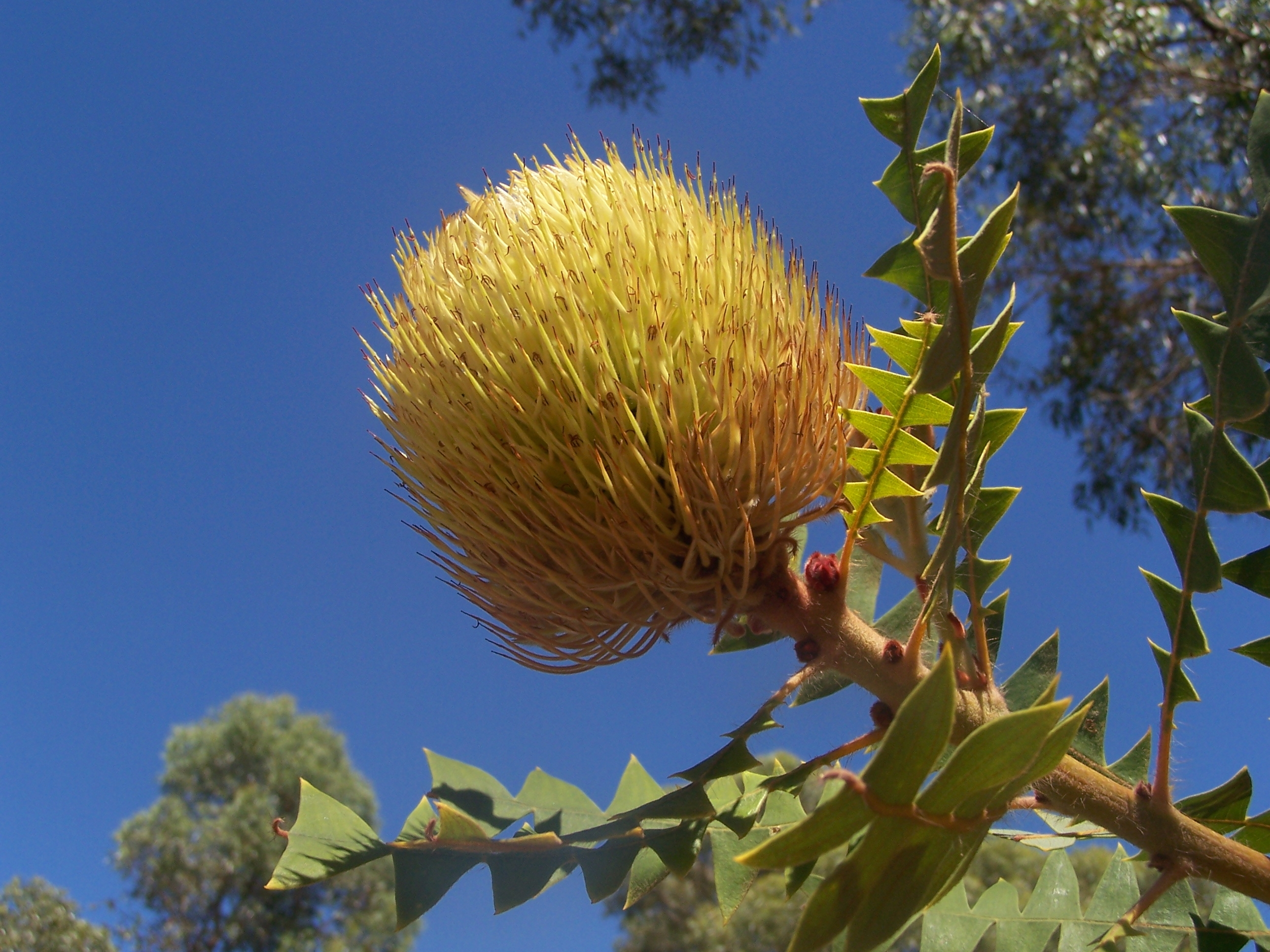
- Banksia baxteri in Kings Park, Western Australia

Scientific classification
- Kingdom: Plantae
- Clade: Tracheophytes
- Clade: Angiosperms
- Clade: Eudicots
- Order: Proteales
- Family: Proteaceae
- Genus: Banksia
- Species: B. baxteri

Binomial name
- Banksia baxteri R.Br.

Synonyms
- Sirmuellera baxteri (R.Br.) Kuntze

= Banksia baxteri =

Baxter's banksia

Species of shrub native to Western Australia

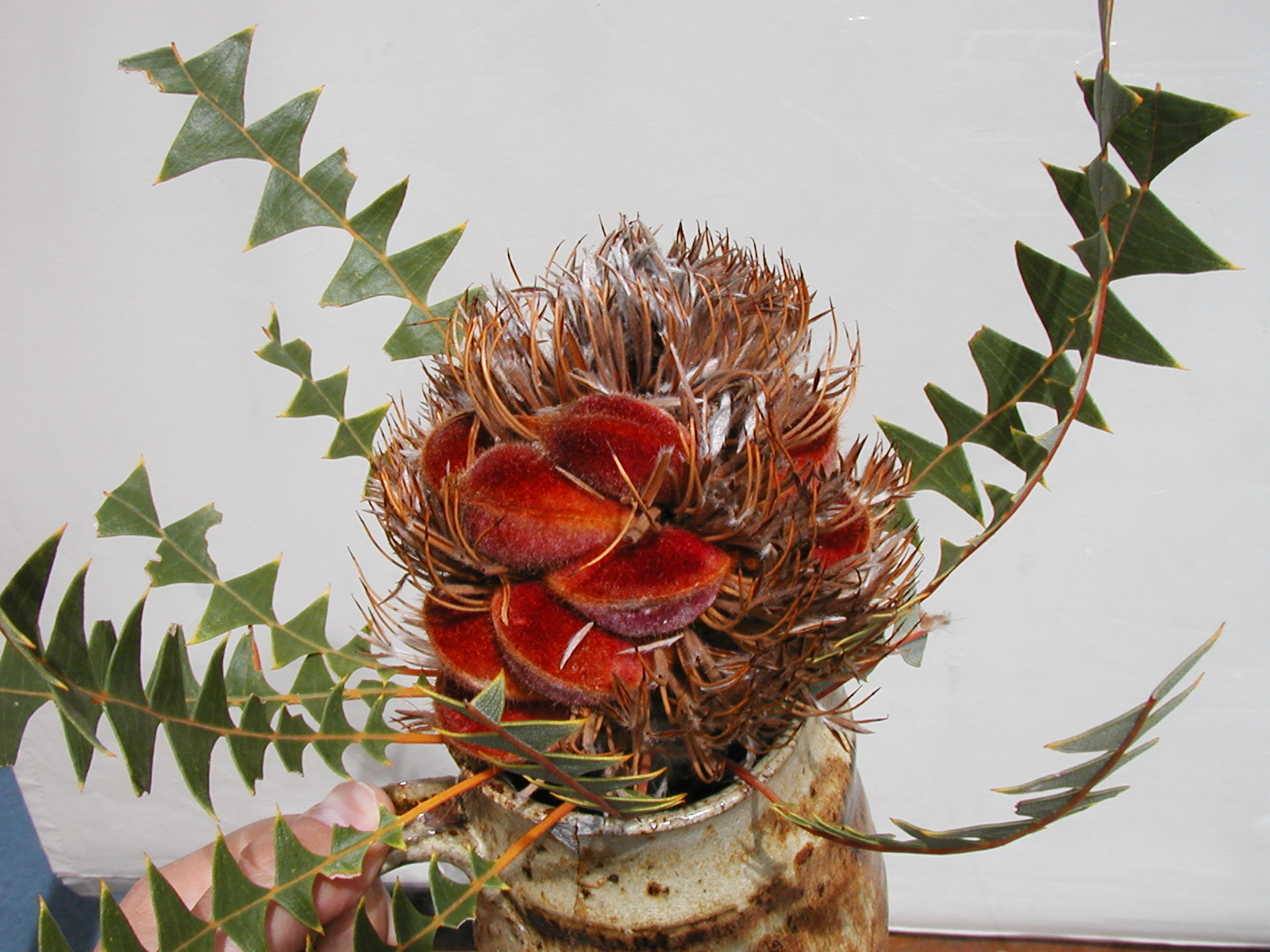
Follicles

Banksia baxteri, commonly known as Baxter's banksia or bird's nest banksia, is a species of shrub that is endemic to Western Australia. It has greyish brown bark, hairy stems, deeply serrated leaves with triangular lobes and lemon-yellow flowers in an oval flower spike that grows on the end of branches.

== Description ==
Banksia baxteri is an erect shrub that typically groups to a height of 1–5 m (3 ft 3 in – 16 ft 5 in) and that does not form a lignotuber. The branchlets and leaves are densely covered with woolly, white hairs when young. The leaves are wedge-shaped, 70–170 mm (2.8–6.7 in) long and 25–75 mm (0.98–2.95 in) wide in outline on a petiole 5–15 mm (0.20–0.59 in) long, divided to the midlobe with between four and seven triangular lobes on each side surrounded by V-shaped spaces. The flowers are arranged in a broad oval inflorescence 75–86 mm (3.0–3.4 in) wide on the ends of branches, the individual flowers lemon-yellow with a perianth 39–43 mm (1.5–1.7 in) long and the pistil 42–49 mm (1.7–1.9 in) long. Flowering occurs from December to May but mainly from January to March. Only a few follicles 35–42 mm (1.4–1.7 in) long, 17–22 mm (0.67–0.87 in) high and 15–20 mm (0.59–0.79 in) wide develop surrounded by the old flowers.

== Taxonomy and naming ==
Banksia baxteri was first formally described in 1830 by Robert Brown in the supplement to his Prodromus. The type specimens were collected by William Baxter in the mountains near King George Sound in 1829.

In 1891, Otto Kuntze, in his Revisio Generum Plantarum, rejected the generic name Banksia L.f., on the grounds that the name Banksia had previously been published in 1776 as Banksia J.R.Forst & G.Forst, referring to the genus now known as Pimelea. Kuntze proposed Sirmuellera as an alternative, referring to this species as Sirmuellera baxteri. This application of the principle of priority was largely ignored by Kuntze's contemporaries, and Banksia L.f. was formally conserved and Sirmuellera rejected in 1940.

== Distribution and habitat ==
Baxter's banksia grows with other shrubs such as Lambertia inermis, usually in deep sand and mostly occurs within 50 km (31 mi) of the coast between East Mount Barren and Israelite Bay.

== Conservation status ==
This banksia is classified as "not threatened" by the Western Australian Government Department of Parks and Wildlife.

== Ecology ==
A 1980 field study at Cheyne Beach showed it to be pollinated by the New Holland honeyeater and white-cheeked honeyeater.

Banksia baxteri is serotinous, that is, it has an aerial seed bank in its canopy in the form of the follicles of the old flower spikes. These are opened with fire and release seed in large numbers, which germinate and grow after rain. Seed can last for many years; old spikes 9 to 12 years old have been found to have seed that remains 100% viable.

== Use in horticulture ==
Seeds do not require any treatment, and take 21 to 42 days to germinate.
