= Pauline Ladiges =

Australian botanist

Professor Pauline Yvonne Ladiges
- Education: University of Melbourne
- Awards: AO, FAA
- Scientific career
- Fields: Plant ecology, taxonomy
- Workplaces: University of Melbourne

Pauline Yvonne Ladiges AO FAA (born 1948) is a botanist whose contributions have been significant both in building the field of taxonomy, ecology and historical biogeography of Australian plants, particularly Eucalypts and flora, and in science education at all levels. She is professorial fellow in the School of Botany at the University of Melbourne, where she has previously held a personal chair and was head of the School of Botany at the University of Melbourne from 1992 to 2010. She has been a fellow of the Australian Academy of Science since 2002. The standard author abbreviation Ladiges is used to indicate this person as the author when citing a botanical name.

== Early life and education ==
Pauline Yvonne Ladiges was born in Bolton, England in 1948.

She was educated at the University of Melbourne, completing a Diploma of Education in 1971 and a Master of Science the following year for her thesis, "A population study of Eucalyptus viminalis". In 1976 she graduated with a PhD from the same university for her thesis, "Studies of population differentiation in Eucalyptus viminalis Labill., in relation to mineral nutrition and drought resistance".

== Career ==
Pauline Ladiges began her career as a plant ecologist, and continued with this work from 1974 to 1983.

The next phase of her work was in phylogenetic systematics and historical biogeography. Eucalyptus are found in many different environments across Australia, and have a long and complex evolutionary history. Pauline Ladiges was the first to use advanced methodologies to define the relationships between the major groups of Eucalyptus, particularly by employing these two techniques:

1. cladistic analyses of taxonomic series
2. molecular techniques for estimating relationships between and among genera.

The education of students in science at secondary and tertiary levels has been supported by her work throughout her career. At the same time as she was completing her Master of Science at the University of Melbourne, she undertook a Diploma in Education, and served her first year as a bonded teacher in a secondment to a Teacher's College. She has taught and supervised a very large number of postgraduate students throughout her career.

As head of the School of Botany at the University of Melbourne she worked to address the deficit of skilled taxonomists in Australia by creating links with an important user of botanical knowledge, the Royal Botanic Gardens, Melbourne, an initiative acknowledged with a commendation in the inaugural Vice-Chancellor's Knowledge Transfer Awards. (She is deputy chair of the Royal Botanic Gardens and served as a board member for 14 years.)

== Awards ==
- 2001: Centenary Medal "for service to Australian society and science in the biogeography and ecology of Australian plants"
- 2002: Elected Fellow of the Australian Academy of Science (FAA)
- 2005: Royal Society of Victoria 2005 Research Medal (biological sciences, nonhuman); Award for Excellence in Australian Publishing, Single Title Category
- 2009: Officer of the Order of Australia (AO), "for service to the advancement of botanical science and research in the field of taxonomy and plant systematics, and to the conservation of Australian flora and fauna"
- 2011: Nancy T. Burbidge Medal, Australasian Systematic Botany Society (This award is presented annually for outstanding contribution to taxonomic and systematic botanical work in Australia.)
- 2020: Elected Fellow of the Royal Society of Victoria (FRSV)

== Publications (selected) ==
=== Educational texts ===
- Biology: an Australian focus / Pauline Ladiges, University of Melbourne, Barbara Evans, University of British Columbia, Robert Saint, University of Melbourne and Bruce Knox. 4th ed. North Ryde, N.S.W.: McGraw-Hill, 2010
- Evans, B. K., Ladiges, P., McKenzie, J., & Sanders, Y. (2005). Heinemann Biology 1. Port Melbourne: Pearson.
- Biology two: survival mechanisms, continuity and change / Barbara K. Evans, Pauline Y. Ladiges, John A. McKenzie. Barbara K. Evans. 2nd ed. Reprinted with corrections. Port Melbourne: Heinemann Educational Australia, 1995

== See also ==
- Thiele and Ladiges' taxonomic arrangement of Banksia
