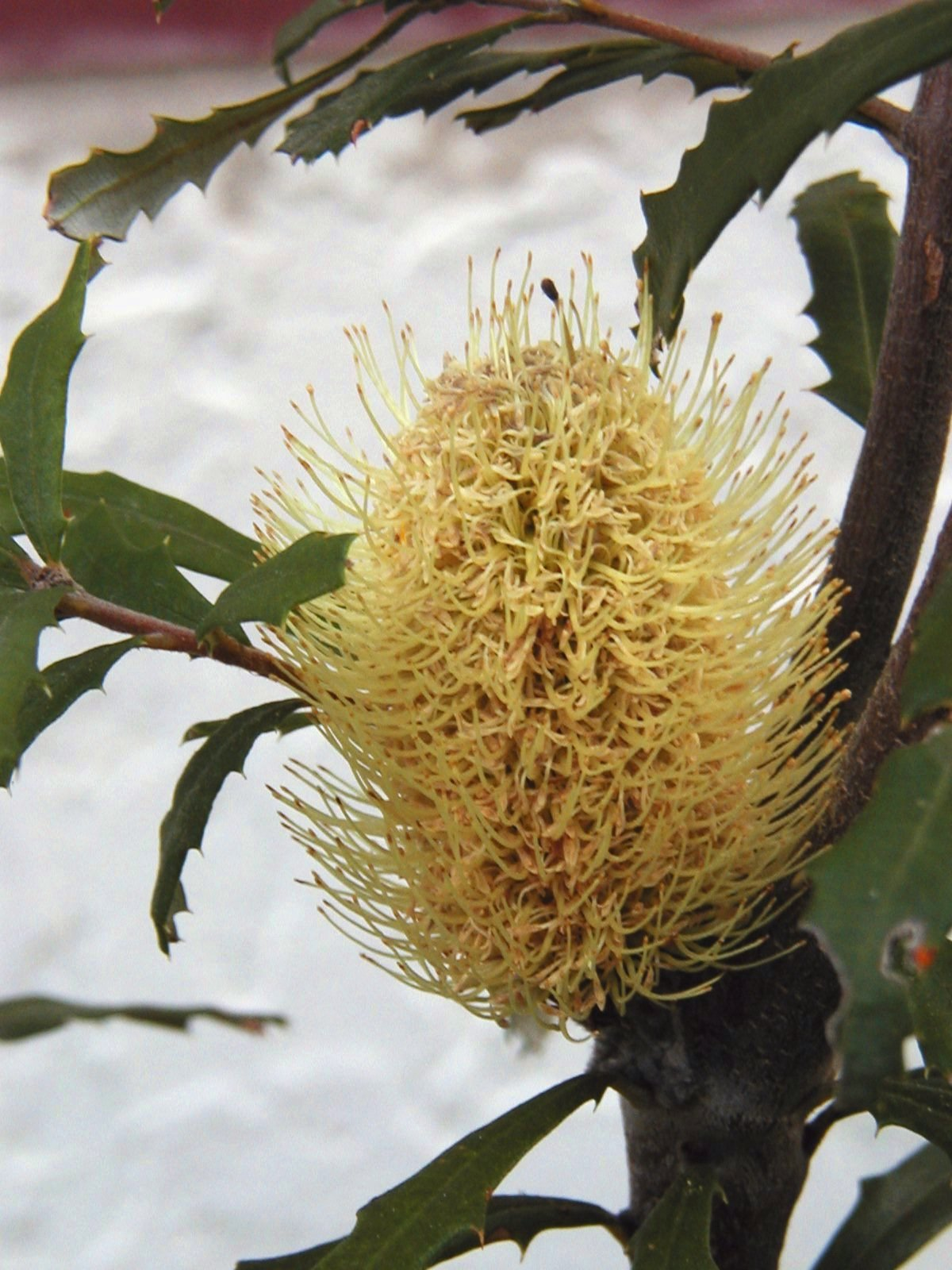
- Banksia canei inflorescence

Conservation status
- Least Concern (IUCN 3.1)

Scientific classification
- Kingdom: Plantae
- Clade: Tracheophytes
- Clade: Angiosperms
- Clade: Eudicots
- Order: Proteales
- Family: Proteaceae
- Genus: Banksia
- Species: B. canei

Binomial name
- Banksia canei J.H.Willis
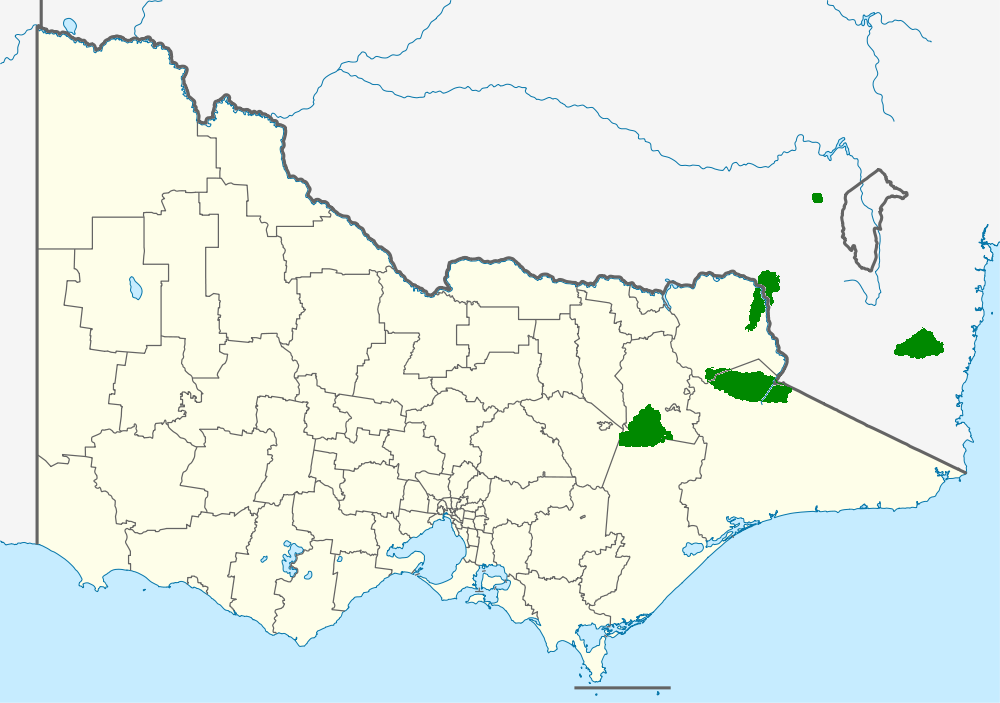
- Distribution of Banksia canei within New South Wales and Victoria, Australia

= Banksia canei =

Mountain banksia

Shrub species endemic to Australia

Banksia canei, commonly known as the mountain banksia, is a species of shrub that is endemic to southeastern Australia. It is generally encountered as a many-branched shrub that grows up to 3 m (10 ft) high, with narrow leaves and the yellow inflorescences (flower spikes) appearing from late summer to early winter. The old flowers fall off the spikes and up to 150 finely furred follicles develop, which remain closed until burnt in a bushfire. Each follicle bears two winged seeds. Response to fire is poorly known, although it is thought to regenerate by seed. Birds such as the yellow-tufted honeyeater and various insects forage among the flower spikes. It is frost tolerant in cultivation, but copes less well with aridity or humidity and is often short-lived in gardens. One cultivar, Banksia 'Celia Rosser', was registered in 1978, but has subsequently vanished.

Although no subspecies are recognised, four topodemes (geographically isolated populations) have been described, as there is significant variation in the shape of both adult and juvenile leaves between populations. Although superficially resembling B. marginata, it is more closely related to another subalpine species, B. saxicola.

== Description ==
Banksia canei grows as a woody shrub to 3 m (10 ft) in height, usually with many branches. Its bark is smooth with horizontal lenticels, initially reddish-brown before fading to grey tones. The stiff leaves are arranged alternately along the stems and show significant variation in shape and size. Adult leaves are linear or narrowly obovate in shape, and generally measure 2–5 cm (0.8–2.0 in), though some populations have leaves as short as 1 cm (0.39 in) or as long as 10 cm (3.9 in). The juvenile leaves are generally larger and wider with dentate margins. New growth is seen mainly from February to April. The complex flower spikes, known as inflorescences, appear between December and May, peaking over February to April. They arise from nodes of 1–3-year-old branchlets or can be terminal. Cylindrical in shape, they are composed of a central woody spike, from which a large number of compact floral units arise perpendicularly to it. They are generally 5–10 cm (2.0–3.9 in) high and 3–5 cm (1.2–2.0 in) wide, but some do reach 15 cm (5.9 in) high. Mauve-tinted in bud, they generally open to become pale yellow in colour. As with most banksias, anthesis is acropetal; the opening of the individual buds proceeds up the flower spike from the base to the top. The flower limbs may be pale grey or blue-tinged, while the styles are yellow. As the inflorescences age, the old flowers fall away, leaving a naked spike. Up to 150 follicles develop, each covered in short fine fur which is initially pale brown but fades to green-grey and partly wears away. More or less elliptic in shape, they measure 12–18 mm (0.47–0.71 in) long, 3–8 mm (0.12–0.31 in) high, and 4–9 mm (0.16–0.35 in) wide, and mostly remain closed until burnt by fire, although a few may open after several years. They contain two fertile seeds each, between which lies a woody dark brown separator of similar shape to the seeds. Measuring 13–18 mm (0.5–0.7 in) in length, the seed is obovate and composed of a dark brown 8–11 mm (0.3–0.4 in)-wide membranous 'wing' and crescent-shaped (lunate) seed proper which measures 6–8 mm (0.2–0.3 in) long by 2.5–4 mm (0.1–0.2 in) wide. The seed surface can be smooth or covered in tiny ridges, and often glistens. The resulting seedling first grows two obovate cotyledon leaves, which may remain for several months as several more leaves appear.

== Taxonomy ==
Banksia canei was first described in 1967 by James H. Willis, who had collected it on 27 November 1962 along the Mt. Seldom Seen track in the vicinity of Wulgulmerang, Victoria. Earlier collections include a specimen Ferdinand von Mueller had collected near Omeo in 1853, and one found by Richard Hind Cambage in 1908 near Kydra Peak. However, neither botanist considered this to be a new species at the time, instead holding it to be an unusual mountain form of the locally widespread B. marginata. Willis named the species after Victorian plantsman Bill Cane who had alerted authorities to the existence of an unusual banksia that was distinct from B. marginata some years previously. At the time, a plant collected from Mount Fulton near Port Davey in South West Tasmania was thought to be B. canei, but it was later reassessed as B. marginata. B. canei can be distinguished by its larger follicles and sharp points to the leaves. In his 1981 monograph of the genus Banksia, Alex George noted that despite a superficial resemblance to B. marginata, its bare old cones and stouter foliage indicated a closer relationship to B. integrifolia and B. saxicola, although it lacks the latter species' whorled leaf arrangement. A fossil species, B. kingii from the late Pleistocene of Melaleuca Inlet in southwestern Tasmania, has robust foliage and infructescence resembling those of B. canei and B. saxicola, and appears to be a recently extinct relative. The leaf of a much older fossil species Banksieaephyllum acuminatum from Oligocene deposits in the Latrobe Valley closely resembles B. canei in shape, anatomy and vein pattern.

The current taxonomic arrangement of the genus Banksia is based on botanist Alex George's 1999 monograph for the Flora of Australia book series. In this arrangement, B. canei is placed in Banksia subgenus Banksia, because its inflorescences take the form of Banksia's characteristic flower spikes; section Banksia because of its straight styles; and series Salicinae because its inflorescences are cylindrical. Kevin Thiele placed it in a subseries Integrifoliae, where he found strong support for it and B. saxicola to be each other's closest relative. The two were a sister group (i.e. next closest relative) to the four then-recognised subspecies of B. integrifolia. The subseries all bear whorled leaves apart from B. canei and B. aquilonia. However, this subgrouping of the Salicinae was not supported by George. He did place the two subalpine taxa (B. canei and B. saxicola) at the end of the sequence as he thought they were the most recently evolved species, since he considered the group to have a tropical origin and B. dentata to be the oldest lineage.

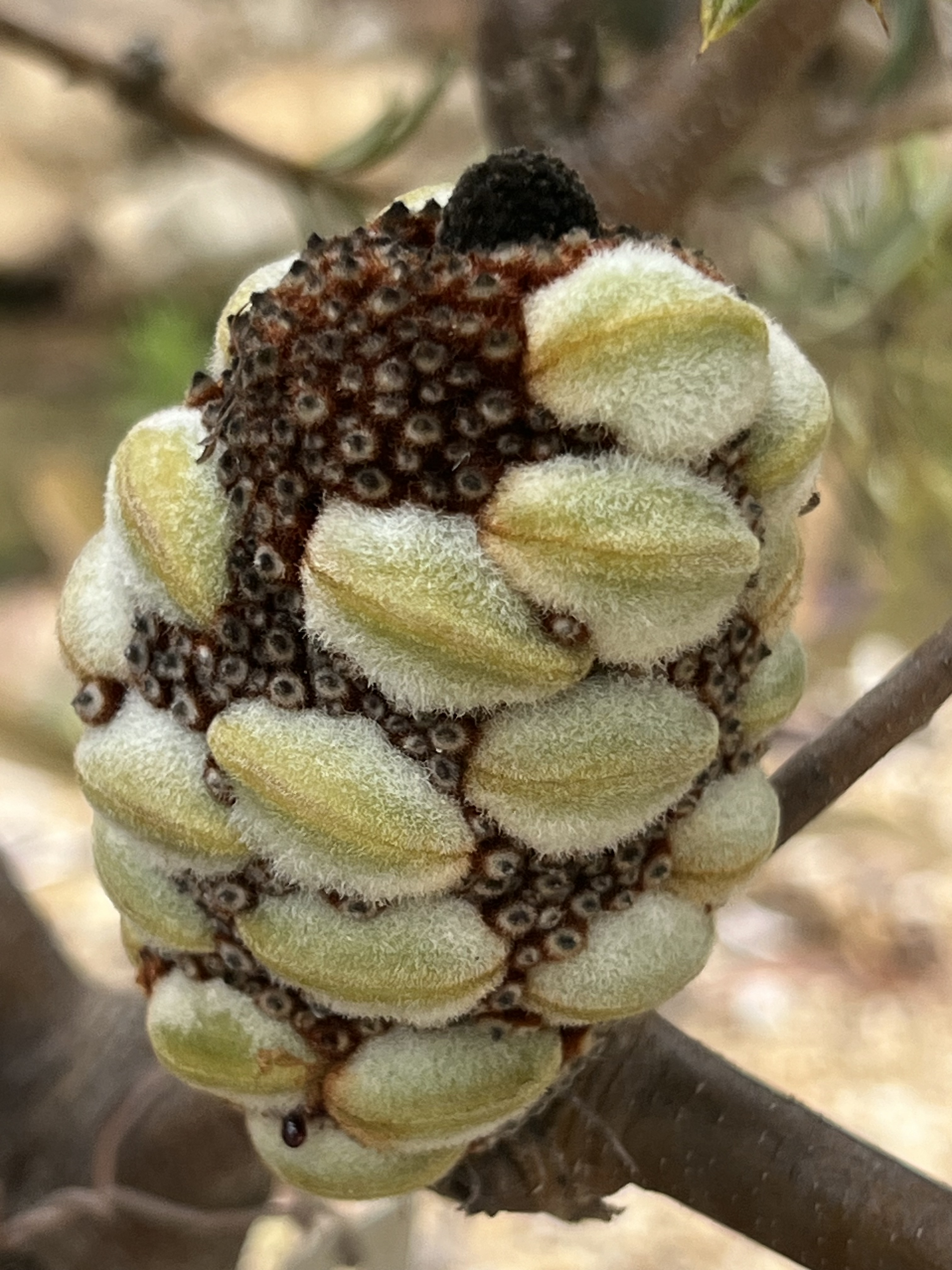
Furry follicles

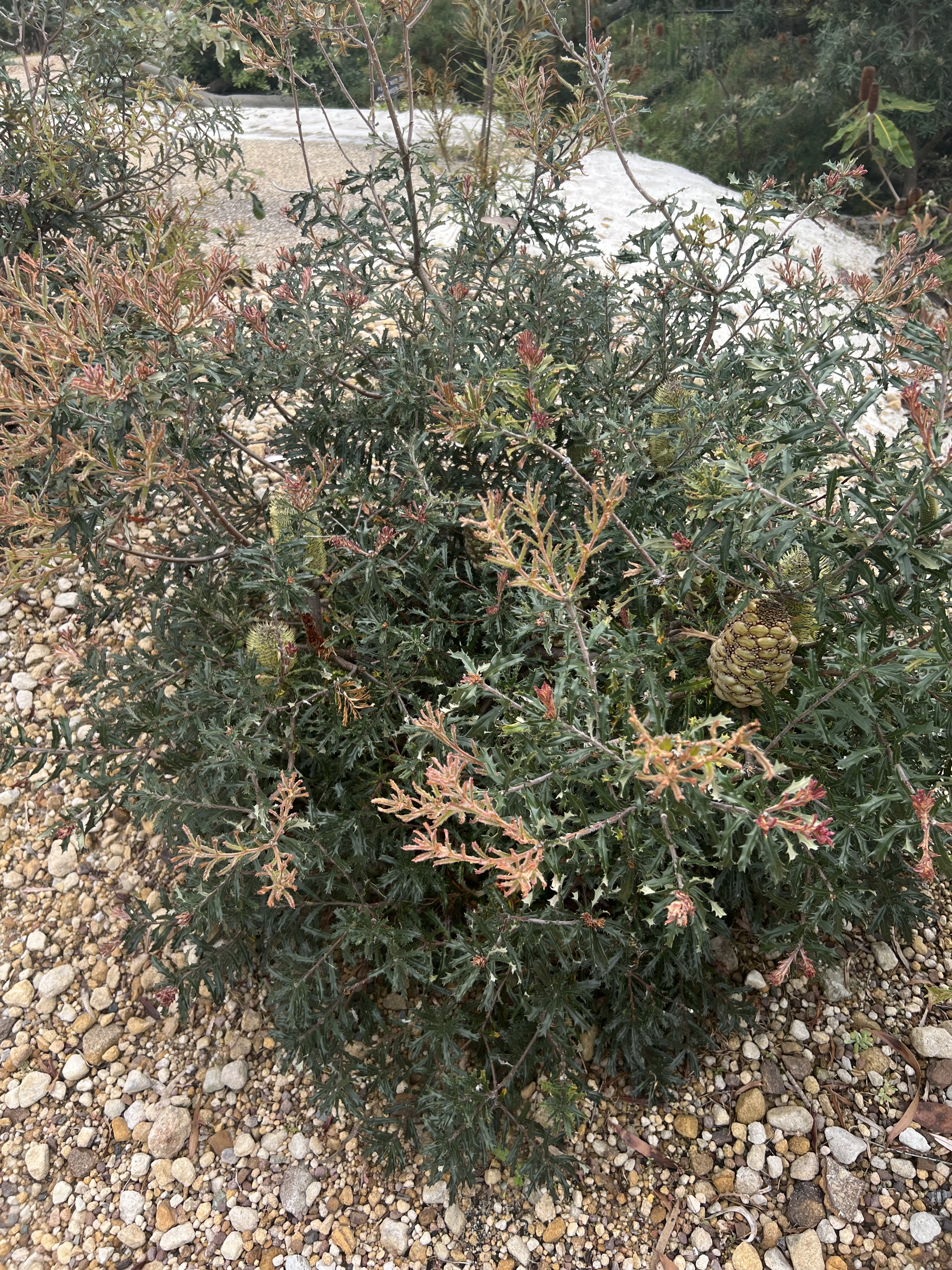
Habit

B. canei's placement within Banksia may be summarised as follows:

Genus Banksia

Subgenus Isostylis
Subgenus Banksia

Section Oncostylis
Section Coccinea
Section Banksia

Series Grandes
Series Banksia
Series Crocinae
Series Prostratae
Series Cyrtostylis
Series Tetragonae
Series Bauerinae
Series Quercinae
Series Salicinae

B. dentata – B. aquilonia – B. integrifolia – B. plagiocarpa – B. oblongifolia – B. robur – B. conferta – B. paludosa – B. marginata – B. canei – B. saxicola

Since 1998, American botanist Austin Mast and co-authors have been publishing results of ongoing cladistic analyses of DNA sequence data for the subtribe Banksiinae, which then comprised genera Banksia and Dryandra. Their analyses suggest a phylogeny that differs greatly from George's taxonomic arrangement. Banksia canei resolves as an early offshoot within the series Salicinae. Early in 2007, Mast and Thiele rearranged the genus Banksia by merging Dryandra into it, and published B. subg. Spathulatae for the taxa having spoon-shaped cotyledons; thus B. subg. Banksia was redefined as encompassing taxa lacking spoon-shaped cotyledons. They foreshadowed publishing a full arrangement once DNA sampling of Dryandra was complete; in the meantime, if Mast and Thiele's nomenclatural changes are taken as an interim arrangement, then B. canei is placed in B. subg. Spathulatae.

== Distribution and habitat ==
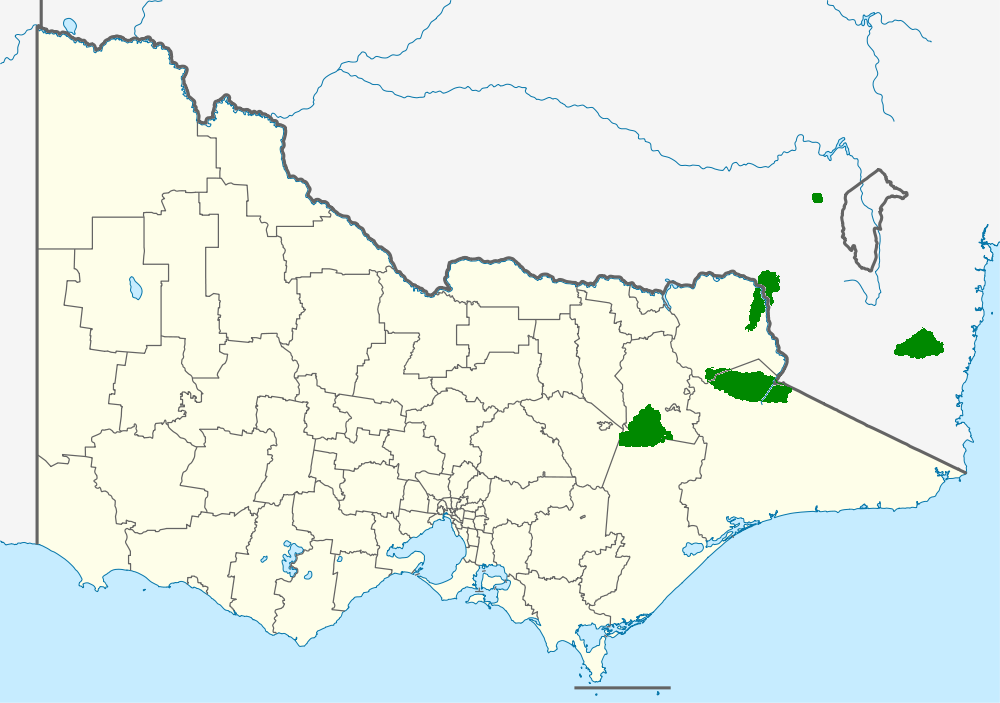
Distribution of Banksia canei across Victoria and far southeastern New South Wales

Several disjunct populations of Banksia canei have been recorded across alpine areas of southeastern Australia, generally at altitudes of 500 to 1,000 m (1,600 to 3,300 ft) in northeastern Victoria and southeastern New South Wales. One outlier at a lower altitude has been found on land partly cleared for agriculture at 250 m (820 ft) elevation at Yowrie. The species is listed as "Rare in Victoria" on the Department of Sustainability and Environment's Advisory List of Rare Or Threatened Plants In Victoria. In a 1978 paper reviewing the species, Alf Salkin coined the term topodeme to indicate a geographically isolated population of plants, derived from the Ancient Greek words topos "place" and deme "people" or "county (population)". Salkin described four populations (topodemes), each found in granite-based rocky soils in subalpine regions, and isolated from one another by wide river valleys. They would have occupied lower altitudes at cooler geological periods and higher altitudes in warmer times. Each of the main four populations varies from the others in their leaf morphology. Salkin observed that as the habitat and environment was similar across the range, the differences were secondary to genetic drift, as certain traits have begun to dominate over others by chance as the populations begin to diverge genetically.

Most populations are located south or east of the Great Dividing Range, the exception being the Snowy Mountains population. The Kybean Range population is contiguous, while the others are fragmented. From west to east the populations are:

- The Wellington River form, in the Snowy Range from Mount Howitt southwards to an area between the Moroka and Barkly Rivers. The Wonnangatta Mitchell system separates this form from the Wulgulmerang form to the east. The margins of the adult leaves are prominently dentate (toothed), much more so than other forms which may have occasional 'teeth' here and there. The flower has a distinctive blue-grey limb.
- The Snowy Mountains form, found to the north of the Snowy Mountains and west of the Australian Capital Territory, Talbingo and Corryong in the Bogong Peaks. This is separated by the Murray River to the south. This form has the smallest infructescences, measuring 6–8 cm (2.4–3.1 in) high and 3.5–4 cm (1.4–1.6 in) wide. The adult leaves are 10 cm (3.9 in) long, while the flowers are small, with perianths only 1.6 cm (0.63 in) long. Like those of the Wellington River form, the flower limbs are blue-grey.
- The Wulgulmerang form, located to the north and east of Omeo, to Wulgulmerang and the Little River. The flower limb is a more yellow-brown and the infructescences resemble those of B. marginata. It is found among granite rocks in association with the candlebark (Eucalyptus rubida).
- The Kybean Range form, in southeastern New South Wales – located in the Kybean Range and Tuross River east of Cooma. The Snowy River separates this form from the Wulgulmerang form to the west. This form has the largest flower spikes and infructescences, measuring up to 14 cm (5.5 in) high and 6 cm (2.4 in) wide. It has very short adult leaves, yet wide juvenile leaves that resemble Banksia integrifolia.

There is one report of naturalisation in Western Australia, near Jerramungup, on a road verge.

== Ecology ==
Banksia flower spikes are important sources of nectar for mammals, insects and birds, particularly honeyeaters. Animals recorded foraging among the flower spikes of B. canei include the yellow-tufted honeyeater (Lichenostomus melanops), bees, wasps and ants.

Banksia canei lacks a lignotuber and appears to regenerate from bushfire by seed, although its response to fire has been little studied. The follicles remain closed until burnt, although some do open spontaneously after five years or so. The fungus Banksiamyces toomansis, of the order Helotiales, infects older cones and seed, and hence seed older than about five years is often not viable. Plectronidium australiense is a species of anamorphic fungus that was recovered from a dead branch of B. canei at Healesville Sanctuary and described in 1986.

== Use in horticulture ==
Banksia canei is somewhat slow-growing in cultivation, and takes around five to seven years to flower from seed. Its furry-follicled fruiting cones are attractive, although generally obscured by foliage. Although grown successfully in England and tolerant of temperatures to −12 °C (10 °F), Banksia canei has a reputation of being difficult to keep alive in Australian gardens. Plants often grow well as seedlings in pots, but perish once planted in the ground. The species is tolerant to frost, but not to aridity or possibly more humid conditions. The species prefers a sunny aspect and fair drainage. It has been grown in inland New South Wales on the Southern Tablelands and Rylstone. Banksia canei seed requires stratification – storing at 5 °C (41 °F) for 60 days – before it germinates, which takes a further 6 to 25 days. Salkin proposed this was necessary so that seed released in a summer or autumn bushfire would lie dormant over the winter months before germinating in the spring. Banksia saxicola and some Banksia marginata seeds of subalpine provenance also share this trait.

In 1975, as part of a study on the four populations of B. canei, Salkin carried out germination experiments, producing around a thousand seedlings. In January that year, two seedlings from the Wulgulmerang population displayed deeply lobed (pinnatisect) leaves and a prostrate habit. One died, but in April two seedlings from the Wellington River seed appeared which bore the same appearance. Both these younger seedlings died, but the one older plant survived. It was propagated and registered as a cultivar Banksia 'Celia Rosser' on 28 May 1978, named in honour of Celia Rosser, an artist who has illustrated many banksias. It produced flower spikes 4 cm (1.6 in) high and 4 cm (1.6 in) wide, which made up for their small size by their abundance. Salkin felt its importance lay not in its horticultural potential but in its appearance in two geographically distant populations. He felt it represented the reappearance of an earlier (possibly ancestral) form, representing "allelomorphs all but lost". However, the cultivar has since vanished.
