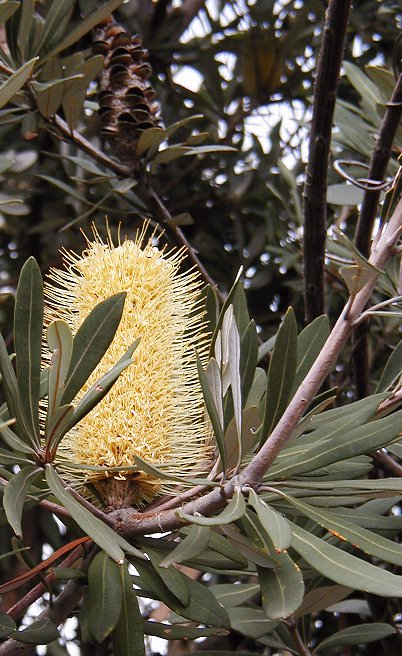
- B. integrifolia (coast banksia), the type species of B. ser. Salicinae

Scientific classification
- Kingdom: Plantae
- Clade: Tracheophytes
- Clade: Angiosperms
- Clade: Eudicots
- Order: Proteales
- Family: Proteaceae
- Genus: Banksia
- Section: Banksia sect. Banksia
- Series: Banksia ser. Salicinae; Meisn.

= Banksia ser. Salicinae =

Taxonomic series of Australian plants

Banksia ser. Salicinae is a valid botanic name for a series of Banksia. First published by Carl Meissner in 1856, the name has had three circumscriptions.

== Systematics ==
=== According to Meissner ===
B. ser. Salicinae was first published in 1856, in Carl Meissner's chapter on the Proteaceae in A. P. de Candolle's Prodromus systematis naturalis regni vegetabilis. It was one of four series into which the subgenus Eubanksia was divided. These four series were defined in terms of leaf characters, with series Salicinae containing the species with linear, or nearly so, leaves with hoary grey undersides. As they were defined on leaf characters alone, all of Meissner's series were highly heterogeneous.

The placement and circumscription of B. ser. Salicinae in Meissner's arrangement may be summarised as follows:

Banksia

B. sect. Eubanksia

B. ser. Abietinae (8 species, 1 variety)
B. ser. Salicinae

B. cunninghamii (now B. spinulosa var. cunninghamii)
B. collina (now B. spinulosa var. collina)
B. occidentalis
B. littoralis
B. cylindrostachya (now B. attenuata)
B. lindleyana
B. marginata

B. marginata var. Cavanillesii (now B. marginata)
B. marginata var. microstachya (now B. marginata)
B. marginata var. humilis (now B. marginata)

B. depressa (now B. marginata)

B. depressa var. subintegra (now B. marginata)

B. patula (now B. marginata)
B. australis (now B. marginata)
B. Gunnii (now B. marginata)
B. insularis (now B. marginata)
B. integrifolia

B. integrifolia var. minor (now B. integrifolia subsp. integrifolia)
B. integrifolia var. major (now B. integrifolia subsp. integrifolia)
B. integrifolia var. dentata (now B. robur)

B. compar (now B. integrifolia subsp. compar)
B. paludosa
B. verticillata
B. media
B. attenuata
B. elatior (now B. aemula)
B. lævigata
B. Hookeriana
B. prionotes
B. Menziesii

B. ser. Quercinae (18 species, 2 varieties)
B. ser. Dryandroideae (8 species)

B. sect. Isostylis (1 species)

Meissner's arrangement was current until 1870, when George Bentham published his arrangement, discarding all four of Meissner's series.

=== According to George ===
In 1981, Alex George published a thorough revision of Banksia in his classic monograph The genus Banksia L.f. (Proteaceae). He reinstated B. ser. Salicinae, placing it within B. sect. Banksia, and defining it as containing only those species with entire, serrate or dentate leaves; a small pollen-presenter; and unbeaked follicles.

The placement and circumscription of B. ser. Abietinae in George's taxonomic arrangement of Banksia may be summarised as follows:

Banksia

B. subg. Banksia

B. sect. Banksia

B. ser. Salicinae

B. dentata
B. aquilonia
B. integrifolia

B. integrifolia subsp. integrifolia
B. integrifolia subsp. compar
B. integrifolia subsp. monticola

B. plagiocarpa
B. oblongifolia
B. robur
B. conferta

B. conferta subsp. conferta
B. conferta subsp. penicillata

B. paludosa

B. paludosa subsp. astrolux
B. paludosa subsp. paludosa

B. marginata
B. canei
B. saxicola

B. ser. Grandes (2 species)
B. ser. Banksia (8 species)
B. ser. Crocinae (4 species)
B. ser. Prostratae (6 species, 3 varieties)
B. ser. Cyrtostylis (13 species, 2 subspecies)
B. ser. Tetragonae (3 species)
B. ser. Bauerinae (1 species)
B. ser. Quercinae

B. quercifolia
B. oreophila

B. sect. Coccinea (1 species)
B. sect. Oncostylis (3 series, 22 species, 4 subspecies, 11 varieties)

B. subg. Isostylis (3 species)

In a later publication, George would refer to this series by the name B. ser. Banksiae, but this is probably a typographical error, as the name has not been validly published.

In 1991, the Tasmanian fossil taxon B. kingii was placed in this series.

=== According to Thiele and Ladiges ===
In 1996, Kevin Thiele and Pauline Ladiges undertook a cladistic analysis of morphological characters of Banksia, which yielded a phylogeny somewhat at odds with George's taxonomic arrangement. They found George's B. ser. Salicinae to be monophyletic, their cladogram placing it in a clade whose sister clade consisted of the members of George's B. ser. Quercinae and B. ser. Spicigerae:

- - B. ser. Quercinae (2 species)
  - B. ser. Spicigerae (7 species, 6 varieties)
- - - B. oblongifolia
    - - B. plagiocarpa
      - - B. dentata
        - B. robur
  - - B. marginata
    - - - B. conferta subsp. conferta
        - - B. conferta subsp. penicillata
          - B. paludosa
      - - - B. canei
          - B. saxicola
        - - B. integrifolia subsp. integrifolia
          - - B. integrifolia subsp. monticola
            - - B. integrifolia subsp. compar
              - B. integrifolia subsp. aquilonia (now B. aquilonia)

Thiele and Ladiges therefore retained George's B. ser. Salicinae, further dividing it into two subseries, B. subser. Acclives and B. subser. Integrifoliae, in accordance with the resolution of clades in their analysis. The placement and circumscription of B. ser. Abietinae in Thiele and Ladiges' arrangement may be summarised as follows:

Banksia

B. subg. Isostylis (3 species)
B. elegans (incertae sedis)
B. subg. Banksia

B. ser. Tetragonae (4 species)
B. ser. Lindleyanae (1 species)
B. ser. Banksia (2 subseries, 12 species)
B. baueri (incertae sedis)
B. lullfitzii (incertae sedis)
B. attenuata (incertae sedis)
B. ashbyi (incertae sedis)
B. coccinea (incertae sedis)
B. ser. Prostratae (8 species)
B. ser. Cyrtostylis (4 species)
B. ser. Ochraceae (3 species, 2 subspecies)
B. ser. Grandes (2 species)
B. ser. Salicinae

B. subser. Acclives

B. oblongifolia
B. plagiocarpa
B. robur
B. dentata

B. subser. Integrifoliae

B. marginata
B. conferta
B. penicillata (now B. conferta subsp. penicillata)
B. paludosa
B. canei
B. saxicola
B. integrifolia

B. integrifolia subsp. integrifolia
B. integrifolia subsp. monticola
B. integrifolia subsp. compar
B. integrifolia subsp. aquilonia (now B. aquilonia)

B. ser. Spicigerae (3 subseries, 7 species, 6 varieties)
B. ser. Quercinae (2 species)
B. ser. Dryandroideae (1 species)
Banksia ser. Abietinae (4 subseries, 15 species, 8 varieties)

Thiele and Ladiges' arrangement remained current only until 1999, when George's treatment of the genus for the Flora of Australia series of monographs was published. This was essentially a revision of George's 1981 arrangement, which took into account some of Thiele and Ladiges' data, but rejected their overall arrangement. With respect to B. ser. Abietinae, George's 1999 arrangement was fundamentally the same as his 1981, but differed in the ranking of some taxa, the inclusion of some newly published taxa, and changes to the phyletic order.

=== Recent developments ===
Since 1998, Austin Mast has been publishing results of ongoing cladistic analyses of DNA sequence data for the subtribe Banksiinae. His analyses suggest a phylogeny that is very greatly different from George's taxonomic arrangement, including finding Banksia to be paraphyletic with respect to Dryandra. Mast's analyses did not include either subspecies of B. conferta (Glasshouse Banksia), but otherwise found B. ser. Salicinae to be monophyletic. The clade is not very well resolved, however, having a number of polytomies:

- B. dentata
- - - B. oblongifolia
    - B. robur
  - B. plagiocarpa
  - B. integrifolia subsp. aquilonia (now B. aquilonia)
- - B. integrifolia subsp. integrifolia
  - B. integrifolia subsp. monticola
  - B. integrifolia subsp. compar
  - - B. marginata
    - B. saxicola
  - B. paludosa
- B. canei

Early in 2007 Mast and Thiele initiated a rearrangement of Banksia by transferring Dryandra into it, and publishing B. subg. Spathulatae for the species having spoon-shaped cotyledons; in this way they also redefined the autonym B. subg. Banksia as containing those taxa lacking spoon-shaped cotyledons. The members of B. ser. Quercinae fall within B. subg. Spathulatae, but no further details have been proffered. Mast and Thiele have foreshadowed publishing a full arrangement once DNA sampling of Dryandra is complete.

== Distribution ==
All but one species of B. ser. Salicinae are endemic to the east coast of Australia. The exception, B. dentata (tropical banksia), spreads across the north of Australia to the Kimberleys, and also occurs on New Guinea and the Aru Islands.

== Hybridization ==
Interbreeding in the wild has been reported between many members including:

- B. paludosa × B. integrifolia
- B. marginata × B. integrifolia
- B. robur × B. oblongifolia
- B. marginata × B. conferta subsp. penicillata
- B. conferta subsp. conferta × B. integrifolia
