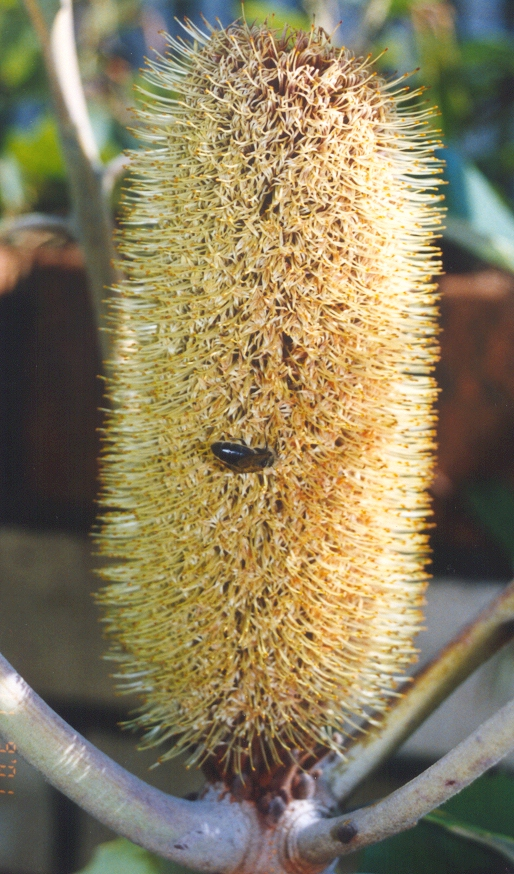

Conservation status
- Least Concern (IUCN 3.1)

Scientific classification
- Kingdom: Plantae
- Clade: Tracheophytes
- Clade: Angiosperms
- Clade: Eudicots
- Order: Proteales
- Family: Proteaceae
- Genus: Banksia
- Subgenus: Banksia subg. Banksia
- Section: Banksia sect. Banksia
- Series: Banksia ser. Salicinae
- Species: B. robur

Binomial name
- Banksia robur Cav.

Synonyms
- List: Banksia dilleniifolia Knight, 1809; Banksia fagifolia Hoffmanns,1826; Banksia latifolia R.Br.,1810; Banksia longifolia D.Don ex F.Dietr., 1802; Banksia macrophylla Link, 1821; Banksia mimosoides F.Dietr., 1802, nom. nud.; Banksia uncigera Knight, 1809; Sirmuellera robur (Cav.) Kuntze

= Banksia robur =

Swamp banksia

Species of shrub from eastern Australia

Banksia robur, commonly known as swamp banksia, is a species of flowering plant in the family Proteaceae. It grows in sand or peaty sand in coastal areas from Cooktown in north Queensland to the Illawarra region on the New South Wales south coast. It is often found in areas which are seasonally inundated. It grows as a multistemmed shrub to 3 m (10 ft) tall, with large, leathery tough green leaves with serrated margins up to 30 cm (12 in) long and 10 cm (4 in) wide. The new growth is colourful, in shades of red, maroon or brown with a dense felt-like covering of brown hairs.

Hybrids with its close relative, B. oblongifolia (fern-leaved banksia) can be sometimes found where both species occur (such as near Bulli in the Illawarra), with features intermediate between both species.

Although it was one of the original banksias collected by Joseph Banks around Botany Bay in 1770, it was not formally described until 1800 by Antonio José Cavanilles, with a type collection by Luis Née in 1793.

== Description ==
Banksia robur is a spreading shrub to 3 m (10 ft), though larger single-stemmed specimens to 5 m (16 ft) high have been recorded in Wooroi State Forest near Caloundra. The grey-brown stems are 1–3 cm (0.39–1.18 in) thick, with smooth bark. New branchlets are densely covered with rust-coloured fur that persists for 1–2 years; the upper tips of new growth have furry prophylls. Alternately arranged along the stem, the leaves are 12–30 cm (4.7–11.8 in) in length and 5–7 cm (2.0–2.8 in) in width, and oblong to obovate (egg-shaped) or elliptic in shape.

Plants from different areas seem to flower at different times, some in spring and summer, others predominantly in autumn. The large flower spikes, up to 15 centimetres (5.9 in) high and 5 to 6 centimetres (2.0 to 2.4 in) wide, are metallic green with pinkish styles in bud, becoming cream-yellow and fading to golden-brown in the golden stage. The old flowers turn grey and persist on old cones, concealing the small follicles. These follicles are reddish and furred when new, before fading. The plant is lignotuberous, regenerating from the ground after fire.

== Taxonomy ==
The first botanical collection of B. robur was made by Sir Joseph Banks and Dr Daniel Solander, naturalists on the Endeavour during Lieutenant (later Captain) James Cook's first voyage to the Pacific Ocean. Cook landed on Australian soil for the first time on 29 April 1770, at a place that he later named Botany Bay in recognition of "the great quantity of plants Mr Banks and Dr Solander found in this place". Over the next seven weeks, Banks and Solander collected thousands of plant specimens, including the first specimens of a new genus that would later be named Banksia in Banks' honour.

It is said that every specimen collected during the Endeavour voyage was sketched by Banks' botanical illustrator Sydney Parkinson, but no such painting of B. robur is extant. On the Endeavour's return to England in July 1771, Banks' specimens became part of his London herbarium, and artists were employed to paint watercolours from Parkinson's sketches. Banks had plans to publish his entire collection as Banks' Florilegium, but for various reasons the project was never completed, and it would be ten years before any of the Banksia species were formally published.

Despite being one of the first four Banksia species collected, the single specimen of B. robur was somehow overlooked and not described by Carolus Linnaeus the Younger in 1782. Specimens of the species were collected again in 1793 by Luis Née around Port Jackson (Sydney) and Botany Bay, and it was on the basis of these specimens that it was described and named in 1800 by Antonio José Cavanilles. Describing it as a tree, Cavanilles gave it the species epithet robur; meaning "strength" or "hard wood", the epithet was assumed by botanist Alex George to relate to the mistaken belief it was a tree. The name could also refer to a resemblance of the wood or leaves to the English oak (Quercus robur).

The gardener Joseph Knight published On the cultivation of the plants belonging to the natural order of Proteeae in 1809, within which he described Banksia uncigera from the Duke of Northumberland's collection at Syon House, and B. dilleniæfolia "Dillenia-leaved banksia", reporting that seeds of the latter had recently arrived in England. Knight equated the former with Banksia oblongifolia and the latter with B. robur.

Robert Brown renamed B. robur as B. latifolia in 1810, clarifying that he was forced to change the name as the plant grew as a low shrub not a tall tree. The same year, Brown recorded 31 species of Banksia in his 1810 work Prodromus Florae Novae Hollandiae et Insulae Van Diemen, and stuck with the epithet latifolia in his taxonomic arrangement, placing the taxon in the subgenus Banksia verae, the "True Banksias", because the inflorescence is a typical Banksia flower spike. He classed B. dilleniæfolia, B. uncigera and B. robur as taxonomic synonyms. German botanist Johann Heinrich Friedrich Link catalogued B. latifolia and described B. macrophylla from cultivated material in the Berlin Botanic Gardens in his 1821 work Enumeratio plantarum Horti regii botanici berolinensis altera; B. fagifolia was described by Johann Centurius Hoffmannsegg in 1826; these have been synonymised as B. robur.

By the time Carl Meissner published his 1856 arrangement of the genus, there were 58 described Banksia species. Meissner divided Brown's Banksia verae, which had been renamed Eubanksia by Stephan Endlicher in 1847, into four series based on leaf properties. He followed Brown in using the name B. latifolia, and placed it in the series Quercinae. Meissner also named a specimen of B. robur as B. integrifolia var. dentata.

In 1870, George Bentham published a thorough revision of Banksia in his landmark publication Flora Australiensis. In Bentham's arrangement, the number of recognised Banksia species was reduced from 60 to 46. He defined four sections based on leaf, style and pollen-presenter characters, placing B. latifolia in section Orthostylis, though noting it had the flowers and style of Eubanksia.

In 1891, Otto Kuntze, in his Revisio Generum Plantarum, rejected the generic name Banksia L.f., on the grounds that the name Banksia had previously been published in 1776 as Banksia J.R.Forst & G.Forst, referring to the genus now known as Pimelea. Kuntze proposed Sirmuellera as an alternative, referring to this species as Sirmuellera robur. This application of the principle of priority was largely ignored, and Banksia L.f. was formally conserved and Sirmuellera rejected in 1940.

Common names include "swamp banksia", "eastern swamp banksia" and "broad-leaved banksia". Frederick Manson Bailey reported in 1913 that the indigenous people of Stradbroke Island knew it as bumbar.

=== Placement within Banksia ===
The current taxonomic arrangement of the genus Banksia is based on George's 1999 monograph for the Flora of Australia book series. In this arrangement, B. robur is placed in Banksia subgenus Banksia, because its inflorescences take the form of Banksia's characteristic flower spikes, section Banksia because of its straight styles, and series Salicinae because its inflorescences are cylindrical. In a morphological cladistic analysis published in 1994, Kevin Thiele placed it in the newly described subseries Acclives along with B. plagiocarpa, B. oblongifolia and B. dentata within the series Salicinae. However, this subgrouping of the Salicinae was not supported by George. B. oblongifolia's placement within Banksia may be summarised as follows:

Genus Banksia

Subgenus Isostylis
Subgenus Banksia

Section Oncostylis
Section Coccinea
Section Banksia

Series Grandes
Series Banksia
Series Crocinae
Series Prostratae
Series Cyrtostylis
Series Tetragonae
Series Bauerinae
Series Quercinae
Series Salicinae

B. dentata – B. aquilonia – B. integrifolia – B. plagiocarpa – B. oblongifolia – B. robur – B. conferta – B. paludosa – B. marginata – B. canei – B. saxicola

Since 1998, American botanist Austin Mast and co-authors have been publishing results of ongoing cladistic analyses of DNA sequence data for the subtribe Banksiinae, which then comprised genera Banksia and Dryandra. Their analyses suggest a phylogeny that differs greatly from George's taxonomic arrangement. Banksia robur resolves as the closest relative, or "sister", to B. oblongifolia, with B. plagiocarpa as next closest relative. In 2007, Mast and Thiele rearranged the genus Banksia by merging Dryandra into it, and published B. subg. Spathulatae for the taxa having spoon-shaped cotyledons; thus B. subg. Banksia was redefined as encompassing taxa lacking spoon-shaped cotyledons. They foreshadowed publishing a full arrangement once DNA sampling of Dryandra was complete; in the meantime, if Mast and Thiele's nomenclatural changes are taken as an interim arrangement, B. robur is placed in B. subg. Spathulatae.

=== Hybridization ===
Banksia robur and B. oblongifolia hybrids have been recorded at several locations along the eastern coastline of Australia. Field workers for The Banksia Atlas recorded 20 populations between Wollongong and Pialba in central Queensland. Locales include Calga north of Sydney, Ku-ring-gai Chase National Park, and Cordeaux Dam near Wollongong. A study of an area of extensive hybridization between the two near Darkes Forest on the Woronora Plateau south of Sydney revealed extensive hybridization in mixed species stands but almost none in pure stands of either species there. Genetic analysis showed generations of crossing and complex ancestry. Morphology generally correlated with genetic profile, but occasionally plants that resembled one parent had some degree of genetic hybridization. Furthermore, there were a few plants with morphology suggestive of a third species, B. paludosa, in their parentage, and requiring further investigation.

== Distribution and habitat ==
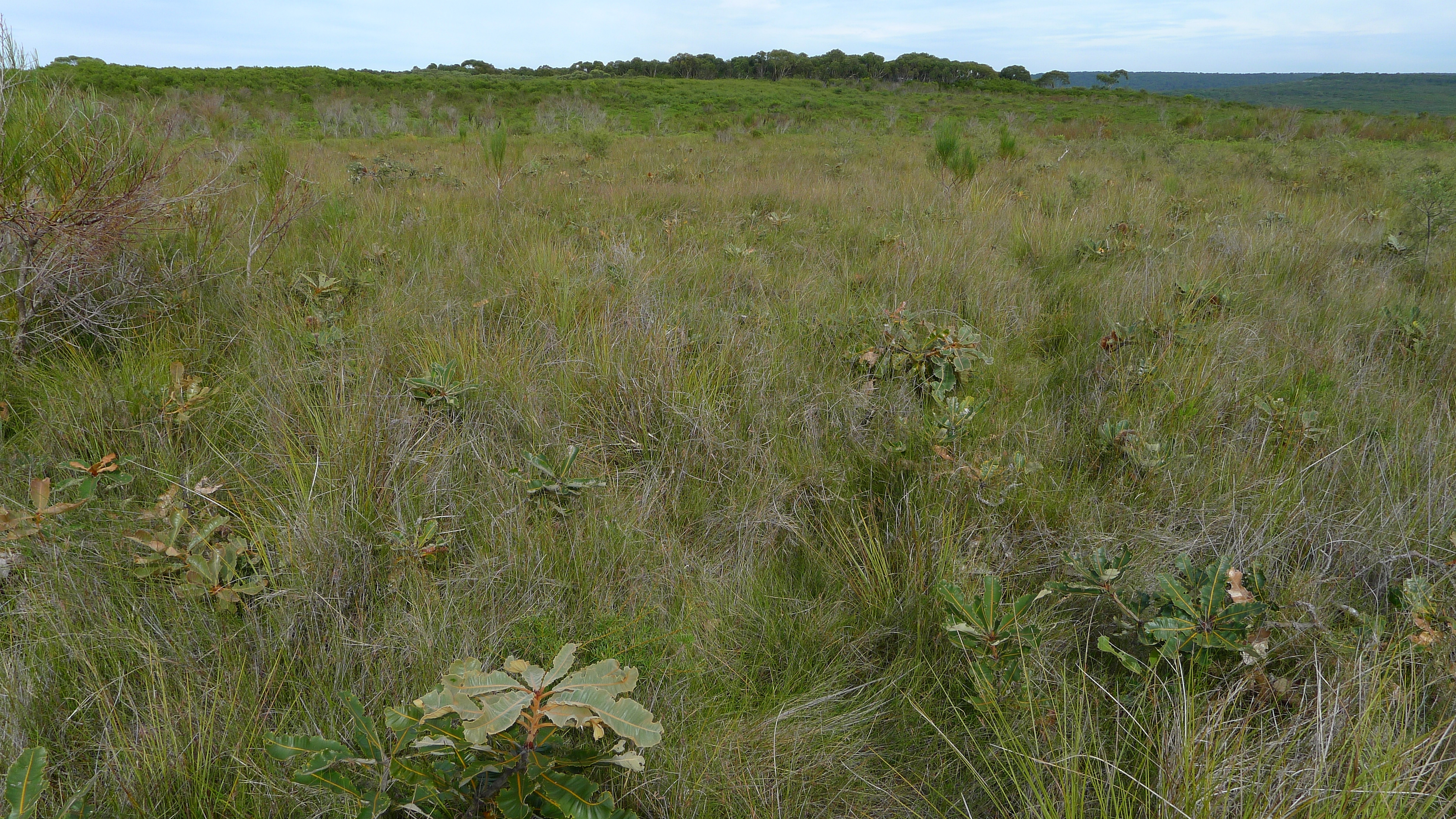
B. robur as an emergent plant in grassy heathland

Banksia robur is native to coastal eastern Australia, where it is found from New South Wales to north Queensland. The Banksia Atlas recorded it as occurring along two stretches of coastline: from Wollongong to South West Rocks in New South Wales, then from Brunswick Heads in northern New South Wales to Shoalwater Bay in Queensland (with a 200 km gap around Rockhampton), and isolated populations near Bowen, Julatten and Cooktown in north Queensland.

It is found in low-lying sandy or peaty soils that are often seasonally damp or periodically inundated. In the Sydney basin it is associated with heath flora such as pink swamp-heath (Sprengelia incarnata), coral fern (Gleichenia dicarpa), and Leptocarpus tenax.

== Ecology ==
Banksia robur plants can live for more than 60 years. They respond to bushfire by resprouting from buds located on the large woody lignotuber.

Like other banksias, B. robur plays host to a wide variety of pollinators, including insects such as butterflies, moths, bees, wasps, ants and jewel beetles, and many bird species. These include honeyeaters such as New Holland honeyeater (Phylidonyris novaehollandiae), little wattlebird (Anthochaera chrysoptera), brown honeyeater (Lichmera indistincta), tawny-crowned honeyeater (Gliciphila melanops), Lewin's honeyeater (Meliphaga lewinii), and little friarbird (Philemon citreogularis) - all recorded in the 1988 The Banksia Atlas survey.

== Cultivation ==
As B. robur naturally occurs in wet areas (hence the common name) on sandy soils, these make the best growing conditions. It appreciates a sunny aspect and extra water, especially when actively growing and during dry spells. Propagation from seed is reliable. Hardened pencil-thickness stems have been struck successfully as cuttings.
