= Plectronidium australiense =

Scientific classification
- Kingdom: Fungi
- Division: Ascomycota
- Class: incertae sedis
- Order: incertae sedis
- Family: incertae sedis
- Genus: Plectronidium
- Species: P. australiense

Binomial name
- Plectronidium australiense B.Sutton & Pascoe (1986)

Species of fungus

Plectronidium australiense is a species of fungus. Known only from Australia, where it grows on the dead branches of Banksia canei, it was described as new to science in 1986. Its conidia have a basal appendage and measure 19–26 by 1.5 μm—shorter and narrower than the similar species P. minor, P. sinense, or P. magnoliae.
