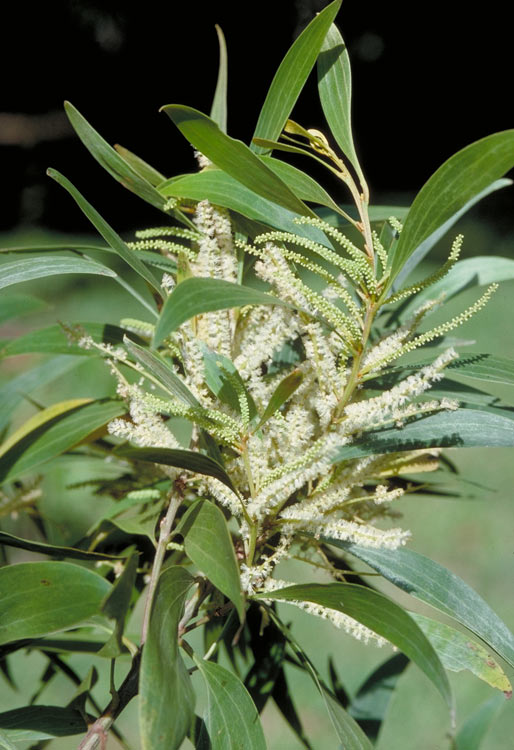
- Flowers

Scientific classification
- Kingdom: Plantae
- Clade: Tracheophytes
- Clade: Angiosperms
- Clade: Eudicots
- Clade: Rosids
- Order: Fabales
- Family: Fabaceae
- Subfamily: Caesalpinioideae
- Clade: Mimosoid clade
- Genus: Acacia
- Species: A. cincinnata

Binomial name
- Acacia cincinnata F.Muell.
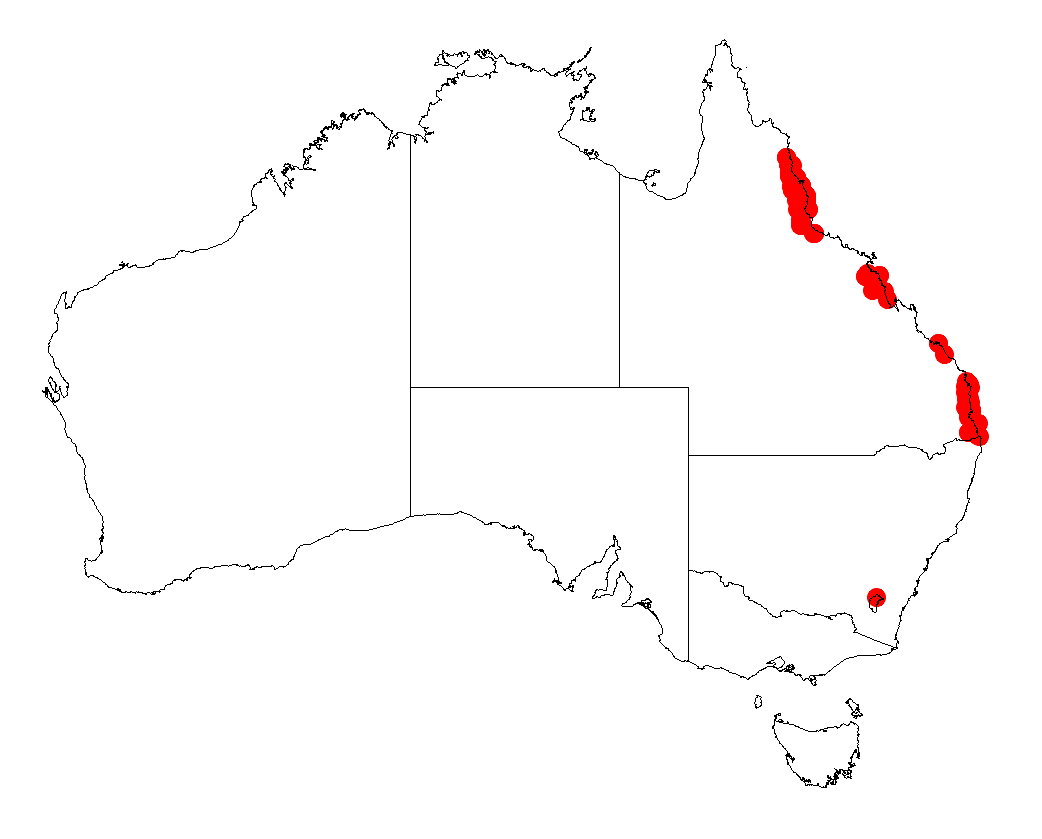
- Occurrence data from AVH

Synonyms
- Racosperma cincinnatum (F.Muell.) Pedley

= Acacia cincinnata =

Daintree wattle

Species of legume

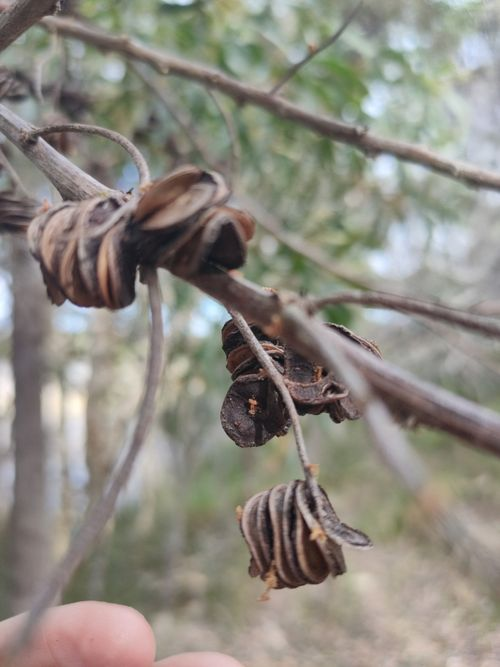
Fruit

Acacia cincinnata, commonly known as Daintree wattle or circle fruit salwood, is a species of flowering plant in the family Fabaceae and is endemic to Queensland, Australia. It is a large shrub or tree with furrowed flaky bark, hairy branchlets, very narrowly elliptic phyllodes, spikes of creamy yellow flowers and tightly, spirally coiled, leathery pods.

== Description ==
Acacia cincinnata is a large shrub or tree that typically grows to a height of 5–25 m (16–82 ft) and has been recorded with a dbh of 60 cm (24 in). It has furrowed, flaky dark grey to black bark. The branchlets are stout, angular, pale brownish grey and covered with soft hairs. The phyllodes very narrowly elliptic, 100–160 mm (3.9–6.3 in) long and 11–30 mm (0.43–1.18 in) wide, leathery and tapered at both ends with 3 main veins and a gland 2 mm (0.079 in) from the base of the phyllode. The flowers are borne in spikes 35–55 mm (1.4–2.2 in) long and are creamy yellow. Flowering occurs from May to June and the pods are elliptic to oblong, tightly spirally coiled, mostly 5–6 mm (0.20–0.24 in) wide, glabrous, leathery and covered with a white, powdery bloom. The seeds are black and 35–45 mm (1.4–1.8 in) long.

== Taxonomy ==
Acacia cincinnata was first formally described in 1878 by the botanist Ferdinand von Mueller in his Fragmenta Phytographiae Australiae from specimens collected by John Dallachy. The specific epithet (cincinnata) means 'possessing curled hair'.

== Distribution and habitat ==
This species of wattle is endemic to Queensland where it is found near the margins of rainforest in damper parts of the Atherton Tableland, the adjacent coast, the Eungella Range and the high rainfall areas between Maryborough and Brisbane, often in sandy soils over granite.

== See also ==
- List of Acacia species
