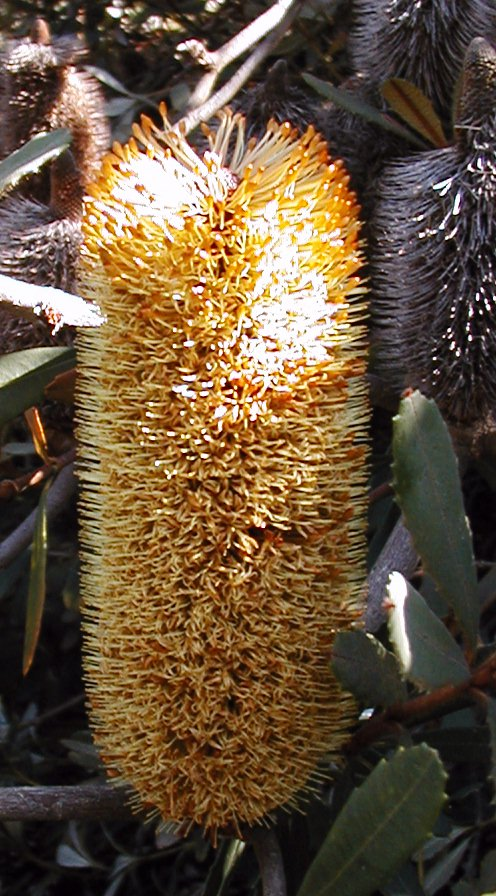
- Banksia penicillata in Maranoa Gardens

Scientific classification
- Kingdom: Plantae
- Clade: Tracheophytes
- Clade: Angiosperms
- Clade: Eudicots
- Order: Proteales
- Family: Proteaceae
- Genus: Banksia
- Species: B. penicillata

Binomial name
- Banksia penicillata (A.S.George) K.R.Thiele

Synonyms
- Banksia conferta subsp. penicillata (A.S.George) A.S.George; Banksia conferta var. penicillata A.S.George

= Banksia penicillata =

Species of shrub endemic to eastern Australia

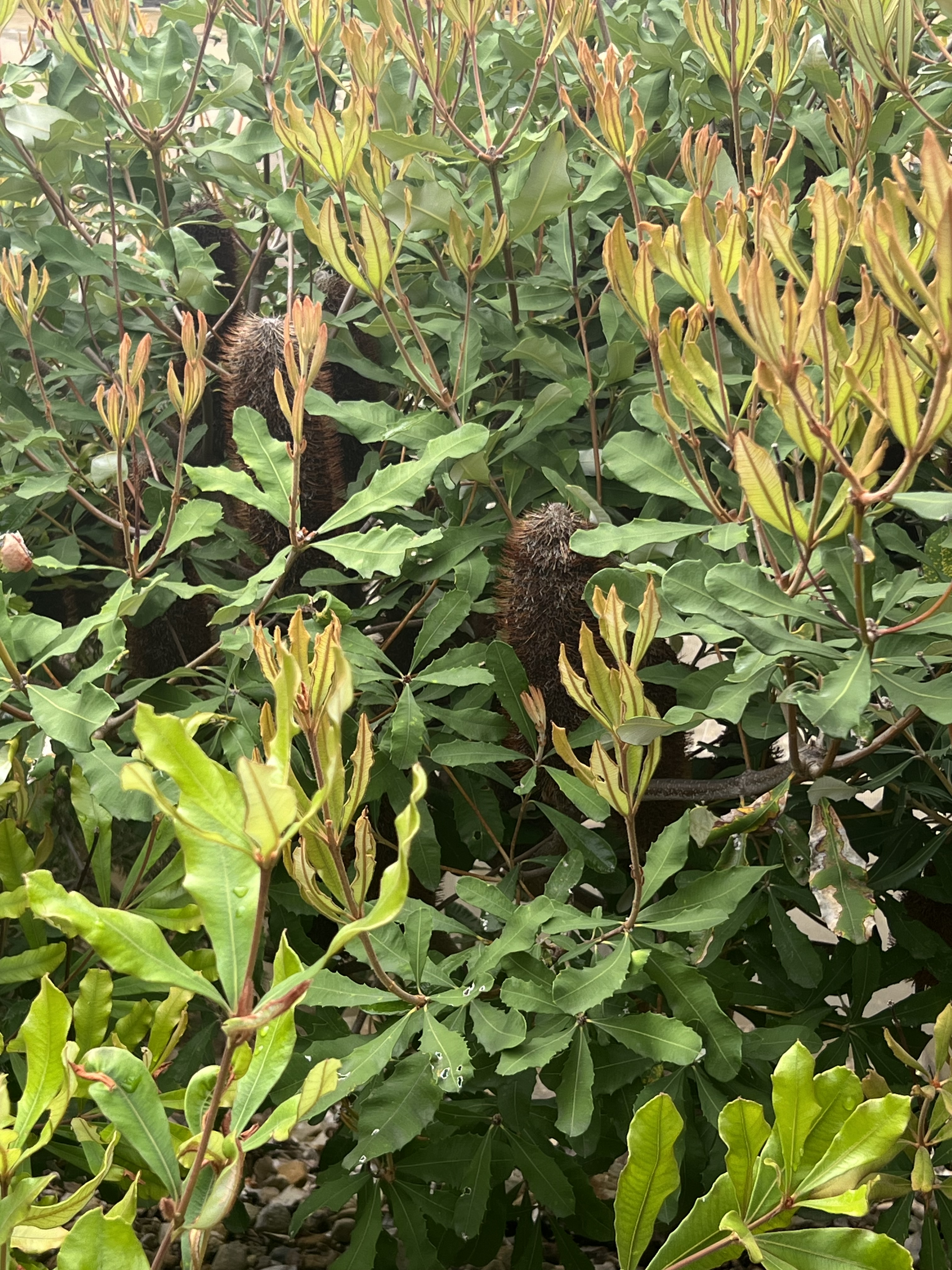
Foliage

Banksia penicillata is a species of shrub that is endemic to a restricted area of New South Wales. It has smooth bark, serrated, elliptic to egg-shaped leaves, green to bluish flower buds, later yellow flowers in a cylindrical spike, and later still, up to one hundred narrow elliptical follicles in each spike, surrounded by the remains of the flowers.

== Description ==
Banksia penicillata is a shrub that typically grows to a height of 4 m (13 ft) and has smooth bark but does not form a lignotuber. The leaves are arranged in whorls and are 35–120 mm (1.4–4.7 in) long and 7–40 mm (0.28–1.57 in) wide on a petiole 5–19 mm (0.20–0.75 in) long. The sides of the leaves are serrated or lobed and the lower surface is covered with woolly white hairs. The flower buds are green to bluish and are followed by yellow flowers in a cylindrical spike 70–190 mm (2.8–7.5 in) long with woolly-hairy involucral bracts 10–20 mm (0.39–0.79 in) long at the base of the spike. The perianth is 20–26 mm (0.79–1.02 in) long and the pistil 22–26 mm (0.87–1.02 in) long and slightly curved. Flowering occurs from March to June and up to one hundred elliptical follicles 11–15 mm (0.43–0.59 in) long and surrounded by the remains of the flowers, develop in each spike.

== Taxonomy and naming ==
Banksia conferta was first formally described in 1981 by Alex George in the journal Nuytsia. In the same publication he described two varieties, conferta and penicillata. In 1996, George raised the variety penicillata to subspecies B. conferta subsp. penicillata, at the same time creating the autonym B. conferta subsp. conferta. In the same year (1996), Kevin Thiele and Pauline Ladiges raised subspecies penicillata to species status as B. penicillata in Australian Systematic Botany, based on the differences in habit, bark, leaf shape, indumentum and flower colour, and the fact that the two taxa were so far from each other. According to their morphological cladistic analysis, B. penicillata was sister taxon to B. paludosa. In the same paper, the authors noted that the adult leaves of B. penicillata and B. paludosa have toothed margins, but B. conferta has entire margins. The change is accepted by the Australian Plant Census. The specific epithet (penicillata) is from the Latin word penicillatus, meaning "like an artist's camel-hair brush. A 2013 molecular study by Marcel Cardillo and colleagues using chloroplast DNA and combining it with earlier results placed B. penicillata as a part of a lineage that gave rise to the three subspecies of B. integrifolia.

== Distribution and habitat ==
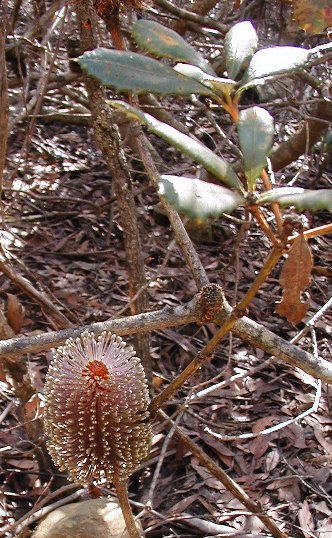
In bud, Newnes Plateau

Banksia penicillata grows on and near rocky sandstone cliffs in forest and woodland in a few locations in the Blue Mountains west of Sydney.

== Ecology ==
This banksia does not have a lignotuber but the follicles remain closed until burnt in a bushfire. The plant is killed by fire but regenerates from seed. Fieldwork in 2021 established that intervals of under 12 years between bushfires severely compromised the ability of the species to reproduce afterwards, with little or no seedling recruitment observed. Researchers Ian Baird and Doug Benson recommended if possible, a minimum of 15 years between fires (and leaving some for 30 years unburnt) would give populations the best likelihood of survival.
