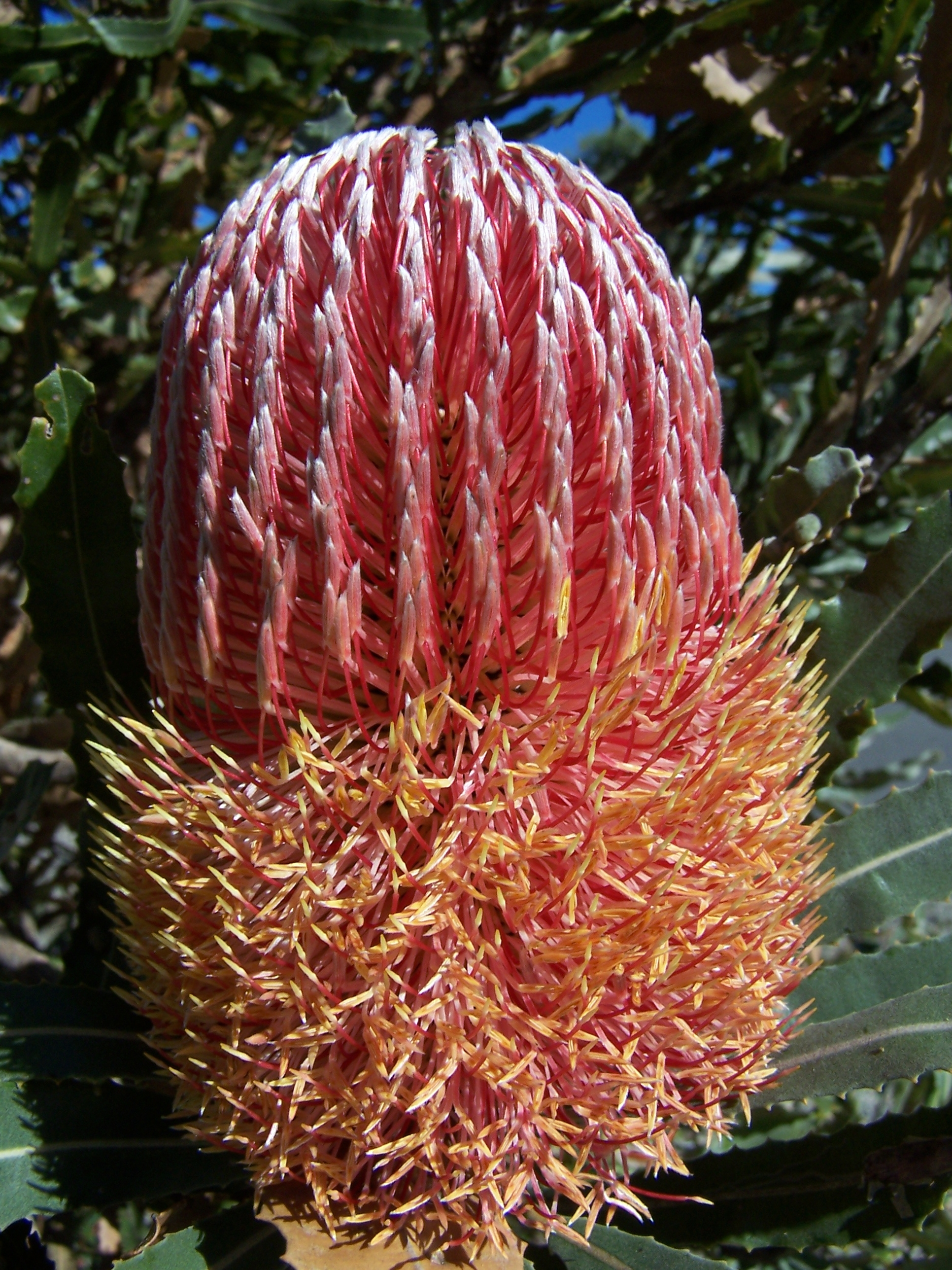
- Inflorescence of Banksia menziesii, a member of Banksia sect. Banksia

Scientific classification
- Kingdom: Plantae
- Clade: Tracheophytes
- Clade: Angiosperms
- Clade: Eudicots
- Order: Proteales
- Family: Proteaceae
- Genus: Banksia
- Subgenus: Banksia subg. Banksia
- Section: Banksia sect. Banksia; L.f.

Series
- See text.

= Banksia sect. Banksia =

Section of plants found in Australia

Banksia sect. Banksia is one of four sections of Banksia subgenus Banksia. It contains those species of subgenus Banksia with straight or sometimes curved but not hooked styles. These species all have cylindrical inflorescences and usually exhibit a bottom-up sequence of flower anthesis. It is a widely distributed section, with taxa occurring in both the south west and east coastal distributions of the genus.

Banksia sect. Banksia is further divided into nine series:

- Salicinae is one of the most primitive Banksia series; it contains 11 species, all highly variable;
- Grandes contains 2 species whose leaves have large prominent triangular lobes;
- Banksia contains 8 species with smooth or toothed leaves;
- Crocinae contains 4 species with woolly orange flowers;
- Prostratae contains 6 species that grow as prostrate shrubs;
- Cyrtostylis contains 13 species with unusually slender flowers;
- Tetragonae contains 3 species whose flower spikes hang down;
- Bauerinae contains a single species Banksia baueri;
- Quercinae contains 2 species that differ from other species in the section by some unusual anatomical features of their flowers, and their top-down sequence of anthesis.

== See also ==
- Taxonomy of Banksia
