= Anthesis =

Botanical term

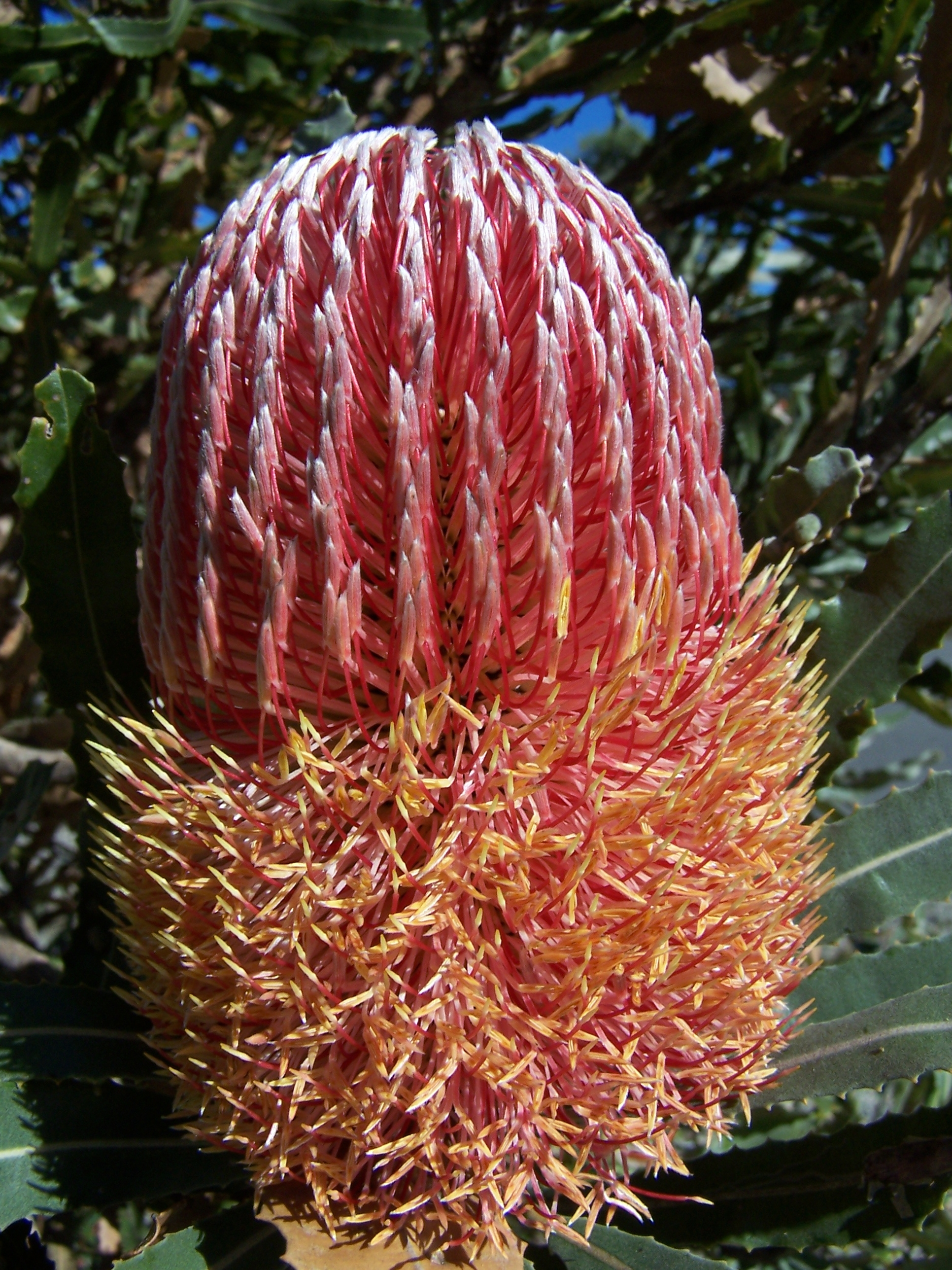
The sequential anthesis of the individual flowers in this Banksia menziesii inflorescence has begun.

Anthesis is the period during which a flower is fully open and functional. It may also refer to the onset of that period.

The onset of anthesis is spectacular in some species. In Banksia species, for example, anthesis involves the extension of the style far beyond the upper perianth parts. Anthesis of flowers is sequential within an inflorescence, so when the style and perianth are different colours, the result is a striking colour change that gradually sweeps along the inflorescence.

Flowers with diurnal anthesis generally are brightly colored in order to attract diurnal insects, such as butterflies. Flowers with nocturnal anthesis generally are white or less colorful, and as such, they contrast more strongly with the night. These flowers typically attract nocturnal insects including many moth species.
