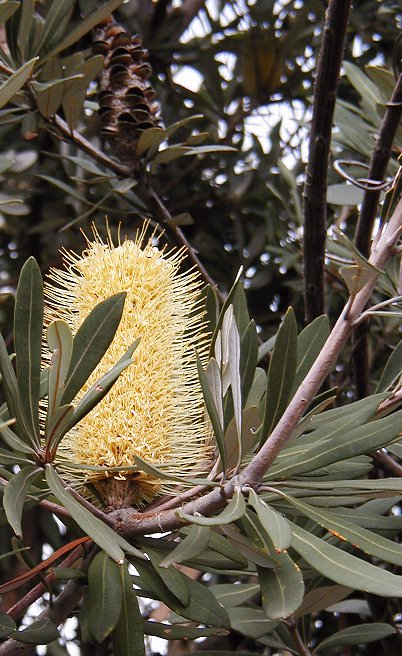
- B. integrifolia (coast banksia), type species for B. subg. Spathulatae

Scientific classification
- Kingdom: Plantae
- Clade: Tracheophytes
- Clade: Angiosperms
- Clade: Eudicots
- Order: Proteales
- Family: Proteaceae
- Genus: Banksia
- Subgenus: Banksia subg. Spathulatae; A.R.Mast & K.R.Thiele

= Banksia subg. Spathulatae =

Subgenus of plant found in Australia

Banksia subg. Spathulatae is a valid botanic name for a subgenus of Banksia. It was published in 2007 by Austin Mast and Kevin Thiele, and defined as containing all those Banksia species having spathulate (spoon-shaped) cotyledons. The name was published to accommodate forthcoming changes to the taxonomic arrangement of Banksia, based on the DNA sequence analyses of Austin Mast and others, which suggested a phylogeny for Banksia very greatly different from the accepted taxonomic arrangement. They found Banksia to be paraphyletic with respect to Dryandra, and that these two genera were best split into two clades, one with beaked follicles and non-spathulate cotyledons, the other with unbeaked follicles and spathulate cotyledons. Initially this clade was informally named "/Cryptostomata", in reference to the stomates, which are sunken with constricted entrances. Accordingly, in 2007 Mast and Thiele initiated a rearrangement by transferring Dryandra to Banksia, and publishing B. subg. Spathulatae for the species having spathulate cotyledons. The type species of Spathulatae was given as B. integrifolia (coast banksia), but no further details have been given. Mast and Thiele have foreshadowed publishing a full arrangement once DNA sampling of Dryandra is complete.

== See also ==
- Taxonomy of Banksia
