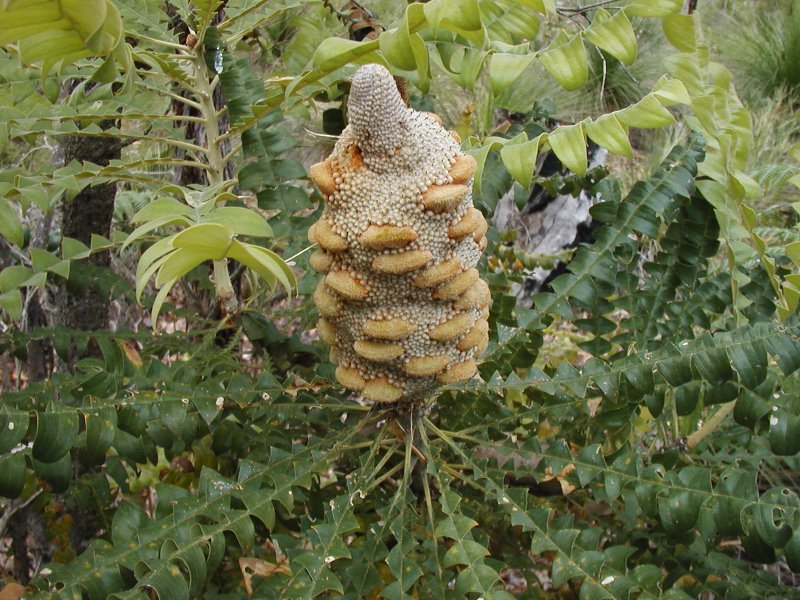
- Banksia grandis, a member of series Grandes

Scientific classification
- Kingdom: Plantae
- Clade: Tracheophytes
- Clade: Angiosperms
- Clade: Eudicots
- Order: Proteales
- Family: Proteaceae
- Genus: Banksia
- Subgenus: Banksia subg. Banksia
- Section: Banksia sect. Banksia
- Series: Banksia ser. Grandes; A.S.George

Species
- B. grandis B. solandri

= Banksia ser. Grandes =

Taxonomic series of Australian plants

Banksia ser. Grandes is a taxonomic series in the genus Banksia. It consists of two closely related species in section Banksia, both endemic to Western Australia. These are B. grandis and B. solandri.

== Species ==
Flower	Plant	Scientific name	Common name	Distribution
		B. grandis	Bull Banksia, Giant Banksia or Mangite	South West Western Australia.
		B. solandri	Stirling Range Banksia	Stirling Range in southwest Western Australia
