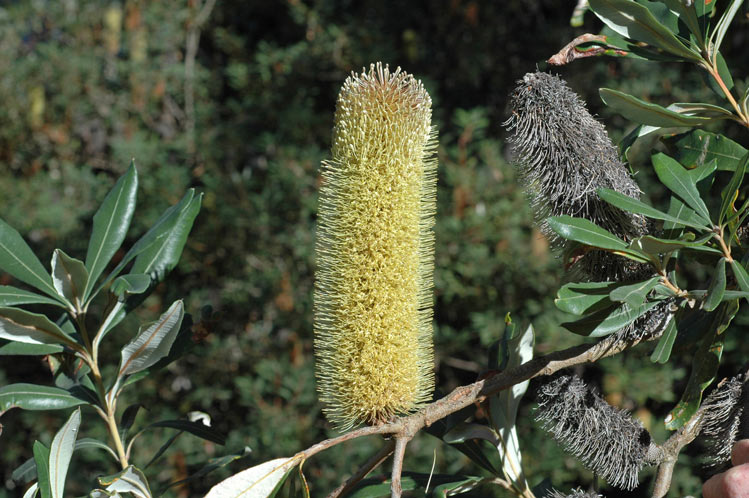
- In the Australian National Botanic Gardens

Scientific classification
- Kingdom: Plantae
- Clade: Tracheophytes
- Clade: Angiosperms
- Clade: Eudicots
- Order: Proteales
- Family: Proteaceae
- Genus: Banksia
- Species: B. conferta

Binomial name
- Banksia conferta A.S.George

Synonyms
- Banksia conferta A.S.George subsp. conferta; Banksia conferta A.S.George var. conferta

= Banksia conferta =

Species of shrub endemic to eastern Australia

Banksia conferta, commonly known as the glasshouse banksia, is a species of shrub that is endemic to eastern Australia. It has rough bark on the trunk, elliptic to egg-shaped leaves arranged in whorls, and crowded yellow flowers in a cylindrical spike later forming a relatively large number of follicles.

== Description ==
Banksia conferta is a shrub that typically grows to a height of 4 m (13 ft) but does not form a lignotuber. It has rough, grey, tessellated bark on the trunk and orange, red or brown stems that are hairy at first. The leaves are arranged in whorls and are elliptic to egg-shaped with the narrower end towards the base, 35–120 mm (1.4–4.7 in) long and 7–40 mm (0.28–1.57 in) wide with the edges curved downwards and sometimes serrated. The flowers are crowded in a cylindrical spike 70–190 mm (2.8–7.5 in) long with involucral bracts 10–20 mm (0.39–0.79 in) long at the base. The flowers are yellowish green to pinkish brown in the bud stage, turning golden yellow when open. The perianth is 20–26 mm (0.79–1.02 in) long and the pistil is 22–26 mm (0.87–1.02 in) long and slightly curved. Flowering occurs from late April to July and the fruit is a narrow elliptical follicle 8–15 mm (0.31–0.59 in) long, 2–6 mm (0.079–0.236 in) high and 3–5 mm (0.12–0.20 in) wide. More than 100 follicles often form in each spike, surrounded by the remains of the flowers. The follicles remain until the plant is burned, unlike those of the similar B. integrifolia which also has less crowded flowers.

== Taxonomy and naming ==
Banksia conferta was first collected by Lawrie Johnson from the McPherson Range in Lamington National Park in May 1951, but not formally described until 1981. In that year, Alex George named it in the journal Nuytsia from specimens he collected from Mount Tibrogargan in the Glass House Mountains National Park in 1975. The specific epithet (conferta) is a Latin word meaning "crowded". He felt it had evolved from Banksia integrifolia but was distinct enough to warrant species status.

In the same journal, George described variety conferta and var. penicillata, and in 1996 he described subspecies conferta and subsp. penicillata. He described subsp. conferta as being found in southern Queensland on the Lamington Plateau and the Glass House Mountains and subsp. penicillata from Bowral to north of Lithgow in New South Wales.

In 1996, Kevin Thiele and Pauline Ladiges raised subspecies penicillata to species status as B. penicillata in Australian Systematic Botany, based on the differences in habit, bark, leaf shape, indumentum and flower colour, and the fact that the two taxa were so far from each other. According to their morphological cladistic analysis, B. penicillata was sister taxon to B. paludosa. Hence var. conferta and subsp. conferta became synonyms of B. conferta.

== Distribution and habitat ==
This banksia is known from the Lamington Plateau and the Glass House Mountains in southern Queensland where it grows on steep rocky slopes in scrub and open shrubland and in the Coorabakh National Park in New South Wales. Subspecies conferta is restricted to the Coorabakh National Park and is listed as "critically endangered" under the Biodiversity Conservation Act 2016.

Botanist Stephen Bell investigated the Coorabakh population and noted low rates of follicle formation, postulating that a lack of mammalian pollinators may be impacting on the pollination of the species there.
