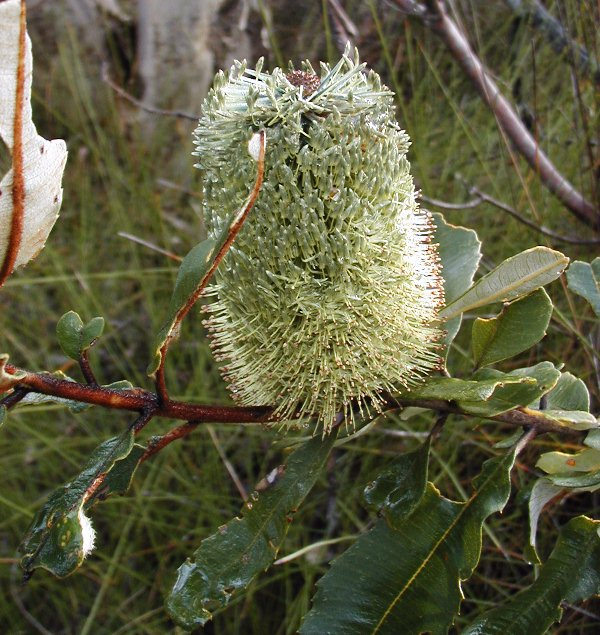
- Banksia oblongifolia, Georges River National Park

Conservation status
- Least Concern (IUCN 3.1)

Scientific classification
- Kingdom: Plantae
- Clade: Tracheophytes
- Clade: Angiosperms
- Clade: Eudicots
- Order: Proteales
- Family: Proteaceae
- Genus: Banksia
- Subgenus: Banksia subg. Banksia
- Section: Banksia sect. Banksia
- Series: Banksia ser. Salicinae
- Species: B. oblongifolia

Binomial name
- Banksia oblongifolia Cav.
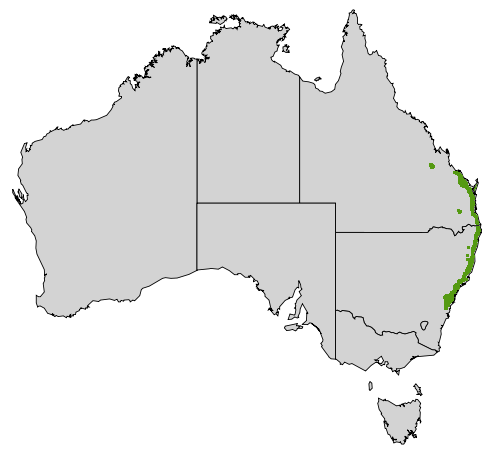
- Distribution of B. oblongifolia (green)

Synonyms
- Banksia salicifolia Cav.; Banksia latifolia var. minor Maiden & Camfield; Banksia robur var. minor (Maiden & Camfield) Maiden & Betche; Banksia integrifolia var. oblongifolia (Cav.) Domin

= Banksia oblongifolia =

Fern-leaved banksia

Species of plant

Banksia oblongifolia, commonly known as the fern-leaved, dwarf or rusty banksia, is a species in the plant genus Banksia. Found along the eastern coast of Australia from Wollongong, New South Wales, in the south to Rockhampton, Queensland, in the north, it generally grows in sandy soils in heath, open forest or swamp margins and wet areas. A many-stemmed shrub up to 3 m (9.8 ft) high, it has leathery serrated leaves and rusty-coloured new growth. The yellow flower spikes, known as inflorescences, most commonly appear in autumn and early winter. Up to 80 follicles, or seed pods, develop on the spikes after flowering. Banksia oblongifolia resprouts from its woody lignotuber after bushfires, and the seed pods open and release seed when burnt, the seed germinating and growing on burnt ground. Some plants grow between fires from seed shed spontaneously.

Spanish botanist Antonio José Cavanilles described B. oblongifolia in 1800, though it was known as Banksia aspleniifolia in New South Wales for many years. However, the latter name, originally coined by Richard Anthony Salisbury, proved invalid, and Banksia oblongifolia has been universally adopted as the correct scientific name since 1981. Two varieties were recognised in 1987, but these have not been generally accepted. A wide array of mammals, birds, and invertebrates visit the inflorescences. Though easily grown as a garden plant, it is not commonly seen in horticulture.

== Description ==
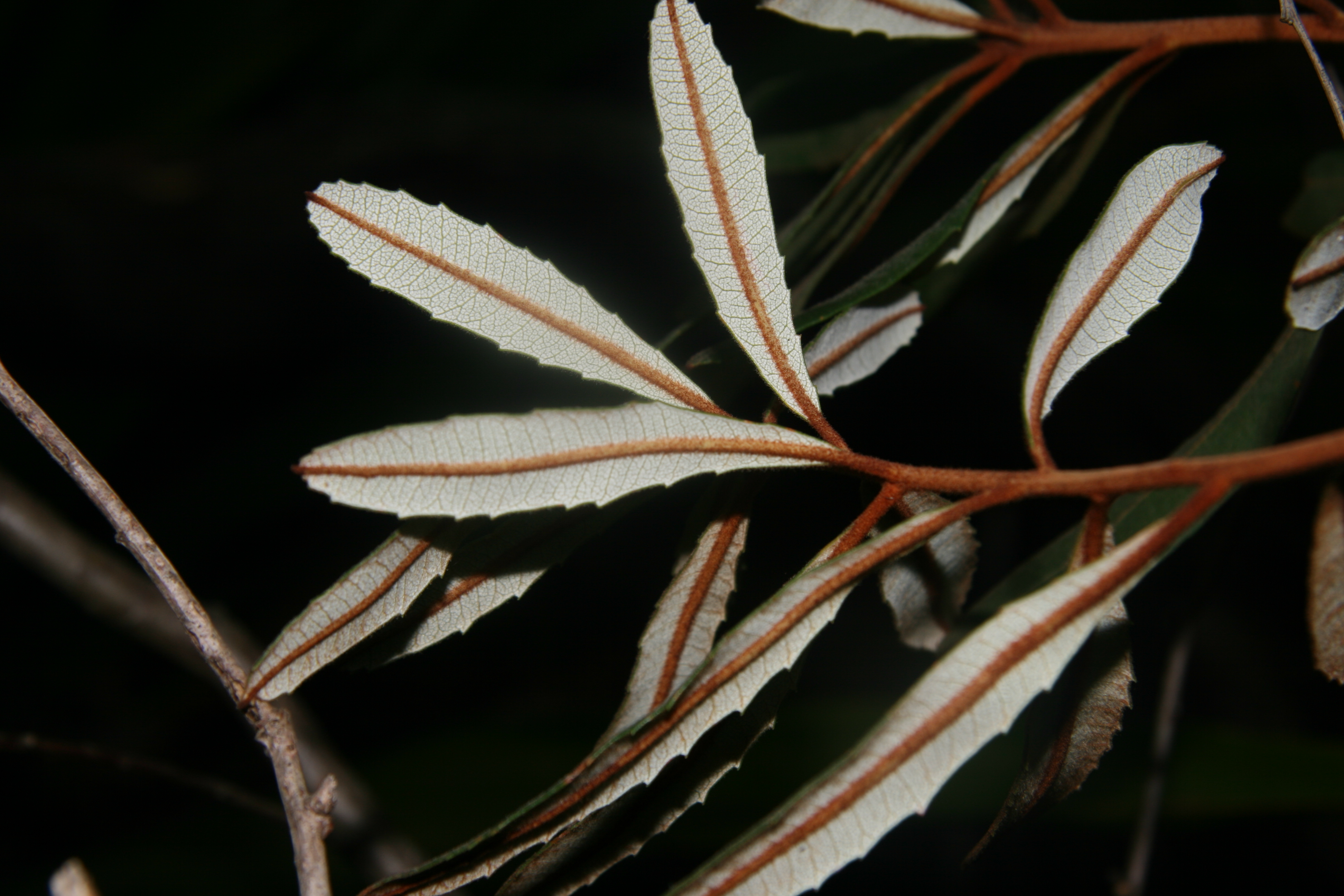
Leaf undersides showing the prominent rusty midrib, a key distinguishing feature

Banksia oblongifolia is a shrub that can reach 3 m (9.8 ft) high, though is generally less than 2 m (6.6 ft) high, with several stems growing out of a woody base known as a lignotuber. The smooth bark is marked with horizontal lenticels, and is reddish-brown fading to greyish-brown with age. New leaves and branchlets are covered with a rusty fur. The leaves lose their fur and become smooth with maturity, and are alternately arranged along the stem. Measuring 5–11 cm (2.0–4.3 in) in length and 1.5–2 cm (0.59–0.79 in) in width, the leathery green leaves are oblong to obovate (egg-shaped) or truncate with a recessed midvein and mildly recurved margins, which are entire at the base and serrate towards the ends of the leaves. The sinuses (spaces between the teeth) are U-shaped and teeth are 1–2 mm long. The leaf underside is whitish with a reticulated vein pattern and a raised central midrib. The leaves sit on 2–5 mm long petioles.

Flowering has been recorded between January and October, with a peak in autumn and early winter (April to June). The inflorescences, or flower spikes, arise from the end of 1 to 5 year old branchlets, and often have a whorl of branchlets arising from the node or base. Measuring 5–15 cm (2.0–5.9 in) high and 4 cm (1.6 in) wide, the yellow spikes often have blue-grey tinged limbs in bud, though occasionally pinkish, mauve or mauve-blue limbs are seen. Opening to a pale yellow after anthesis, the spikes lose their flowers with age and swell to up to 17.5 cm (6.9 in) high and 4 cm (1.6 in) wide, with up to 80 follicles. Covered with fine fur but becoming smooth with age, the oval-shaped follicles measure 1–1.8 cm (0.39–0.71 in) long by 0.2–0.7 cm high (0.1–0.3 in) and 0.3–0.7 cm (0.12–0.28 in) wide. The bare swollen spike, now known as an infructescence, is patterned with short spiky persistent bracts on its surface where follicles have not developed. Each follicle contains one or two obovate dark grey-brown to black seeds sandwiching a woody separator. Measuring 1.2–1.8 cm (0.47–0.71 in) long, they are made up of an oblong to semi-elliptic smooth or slightly ridged seed body, 0.7–1.1 cm (0.28–0.43 in) long by 0.3–0.7 cm (0.12–0.28 in) wide. The woody separator is the same shape as the seed, with an impression where the seed body lies next to it. Seedlings have bright obovate green cotyledons 1.2–1.5 cm (0.47–0.59 in) long and 0.5–0.7 cm (0.20–0.28 in) wide, which sit on a stalk, or 1 mm diameter finely hairy seedling stem, known as the hypocotyl, which is less than 1 cm high. The first seedling leaves to emerge are paired (oppositely arranged) and lanceolate with fine-toothed margins, measuring 2.5–3 cm long and 0.4–0.5 cm wide. Subsequent leaves are more oblanceolate, elliptic (oval-shaped) or linear. Young plants develop a lignotuber in their first year.

Banksia oblongifolia can be distinguished from B. robur, which it often co-occurs with, by its smaller leaves and bare fruiting spikes. B. robur has more metallic green flower spikes, and often grows in wetter areas within the same region. B. plagiocarpa has longer leaves with more coarsely serrated margins, and its flower spikes are blue-grey in bud, and later bear wedge-shaped follicles. In the Sydney Basin, B. paludosa also bears a superficial resemblance to B. oblongifolia, but its leaves are more prominently spathulate (spoon-shaped) and tend to point up rather than down. The leaf undersides are white and lack the prominent midrib of B. oblongifolia, the new growth is bare and lacks the rusty fur, and the aged flower parts remain on the old spikes.

== Taxonomy ==
First collected by Luis Née between March and April 1793, the fern-leaved banksia was described by Spanish botanist Antonio José Cavanilles in 1800 as two separate species from two collections, first as Banksia oblongifolia from the vicinity of Port Jackson (Sydney), and then as Banksia salicifolia from around Botany Bay. Derived from the Latin words oblongus "oblong", and folium "leaf", the species name refers to the shape of the leaves. Richard Anthony Salisbury had published the name Banksia aspleniifolia in 1796 based on leaves of cultivated material.

Robert Brown recorded 31 species of Banksia in his 1810 work Prodromus Florae Novae Hollandiae et Insulae Van Diemen, and used the epithet oblongifolia in his taxonomic arrangement, placing the taxon in the subgenus Banksia verae, the "True Banksias", because the inflorescence is a typical Banksia flower spike. He recognised B. salicifolia as the same species at this point, but was unsure whether Salisbury's B. aspleniifolia belonged under the same name. By the time Carl Meissner published his 1856 arrangement of the genus, there were 58 described Banksia species. Meissner divided Brown's Banksia verae, which had been renamed Eubanksia by Stephan Endlicher in 1847, into four series based on leaf properties. He followed Brown in using the name B. oblongifolia, and placed it in the series Salicinae.

In 1870, George Bentham published a thorough revision of Banksia in his landmark publication Flora Australiensis. In Bentham's arrangement, the number of recognised Banksia species was reduced from 60 to 46. He declared B. oblongifolia referrable to, and a synonym of, B. integrifolia. Bentham defined four sections based on leaf, style and pollen-presenter characters. B. integrifolia was placed in section Eubanksia.

Botanists in the 20th century recognised B. oblongifolia as a species in its own right, but disagreed on the name. Those in Queensland felt Salisbury's name was invalid and used Banksia oblongifolia, while New South Wales authorities used Banksia aspleniifolia as it was the oldest published name for the species. Botanist and banksia authority Alex George ruled that oblongifolia was the correct name in his 1981 revision of the genus. After reviewing Salisbury's original species description, which is of the leaves alone, he concluded that it does not diagnose the species to the exclusion of others and is hence not a validly published name—the description could have applied to juvenile leaves of B. paludosa, B. integrifolia or even B. marginata.

=== Placement within Banksia ===
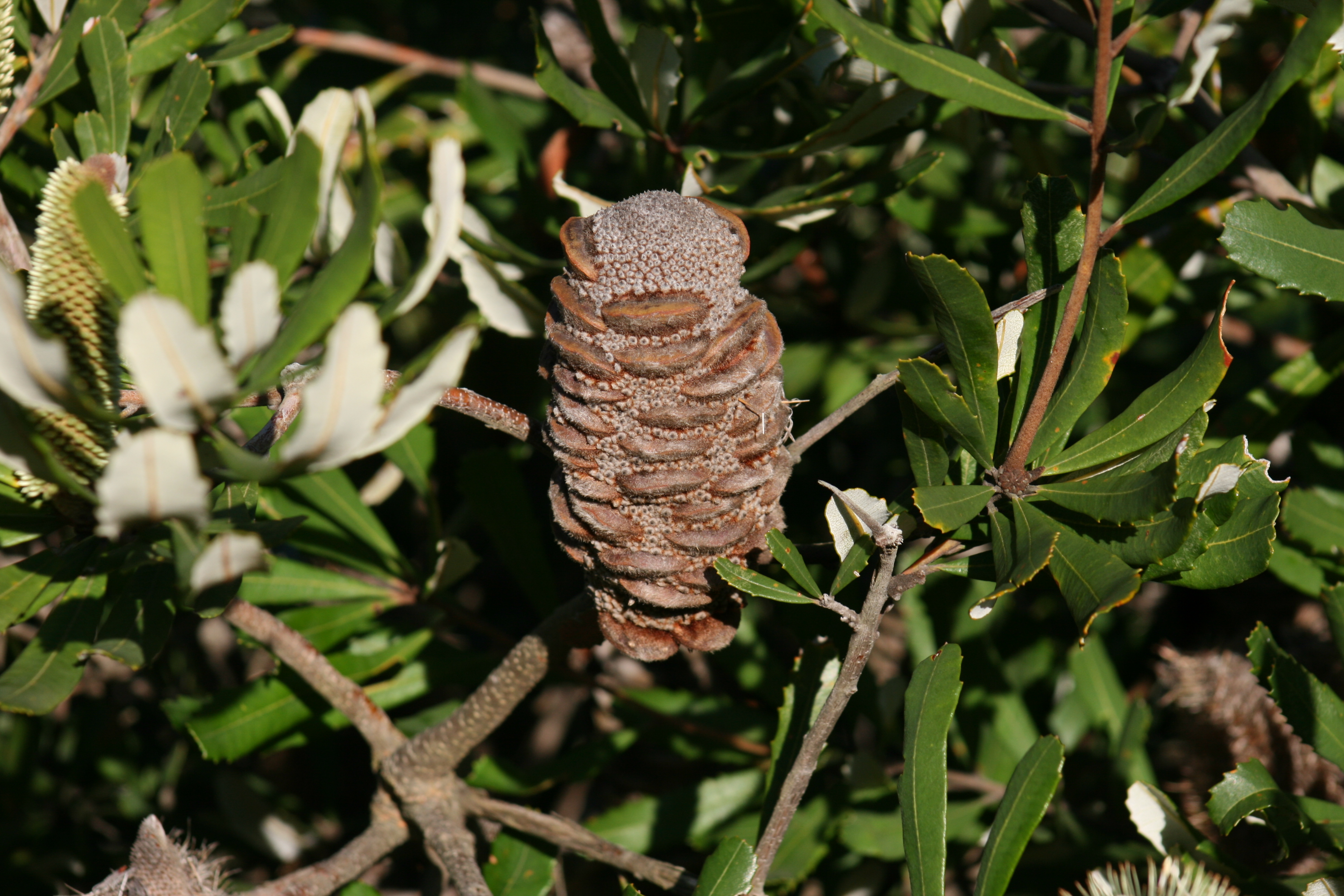
Old bare spike with follicles, Stanwell Tops, New South Wales

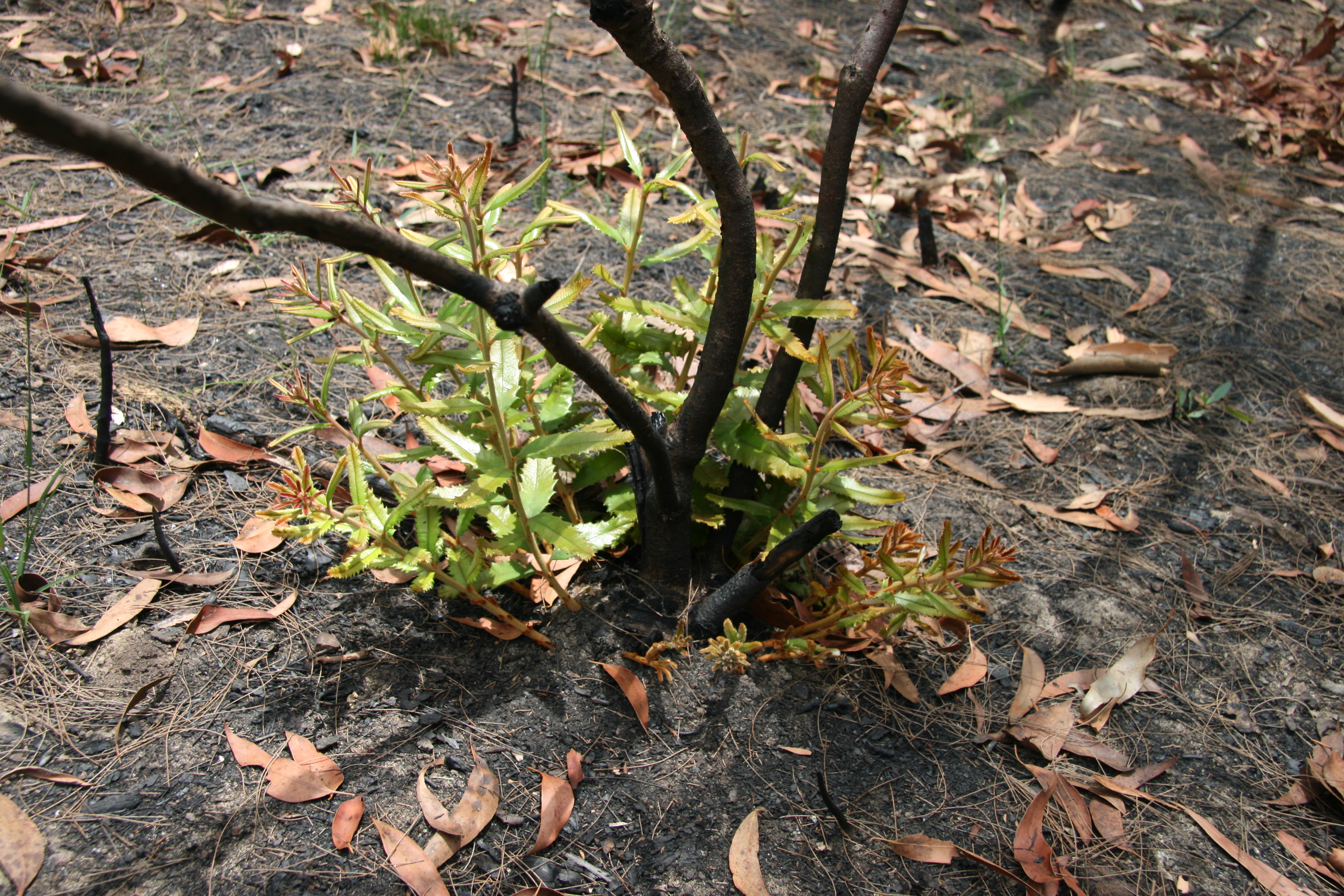
New stems arising from the woody lignotuber after bushfire, also showing the rusty new growth, Lane Cove National Park

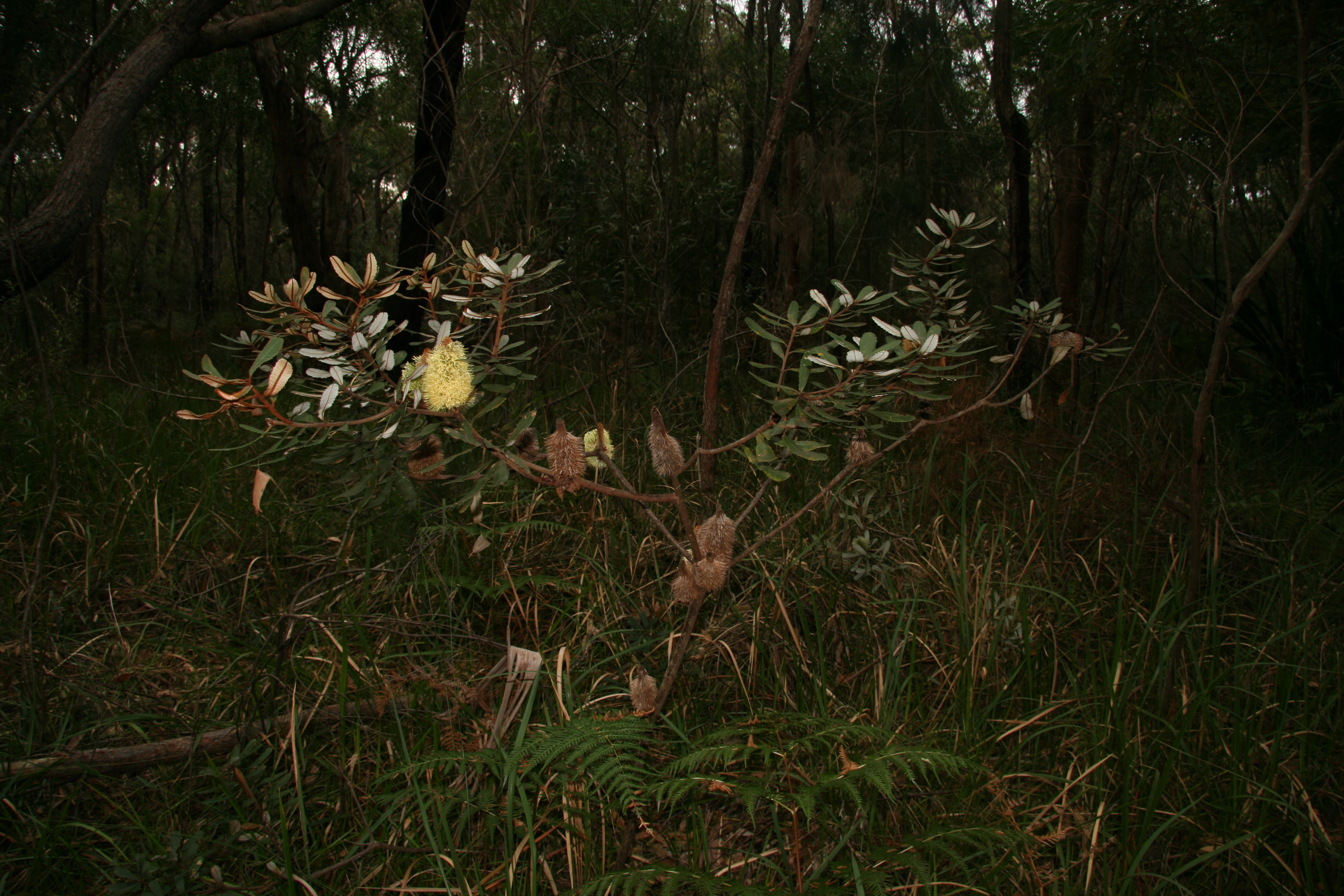
Habit, Royal National Park

The current taxonomic arrangement of the genus Banksia is based on botanist Alex George's 1999 monograph for the Flora of Australia book series. In this arrangement, B. oblongifolia is placed in Banksia subgenus Banksia, because its inflorescences take the form of Banksia's characteristic flower spikes, section Banksia because of its straight styles, and series Salicinae because its inflorescences are cylindrical. In a morphological cladistic analysis published in 1994, Kevin Thiele placed it in the newly described subseries Acclives along with B. plagiocarpa, B. robur and B. dentata within the series Salicinae. However, this subgrouping of the Salicinae was not supported by George. B. oblongifolia's placement within Banksia may be summarised as follows:

Genus Banksia

Subgenus Isostylis
Subgenus Banksia

Section Oncostylis
Section Coccinea
Section Banksia

Series Grandes
Series Banksia
Series Crocinae
Series Prostratae
Series Cyrtostylis
Series Tetragonae
Series Bauerinae
Series Quercinae
Series Salicinae

B. dentata – B. aquilonia – B. integrifolia – B. plagiocarpa – B. oblongifolia – B. robur – B. conferta – B. paludosa – B. marginata – B. canei – B. saxicola

Since 1998, American botanist Austin Mast and co-authors have been publishing results of ongoing cladistic analyses of DNA sequence data for the subtribe Banksiinae, which then comprised genera Banksia and Dryandra. Their analyses suggest a phylogeny that differs greatly from George's taxonomic arrangement. Banksia oblongifolia resolves as the closest relative, or "sister", to B. robur, with B. plagiocarpa as next closest relative. In 2007, Mast and Thiele rearranged the genus Banksia by merging Dryandra into it, and published B. subg. Spathulatae for the taxa having spoon-shaped cotyledons; thus B. subg. Banksia was redefined as encompassing taxa lacking spoon-shaped cotyledons. They foreshadowed publishing a full arrangement once DNA sampling of Dryandra was complete; in the meantime, if Mast and Thiele's nomenclatural changes are taken as an interim arrangement, B. oblongifolia is placed in B. subg. Spathulatae.

=== Variation ===
George noted that Banksia oblongifolia showed considerable variation in habit, and in 1987 Conran and Clifford separated the taxon into two subspecies. In examining populations in southern Queensland, they reported that the two forms were distinct in growth habit and habitat, and that they did not find any intermediate forms. New South Wales botanists Joseph Maiden and Julius Henry Camfield had collected this taller form of B. oblongifolia in Kogarah in 1898, and given it the name Banksia latifolia variety minor—B. latifolia being a published name by which B. robur was known—before Maiden and Ernst Betche renamed it Banksia robur variety minor. This name (confusingly) thus became the name for the taller variety. They defined variety oblongifolia as a multistemmed shrub 0.5–1.3 m (20–51 in) high, with leaves 3–11 cm (1.2–4.3 in) long and 1–2.5 cm (0.39–0.98 in) wide, and flower spikes 4–10 cm (1.6–3.9 in) high. The habitat is swamps and swamp borders, or rarely sandstone ridges. Variety minor is a taller shrub 1–3.5 m (3.3–11.5 ft) high with leaves up to 16 cm (6.3 in) long and spikes 6 to 14 cm (2.4 to 5.5 in) high. It is an understory plant in sclerophyll forests, associated with Eucalyptus signata and Banksia spinulosa var. collina. Both subspecies occur throughout the range. However, George rejected the varieties, stating the variability was continuous.

=== Hybridization ===
Banksia robur and B. oblongifolia hybrids have been recorded at several locations along the eastern coastline. Field workers for The Banksia Atlas recorded 20 populations between Wollongong and Pialba in central Queensland. Locales include Calga north of Sydney, Ku-ring-gai Chase National Park, and Cordeaux Dam near Wollongong. A study of an area of extensive hybridization between the two near Darkes Forest on the Woronora Plateau south of Sydney revealed extensive hybridization in mixed species stands but almost none in pure stands of either species there. Genetic analysis showed generations of crossing and complex ancestry. Morphology generally correlated with genetic profile, but occasionally plants that resembled one parent had some degree of genetic hybridization. Furthermore, there were a few plants with morphology suggestive of a third species, B. paludosa, in their parentage, and requiring further investigation. A possible hybrid between B. oblongifolia and B. integrifolia was recorded near Caloundra by Banksia Atlas volunteers.

== Distribution and habitat ==
Banksia oblongifolia occurs along the eastern coast of Australia from Wollongong, New South Wales, in the south to Rockhampton, Queensland, in the north. There are isolated populations offshore on Fraser Island, and inland at Blackdown Tableland National Park and Crows Nest in Queensland, and also inland incursions at the base of the Glasshouse Mountains in southern Queensland, at Grafton in northern New South Wales, and Bilpin and Lawson in the Blue Mountains west of Sydney. B. oblongifolia grows in a range of habitats—in damp areas with poor drainage, along the edges of swamps and flats, as well as wallum shrubland, or coastal plateaux. It is also found in open forest or woodland, where it grows on ridges or slopes, or heath. Soils are predominantly sandy or sandstone-based, though granite-based and clay-loams are sometimes present.

Associated species in the Sydney region include heathland species such as heath banksia (Banksia ericifolia), coral heath (Epacris microphylla) and mountain devil (Lambertia formosa), and tick bush (Kunzea ambigua) and prickly-leaved paperbark (Melaleuca nodosa) in taller scrub, and under trees such as scribbly gum (Eucalyptus sclerophylla) and narrow-leaved apple (Angophora bakeri) in woodland. The Agnes Banks Woodland in western Sydney has been recognised by the New South Wales Government as an Endangered Ecological Community. Here, B. oblongifolia is an understory plant in low open woodland, with scribbly gum, narrow-leaved apple and old man banksia (B. serrata) as canopy trees, and wallum banksia (B. aemula), variable smoke-bush (Conospermum taxifolium), wedding bush (Ricinocarpos pinifolius), showy parrot-pea (Dillwynia sericea) and nodding geebung (Persoonia nutans) as other understory species.

== Ecology ==
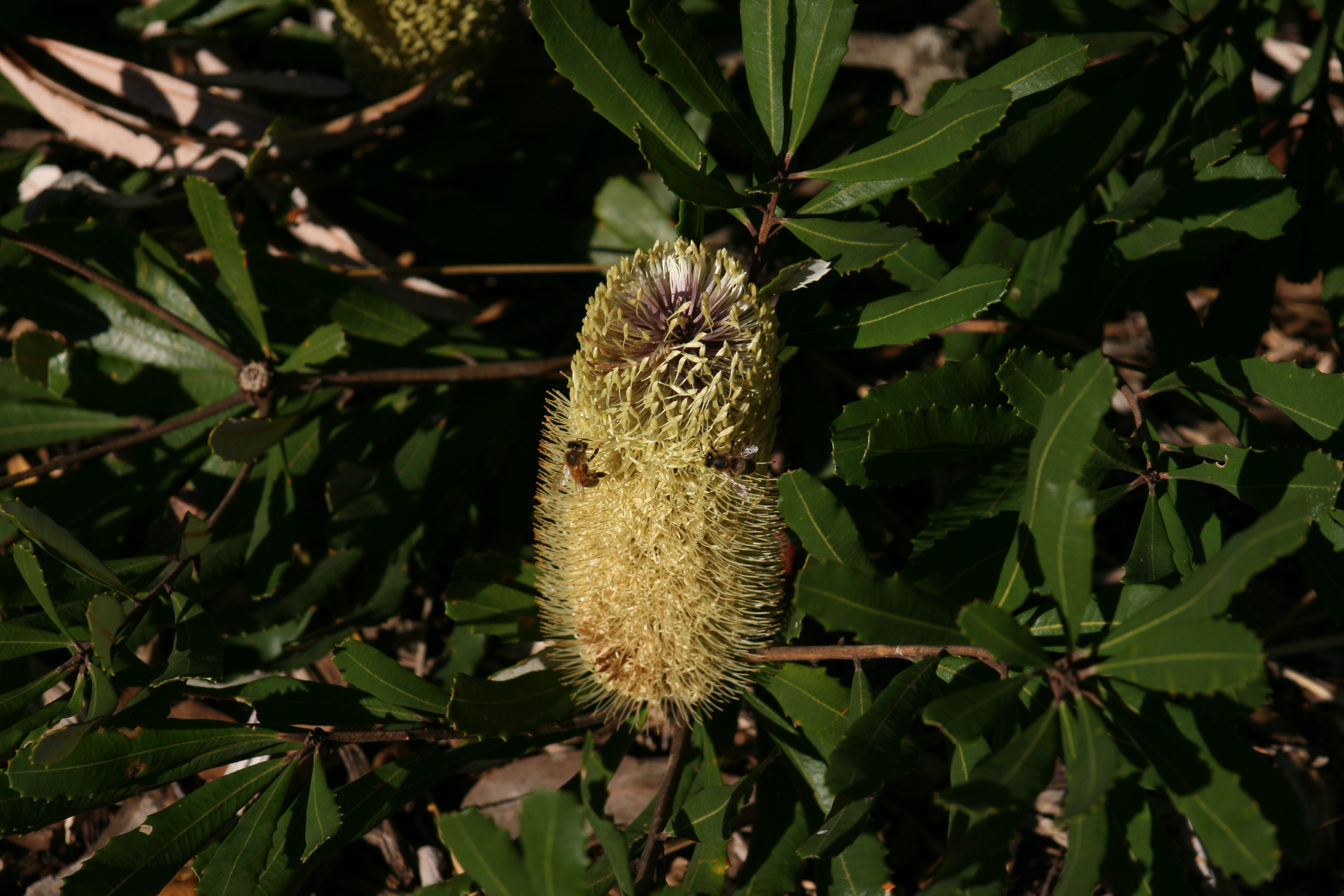
Honeybees visiting an inflorescence partway through anthesis

Banksia oblongifolia plants can live for more than 60 years. They respond to bushfire by resprouting from buds located on the large woody lignotuber. Larger lignotubers have the greatest number of buds, although buds are more densely spaced on smaller lignotubers. A 1988 field study in Ku-ring-gai Chase National Park found that shoots grow longer after fire, particularly one within the previous four years, and that new buds grow within six months after a fire. These shoots are able to grow, flower and set seed two to three years after a fire. The woody infructescences also release seeds as their follicles are opened with heat, although a proportion do open spontaneously at other times. One field study in Ku-ring-gai Chase National Park found 10% opened in the absence of bushfire, and that seeds germinated, and young plants do grow. Older plants are serotinous, that is, they store large numbers of seed in an aerial seed bank in their canopy that are released after fire. Being relatively heavy, the seeds do not disperse far from the parent plant.

Bird species that have been observed foraging and feeding at the flowers include the red wattlebird (Anthochaera carunculata), Lewin's honeyeater (Meliphaga lewinii), brown honeyeater (Lichmera indistincta), tawny-crowned honeyeater (Gliciphila melanops), yellow-faced honeyeater (Lichenostomus chrysops), white-plumed honeyeater (L. penicillatus), white-cheeked honeyeater (Phylidonyris niger), New Holland honeyeater (P. novaehollandiae), noisy friarbird (Philemon corniculatus), noisy miner (Manorina melanocephala) and eastern spinebill (Acanthorhynchus tenuirostris). Insects recorded visiting flower spikes include the European honey bee and ants. The swamp wallaby (Wallabia bicolor) eats new shoots that grow from lignotubers after bushfire.

One field study found 30% of seeds were eaten by insects between bushfires. Insects recovered from inflorescences include the banksia boring moth (Arotrophora arcuatalis), younger instars of which eat flower and bract parts before tunneling into the woody axis of the spike as they get older and boring into follicles and eating seeds. Other seed predators include unidentified species of moth of the genera Cryptophasa and Xylorycta, as well as Scieropepla rimata, Chalarotona intabescens and Chalarotona melipnoa and an unidentified weevil species. The fungal species Asterina systema-solare, Episphaerella banksiae and Lincostromea banksiae have been recorded on the leaves.

Like most other proteaceae, B. oblongifolia has proteoid roots—roots with dense clusters of short lateral rootlets that form a mat in the soil just below the leaf litter. These enhance solubilisation of nutrients, allowing nutrient uptake in low-nutrient soils such as the phosphorus-deficient native soils of Australia. A study of coastal heaths on Pleistocene sand dunes around the Myall Lakes found B. oblongifolia on slopes (wet heath) and B. aemula grew on ridges (dry heath), and the two species did not overlap. Manipulation of seedlings in the same study area showed that B. oblongifolia can grow longer roots seeking water than other wet heath species and that seedlings can establish in dry heath, but it is as yet unclear why the species does not grow in dry heath as well as wet heath. Unlike similar situations with Banksia species in Western Australia, the two species did not appear to impact negatively on each other.

== Cultivation ==
Conrad Loddiges and his sons wrote of Banksia oblongifolia in volume 3 of their work The Botanical Cabinet in 1818, reporting it had been brought into cultivation in 1792, though had been initially and incorrectly called Banksia dentata. It flowered in November in the United Kingdom, and was grown in a greenhouse over winter.

Not commonly cultivated, it adapts readily to garden conditions and tolerates most soils in part-shade or full sun. The colours of the inflorescences in bud, and timing of flowers into winter give it horticultural value, as does its reddish new growth. Larger plants have taller flower spikes. It is propagated readily from seed, with young plants taking five to seven years to flower from seed. Pruning can improve the shrub's appearance, and it is a potential bonsai subject.
