= Swamp banksia =

Swamp banksia is a common name for several plants and may refer to:

- Banksia littoralis, endemic to Western Australia
- Banksia paludosa, native to New South Wales
- Banksia robur, native to New South Wales
