= Chalarotona craspedota =

Scientific classification
- Kingdom: Animalia
- Phylum: Arthropoda
- Class: Insecta
- Order: Lepidoptera
- Family: Xyloryctidae
- Genus: Chalarotona
- Species: C. craspedota

Binomial name
- Chalarotona craspedota Meyrick, 1890

Species of moth

Chalarotona craspedota is a moth in the family Xyloryctidae. It was described by Edward Meyrick in 1890. It is found in Australia, where it has been recorded from New South Wales, South Australia and Victoria.

The wingspan is 17–19 mm. The forewings are silvery white, towards the apex slightly fuscous tinged and with a narrow fuscous or rather dark fuscous streak along the inner margin from near the base to the anal angle, the upper edge suffused and ochreous tinged. The hindwings are ochreous-grey whitish, towards the apex more ochreous tinged.
