= Chalarotona =

Scientific classification
- Kingdom: Animalia
- Phylum: Arthropoda
- Clade: Pancrustacea
- Class: Insecta
- Order: Lepidoptera
- Family: Xyloryctidae
- Genus: Chalarotona; Meyrick, 1890

Moth genus in family Xyloryctidae

Chalarotona is a genus of moths of the Xyloryctidae (Xyloryctinae) family.

== Species ==
- Chalarotona craspedota Meyrick, 1890
- Chalarotona insincera Meyrick, 1890
- Chalarotona intabescens Meyrick, 1890
- Chalarotona melipnoa Meyrick, 1890
- Chalarotona melitoleuca Meyrick, 1890
