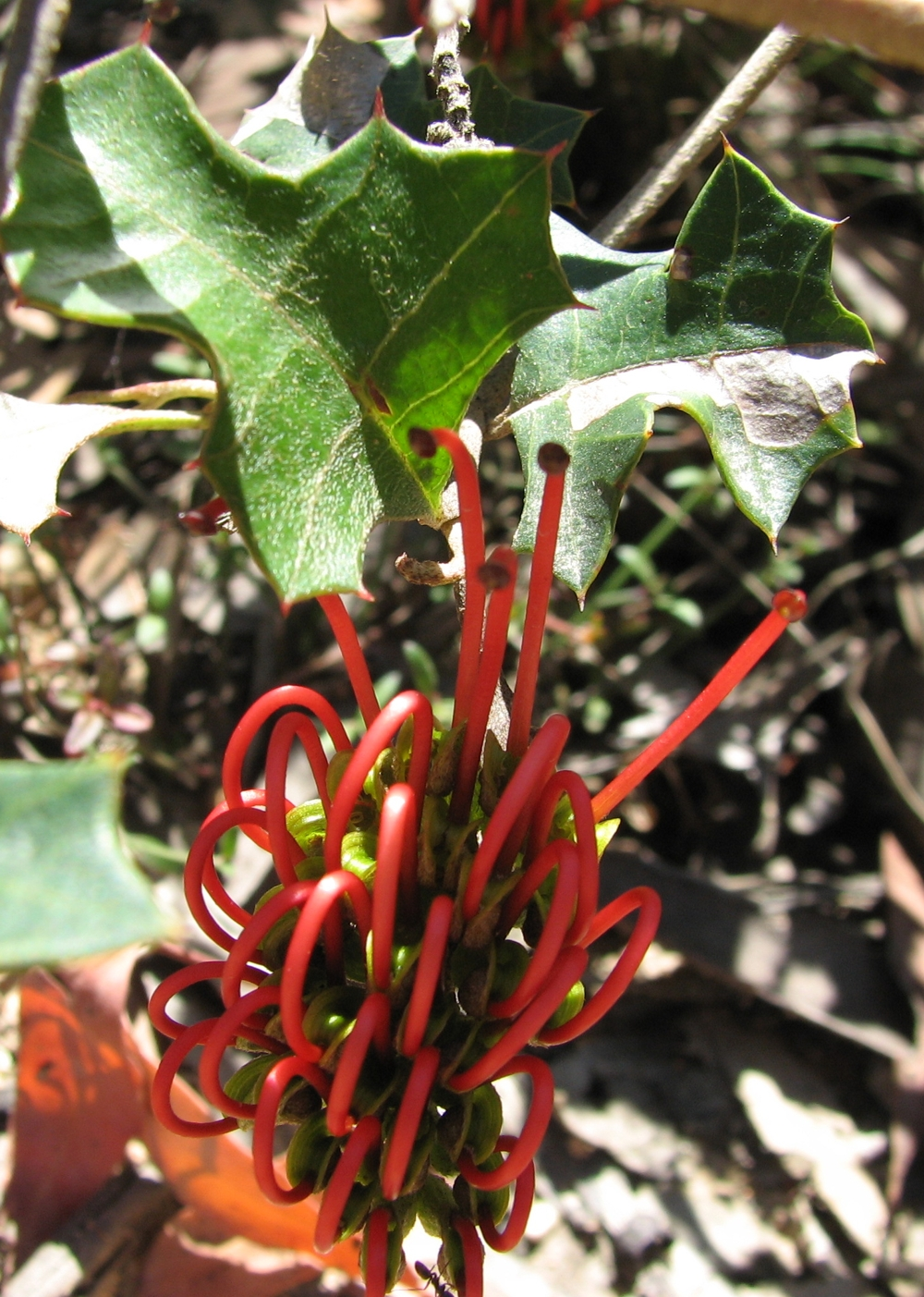
- Grevillea steiglitziana in the Brisbane Ranges National Park.

Scientific classification
- Kingdom: Plantae
- Clade: Tracheophytes
- Clade: Angiosperms
- Clade: Eudicots
- Order: Proteales
- Family: Proteaceae
- Genus: Grevillea
- Species: G. steiglitziana

Binomial name
- Grevillea steiglitziana N.A.Wakef.

= Grevillea steiglitziana =

Brisbane Ranges grevillea

Species of shrub endemic to Victoria, Australia

Grevillea steiglitziana, also known as Brisbane Range grevillea, Brisbane Ranges grevillea or Steiglitz grevillea, is a species of flowering plant in the family Proteaceae and is endemic to Victoria, Australia. It is a low, spreading shrub with pinnatifid to pinnatipartite leaves, and greenish-brown flowers with a red style.

== Description ==
Grevillea steiglitziana is a spreading shrub that typically grows to a height of 0.7 to 2 m (2 ft 4 in to 6 ft 7 in) and has silky-hairy branchlets. Its leaves are pinnatifid to pinnatipartite, egg-shaped in outline 25–70 mm (0.98–2.76 in) long and 25–55 mm (0.98–2.17 in) wide, usually with 5 to 7 lobes often divided again. The end lobes are more or less triangular, 3–22 mm (0.12–0.87 in) long, up to 13 mm (0.51 in) wide and sharply pointed. The flowers are arranged in clusters on one side of a rachis 25–50 mm (0.98–1.97 in) long and are greenish-brown with a red style, the pistil 22–27 mm (0.87–1.06 in) long. Flowering occurs from September to January and the fruit is a silky-hairy follicle 12.5–13.5 mm (0.49–0.53 in) long.

== Taxonomy ==
Grevillea steiglitziana was first formally described in 1956 by Norman Wakefield in The Victorian Naturalist from specimens collected by Percival St. John in 1911.

== Distribution and habitat ==
Grevillea steiglitziana occurs in dry sclerophyll forest in the Brisbane Ranges. It is named after the town of Steiglitz, Victoria. Brisbane Ranges National Park west of Melbourne was invaded by Phytophthora cinnamomi in the 1970s. Grevillea steiglitziana (along with such species as Banksia marginata) was part of a secondary regrowth of understorey species after more resistant shrubs such as grasses and sedges had grown back.

== Conservation status ==
Brisbane Range grevillea is listed as "endangered" under the Victorian Government Flora and Fauna Guarantee Act 1988 and as "rare in Victoria" on the Department of Sustainability and Environment's Advisory List of Rare Or Threatened Plants In Victoria.
