= Chalarotona melitoleuca =

Scientific classification
- Kingdom: Animalia
- Phylum: Arthropoda
- Class: Insecta
- Order: Lepidoptera
- Family: Xyloryctidae
- Genus: Chalarotona
- Species: C. melitoleuca

Binomial name
- Chalarotona melitoleuca Meyrick, 1890

Species of moth

Chalarotona melitoleuca is a moth in the family Xyloryctidae. It was described by Edward Meyrick in 1890. It is found in Australia, where it has been recorded from New South Wales and South Australia.

The wingspan is 11–14 mm. The forewings are rather deep ochreous yellow and the hindwings are ochreous whitish.
