= Chalarotona insincera =

Scientific classification
- Kingdom: Animalia
- Phylum: Arthropoda
- Class: Insecta
- Order: Lepidoptera
- Family: Xyloryctidae
- Genus: Chalarotona
- Species: C. insincera

Binomial name
- Chalarotona insincera Meyrick, 1890

Species of moth

Chalarotona insincera is a moth in the family Xyloryctidae. It was described by Edward Meyrick in 1890. It is found in Australia, where it has been recorded from New South Wales and Tasmania.

The wingspan is 16–21 mm. The forewings are shining ochreous white and the hindwings are light grey, the apex tinged with whitish ochreous.
