= Chalarotona melipnoa =

Scientific classification
- Kingdom: Animalia
- Phylum: Arthropoda
- Class: Insecta
- Order: Lepidoptera
- Family: Xyloryctidae
- Genus: Chalarotona
- Species: C. melipnoa

Binomial name
- Chalarotona melipnoa Meyrick, 1890

Species of moth

Chalarotona melipnoa is a moth in the family Xyloryctidae. It was described by Edward Meyrick in 1890. It is found in Australia, where it has been recorded from the Australian Capital Territory, New South Wales and South Australia.

The wingspan is 16–21 mm. The forewings are light yellowish ochreous and the hindwings are grey.

The larvae bore the flower spikes of Banksia ericifolia and Banksia marginata.
