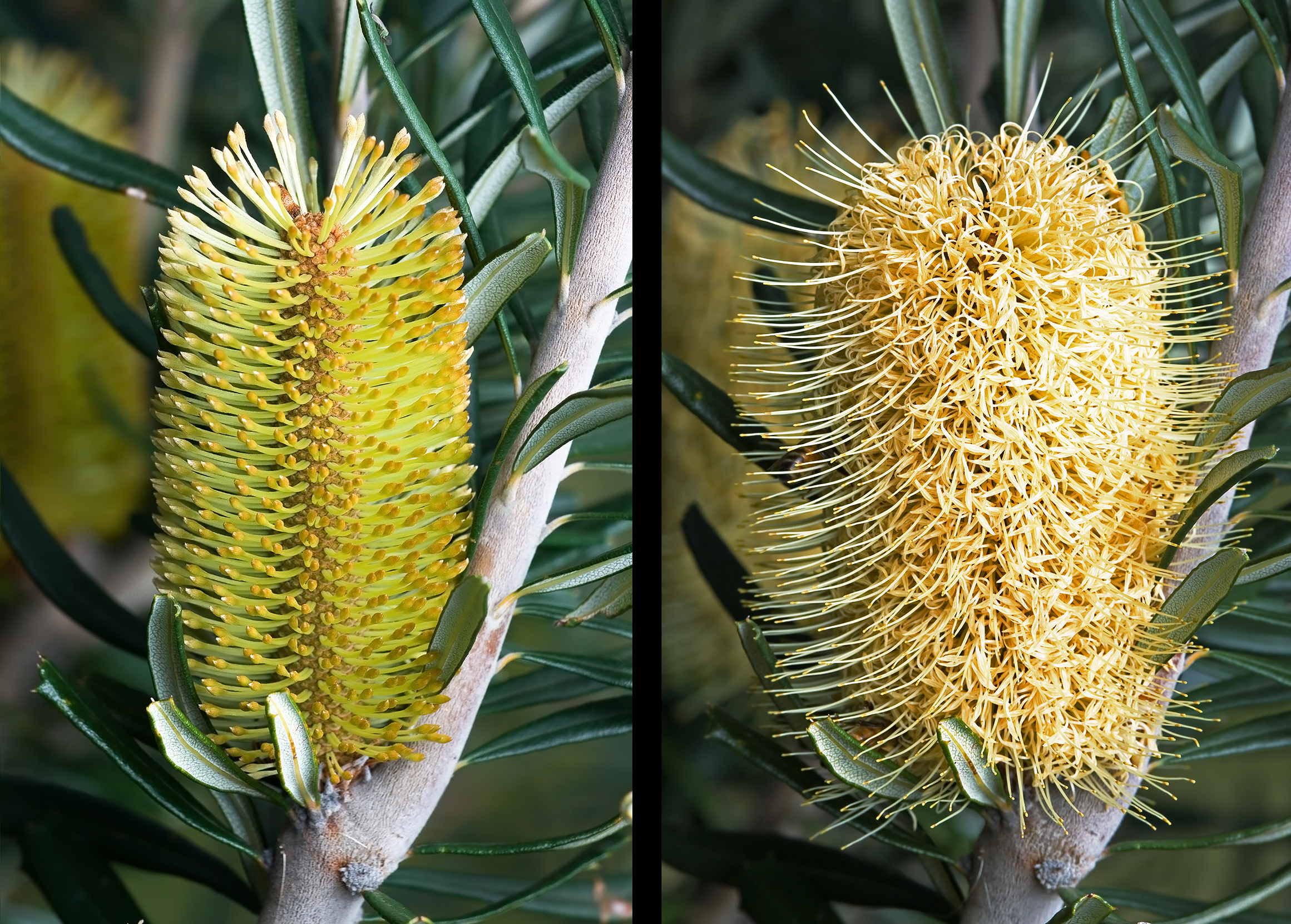
- Inflorescence with unopened buds (left), opened flowers (right)

Conservation status
- Least Concern (IUCN 3.1)

Scientific classification
- Kingdom: Plantae
- Clade: Tracheophytes
- Clade: Angiosperms
- Clade: Eudicots
- Order: Proteales
- Family: Proteaceae
- Genus: Banksia
- Species: B. marginata

Binomial name
- Banksia marginata Cav.
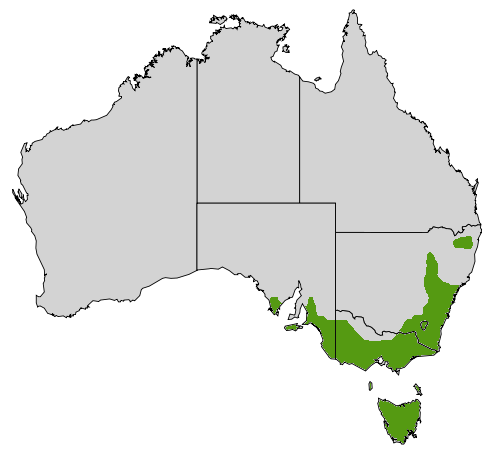
- Distribution of B. marginata across southeastern Australia

Synonyms
- Banksia microstachya Cav.; Banksia depressa R.Br.; Banksia insularis R.Br.; Banksia patula R.Br.; Banksia gunnii Meisn.; Sirmuellera microstachya (Cav.) Kuntze

= Banksia marginata =

Silver banksia

Species of plant found in southeastern Australia

Banksia marginata, commonly known as the silver banksia, is a species of tree or shrub in the family Proteaceae found throughout much of southeastern Australia. It ranges from the Eyre Peninsula in South Australia to north of Armidale, New South Wales, and across Tasmania and the islands of Bass Strait. It grows in various habitats, including Eucalyptus forest, scrub, heathland and moorland. Banksia marginata varies widely in habit, ranging from a 20-centimetre (7.9 in) shrub to a 12-metre (40 ft) tree. The narrow leaves are linear and the yellow inflorescences occur from late summer to early winter. These flower spikes fade to brown and then grey and develop woody follicles bearing the winged seeds. Originally described by Antonio José Cavanilles in 1800, further collections of B. marginata were designated as several separate species by Robert Brown in 1810. However, all were reclassified as a single species by George Bentham in 1870. No distinct subspecies have been recognised by Banksia expert Alex George, who nonetheless concedes that further work is needed.

Many species of bird, in particular honeyeaters, forage at the flower spikes, as do native and European honeybees. The response to bushfire varies. Some populations are serotinous: they are killed by fire and regenerate from large stores of seed, which have been held in cones in the plant canopy and are released after a fire. Others regenerate from underground lignotubers or suckers from lateral roots. Although it has been used for timber, Banksia marginata is most commonly seen as a garden plant, with dwarf forms being commercially propagated and sold.

== Description ==
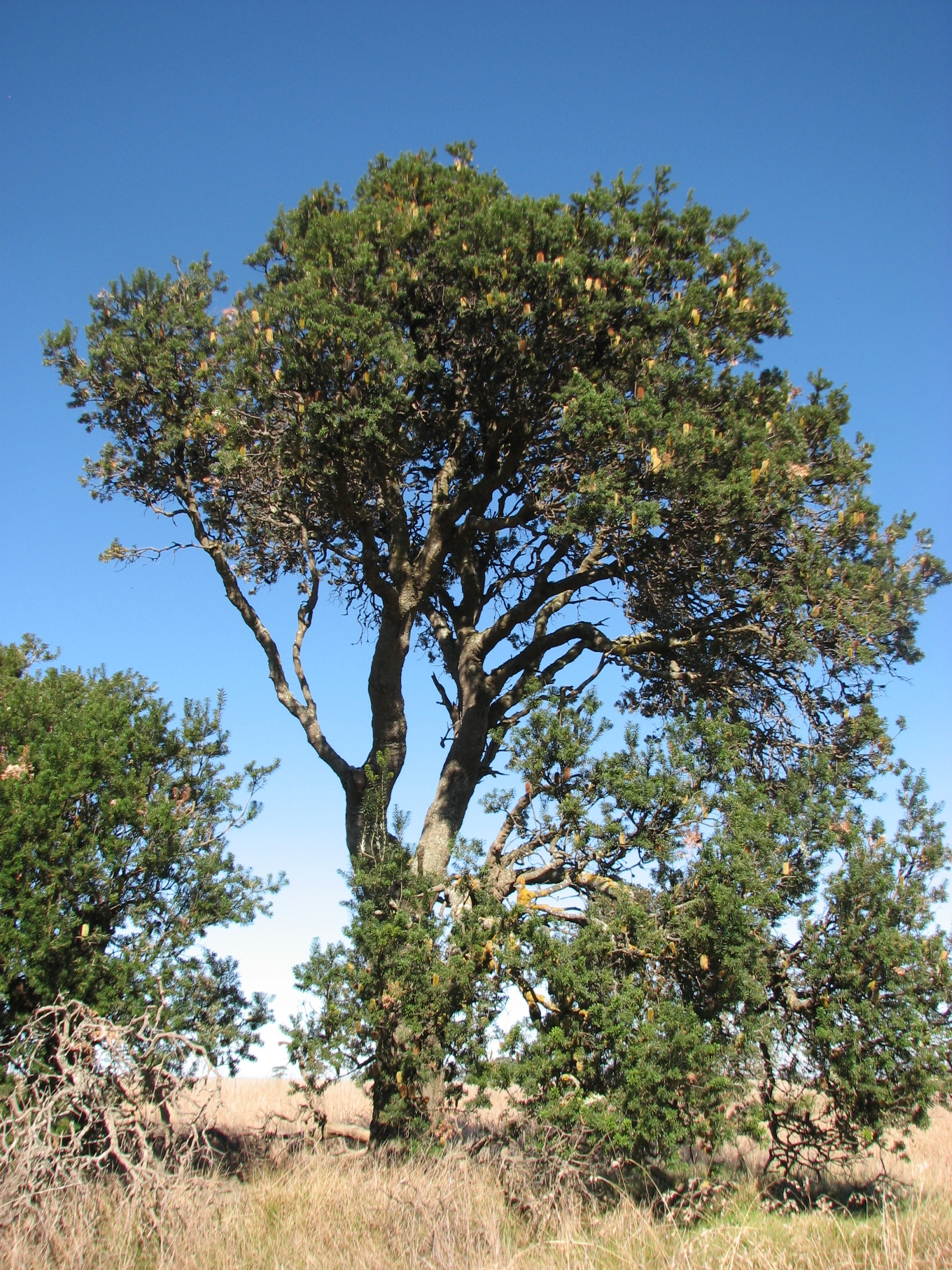
Tree habit, Illabarook Rail Line Nature Conservation Reserve

Banksia marginata is a highly variable species, usually ranging from a small shrub around a metre (3 ft) tall to a 12-metre-high (39 ft) tree. Unusually large trees of 15 to possibly 30 m (50–100 ft) have been reported near Beeac in Victoria's Western District as well as several locations in Tasmania, while compact shrubs limited to 20 cm (7.9 in) high have been recorded on coastal heathland in Tasmania (such as at Rocky Cape National Park). Shrubs reach only 2 m (6.6 ft) high in Gibraltar Range National Park. The bark is pale grey and initially smooth before becoming finely tessellated with age. The new branchlets are hairy at first but lose their hairs as they mature, with new growth a pale or pinkish brown. The leaves are alternately arranged on the stems on 2–5 mm long petioles, and characteristically toothed in juvenile or younger leaves, which are 3–7 cm (1.2–2.8 in) long. The narrow adult leaves are dull green in colour and generally linear, oblong or wedge-shaped (cuneate) and measure 1.5–6 cm (0.6–2.4 in) long and 0.3–1.3 cm (0.1–0.5 in) wide. The margins become entire with age, and the tip is most commonly truncate or emarginate, but can be acute or mucronate. The cellular makeup of the leaves shows evidence of lignification, and the leaves themselves are somewhat stiff. Leaves also have sunken stomates. The leaf undersurface is white with a prominent midrib covered in brownish hairs.

The complex flower spikes, known as inflorescences, appear generally from late summer to early winter (February to June) in New South Wales and Victoria, although flowering occurs in late autumn and winter in the Gibraltar Range. Cylindrical in shape, they are composed of a central woody spike or axis, perpendicularly from which a large number of compact floral units arise. The flower spikes measure 5–10 cm (2–4 in) tall and 4–6 cm (1.6–2.4 in) wide. Pale yellow in colour, they are composed of up to 1,000 individual flowers (784 recorded in the Gibraltar Range) and arise from nodes on branchlets that are at least three years old. Sometimes two may grow from successive nodes in the same flowering season. They can have a grey or golden tinge in late bud. As with most banksias, anthesis is acropetal; the opening of the individual buds proceeds up the flower spike from the base to the top. Over time the flower spikes fade to brown and then grey, and the old flowers generally persist on the cone. The woody follicles grow in the six months after flowering, with up to 150 developing on a single flower spike. In many populations, only a few follicles develop. Small and elliptic, they measure 0.7–1.7 cm (0.3–0.7 in) long, 0.2–0.5 cm (0.1–0.2 in) high, and 0.2–0.4 cm (0.1–0.2 in) wide. In coastal and floodplain populations, these usually open spontaneously and release seed, while they generally remain sealed until burnt by fire in plants from heathland and montane habitats. Each follicle contains one or two fertile seeds, between which lies a woody dark brown separator of similar shape to the seeds. Measuring 0.9–1.5 cm (0.4–0.6 in) in length, the seed is egg- to wedge-shaped (obovate to cuneate) and composed of a dark brown 0.8–1.1 cm (0.3–0.4 in) wide membranous "wing" and wedge- or sickle-shaped (cuneate–falcate) seed proper, which measures 0.5–0.8 cm (0.2–0.3 in) long by 0.3–0.4 cm (0.1–0.2 in) wide. The seed surface can be smooth or covered in tiny ridges, and often glistens. The resulting seedling first grows two obovate cotyledon leaves, which may remain for several months as several more leaves appear. The cotyledons of Banksia marginata, B. paludosa and B. integrifolia are very similar in appearance.

== Taxonomy and naming ==
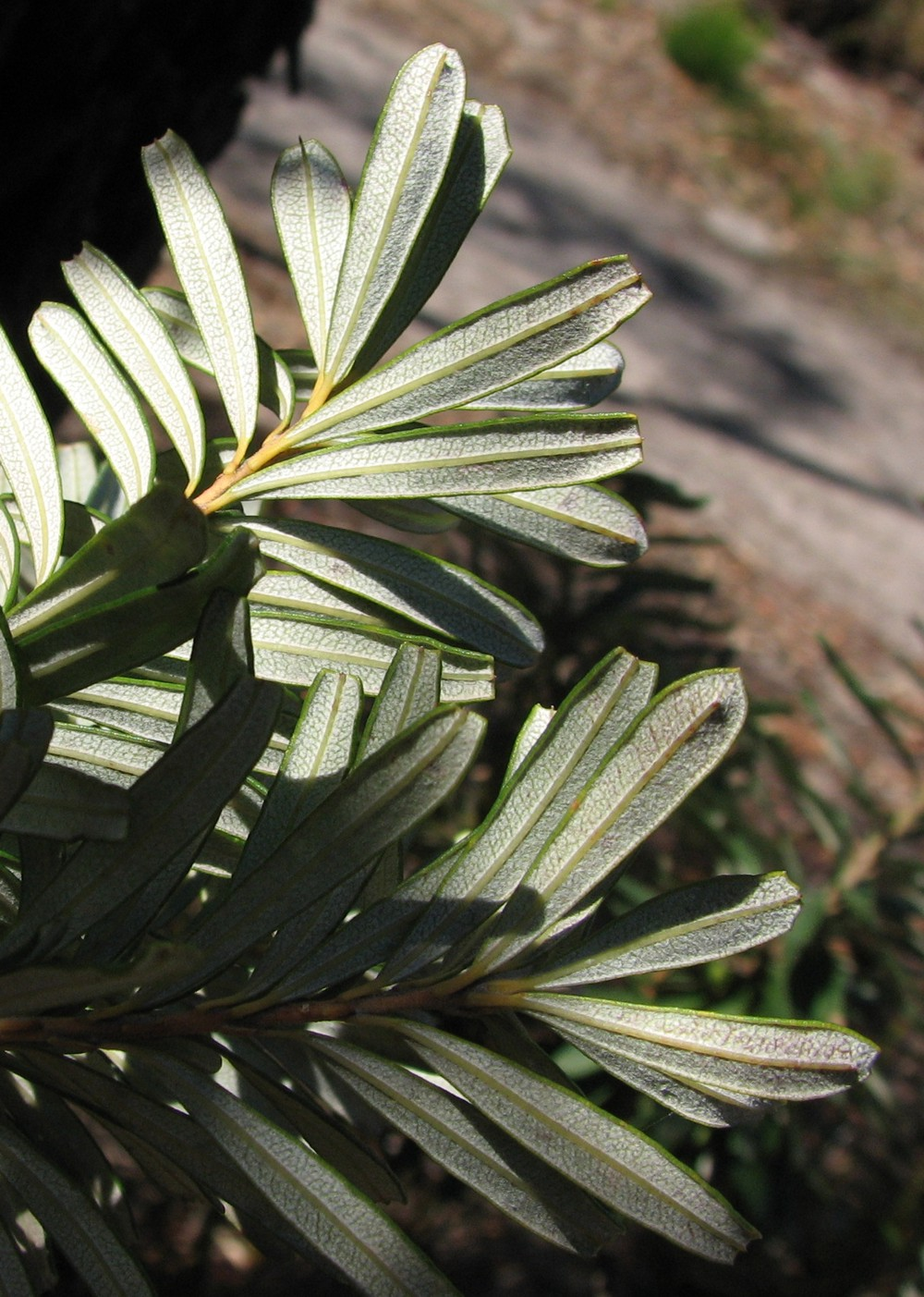
The leaf undersides are white with a prominent midrib. The downcurved margin gives the leaves a bordered appearance which is the inspiration for the species name.

Banksia marginata is commonly called the silver banksia, because the white undersides of its leaves contrast with the otherwise green foliage and give the plant a 'silvery' look. Alternate common names include honeysuckle and dwarf honeysuckle. The aboriginal name in the Jardwadjali language of western Victoria was warock, while the Kaurna name from the Adelaide Plains was pitpauwe and the local name in the Macquarie Harbour region in Tasmania was tangan.

A widely distributed and diverse plant, B. marginata was described independently and given many different names by early explorers. During his third voyage in January 1777, Captain James Cook reported a "most common tree [...] about ten feet high, branching pretty much, with narrow leaves, and a large, yellow, cylindrical flower, consisting only of a vast number of filaments; which, being shed, leave a fruit like a pine top." The genus Banksia was named in honor of Sir Joseph Banks, a botanist who was with Captain Cook during his first voyage (1768–1771) in which he circumnavigated the world, including stops in New Zealand and Australia (Botany Bay). The species marginata was first collected by Luis Née in 1793, from somewhere between Sydney and Parramatta. In 1800, the Spanish botanist Antonio José Cavanilles gave the species the binomial name it still bears today. The species name is the Latin adjective marginatus ('bordered') and refers to appearance of the lower surface of the recurved margins of the leaves when viewed from underneath. Cavanilles also described another specimen collected by Née in the same locality as a different species, Banksia microstachya Cav. A smaller shrub with dentate leaves, this turned out to be an immature plant of the same species with juvenile leaves. Robert Brown described 31 species of Banksia in his 1810 work Prodromus Florae Novae Hollandiae et Insulae Van Diemen, including six taxa (B. marginata α and β plus four further species) now attributable to B. marginata. He split the genus into two subgenera, placing these species in subgenus Banksia verae, the "True Banksias". He described Banksia australis R.Br., giving the location of the collection as Port Phillip Bay in Victoria in 1802 (having crossed out Van Diemen's Land 1804). Brown's other collections which were reduced to synonymy with B. marginata were Banksia depressa R.Br., a prostrate shrub from Margate Rivulet in southeastern Tasmania, Banksia insularis R.Br., from Flinders and King Island, and Banksia patula R.Br., a shrub from the vicinity of Port Lincoln, South Australia. The French naturalist Aimé Bonpland in 1816 called it Banksia marcescens Bonpl., deemed an illegitimate name, as by that time the name Banksia marginata already had been published. Still more synonyms are Banksia ferrea Vent. ex Spreng. and Banksia gunnii Meisn.

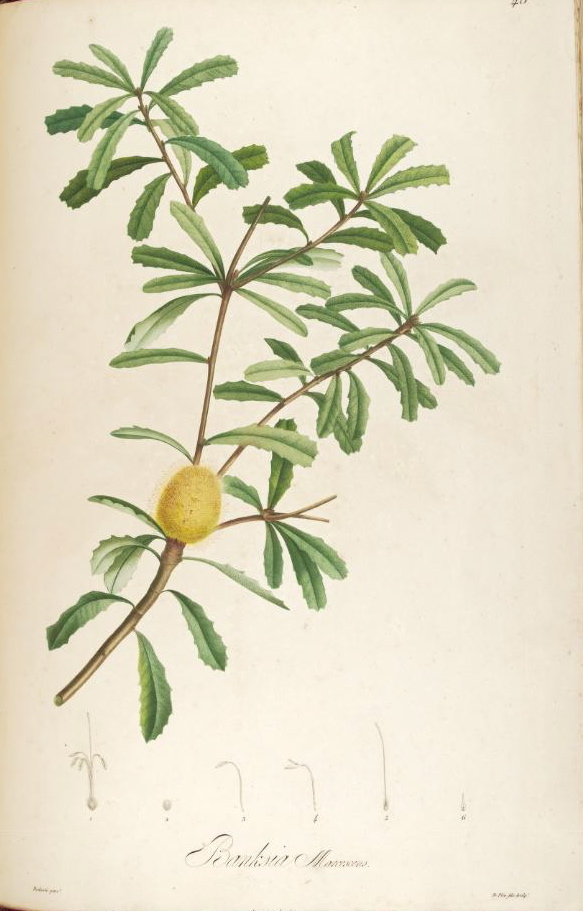
Plate titled Banksia marcescens in Description des plantes rares cultivées à Malmaison et à Navarre by Aimé Bonpland

By the time Carl Meissner published his 1856 arrangement of the genus, there were 58 described Banksia species. Meissner divided Brown's Banksia verae, which had been renamed Eubanksia by Stephan Endlicher in 1847, into four series based on leaf properties. He listed six species and a further four varieties all now sunk into B. marginata in series Salicinae.

In 1870, George Bentham published a thorough revision of Banksia in his landmark publication Flora Australiensis. In Bentham's arrangement, the number of recognised Banksia species was reduced from 60 to 46. Bentham observed that the characteristics Brown used to define B. australis, B. depressa, B. patula, and B. insularis were unable to distinguish separate forms as more specimens came to light, and hence declared them synonyms of B. marginata. Meissner's four series were replaced by four sections based on leaf, style and pollen-presenter characters. B. marginata was placed in section Eubanksia along with B. integrifolia and B. dentata.

=== Placement within Banksia ===
The current taxonomic arrangement of the genus Banksia is based on botanist Alex George's 1999 monograph for the Flora of Australia book series. In this arrangement, B. marginata is placed in Banksia subgenus Banksia, because its inflorescences take the form of Banksia's characteristic flower spikes, section Banksia because of its straight styles, and series Salicinae because its inflorescences are cylindrical. In a morphological cladistic analysis published in 1994, Kevin Thiele placed it as the most basal member of a newly described subseries Integrifoliae, within the series Salicinae. However, this subgrouping of the Salicinae was not supported by George. George did concede that major work is needed on Banksia marginata, which shows such a high degree of variability over its range.

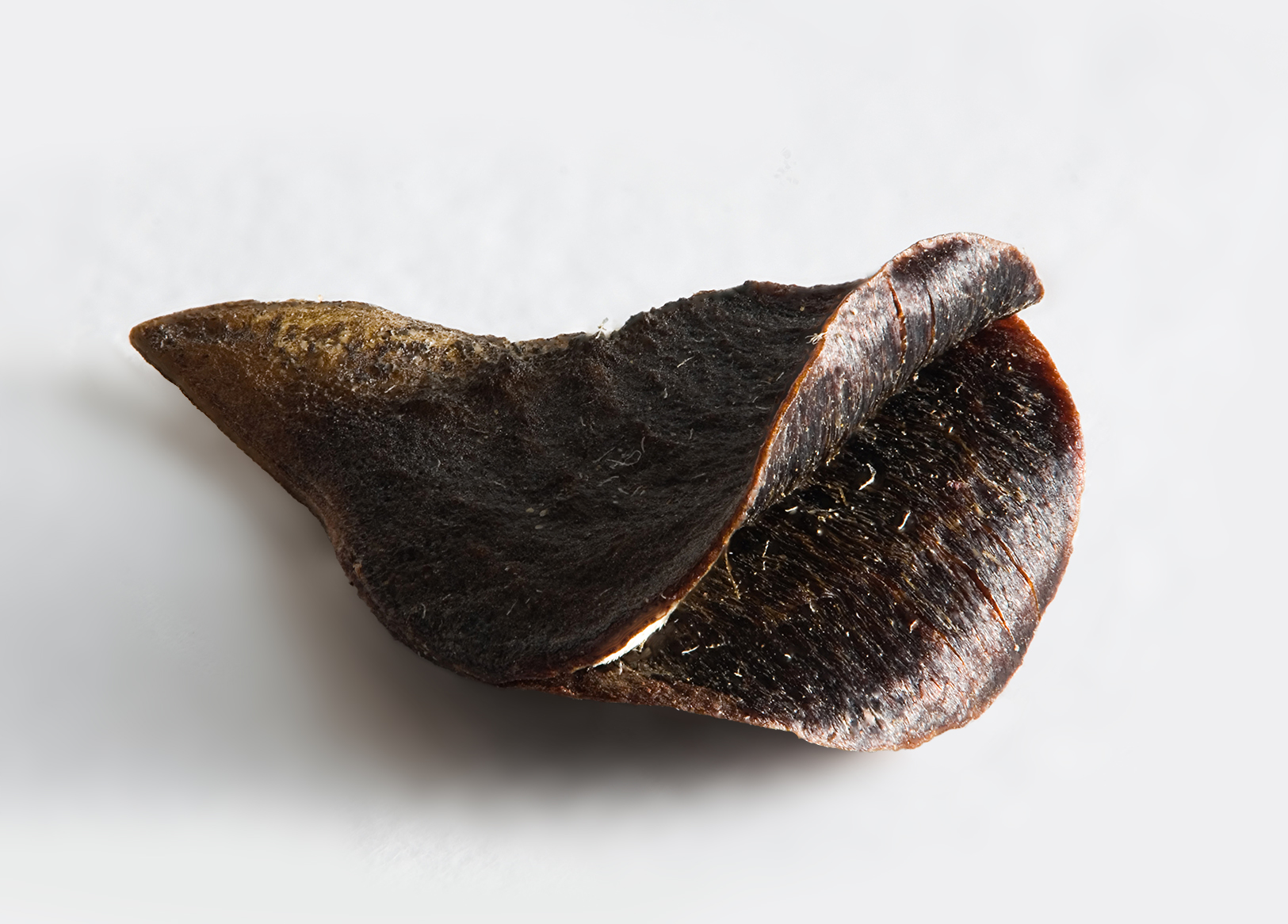
Seed separator of Banksia marginata with winged seeds still nestled against it

B. marginata's placement within Banksia may be summarised as follows:

Genus Banksia

Subgenus Isostylis
Subgenus Banksia

Section Oncostylis
Section Coccinea
Section Banksia

Series Grandes
Series Banksia
Series Crocinae
Series Prostratae
Series Cyrtostylis
Series Tetragonae
Series Bauerinae
Series Quercinae
Series Salicinae

B. dentata – B. aquilonia – B. integrifolia – B. plagiocarpa – B. oblongifolia – B. robur – B. conferta – B. paludosa – B. marginata – B. canei – B. saxicola

Since 1998, American botanist Austin Mast and co-authors have been publishing results of ongoing cladistic analyses of DNA sequence data for the subtribe Banksiinae, which then comprised genera Banksia and Dryandra. Their analyses suggest a phylogeny that differs greatly from George's taxonomic arrangement. Banksia marginata resolves as the closest relative, or "sister", to B. saxicola, the two taxa part of a larger group containing B. paludosa and the three subspecies of B. integrifolia. Early in 2007, Mast and Thiele rearranged the genus Banksia by merging Dryandra into it, and published B. subg. Spathulatae for the taxa having spoon-shaped cotyledons; thus B. subg. Banksia was redefined as encompassing taxa lacking spoon-shaped cotyledons. They foreshadowed publishing a full arrangement once DNA sampling of Dryandra was complete. In the meantime, if Mast and Thiele's nomenclatural changes are taken as an interim arrangement, then B. marginata is placed in B. subg. Spathulatae.

=== Hybrids with other species ===
Hybridisation with Banksia conferta subsp. penicillata at the site of an old abandoned railway between Newnes and Clarence in the Blue Mountains has been recorded; a single B. marginata plant was surrounded by plants with intermediate features but more strongly resembling B. conferta subsp. penicillata. B. marginata can also interbreed with B. paludosa where they are found together. A hybrid with B. saxicola was recorded from Mount William during the Banksia Atlas project.

A purported hybrid with B. integrifolia, thought to be from Cape Paterson on Victoria's south coast, was first described by Alf Salkin and is commercially available in small quantities. It forms an attractive hardy low-growing plant to 1 m (3.3 ft). Salkin observed an intermediate form which occurred in coastal areas where Banksia marginata and B. integrifolia are found together. Calling it the Wilsons Promontory topodeme, he noted that it colonised sand dunes, had leaves similar to but narrower than integrifolia, and had persisting flowers on old spikes but not as persistent as marginata. He had collected this form from Revesby in New South Wales as well as Cape Paterson, and had received reports of similar plants at Marlo and Bemm Rivers. Stands of plants intermediate between B. integrifolia and B. marginata have been recorded near Mallacoota in East Gippsland.

== Distribution and habitat ==
Banksia marginata is found from Baradine and Gibraltar Range National Park in northern New South Wales, southwards into Victoria and South Australia, as well as across Tasmania. It is found on the major islands of Bass Strait, including King, Flinders and Cape Barren Islands. There is one report of a collection from the Springbrook Mountains southwest of Southport in southeastern Queensland. It is extremely rare in southwestern New South Wales. In Victoria, it is predominantly coastal or near-coastal east of Traralgon, but in New South Wales it is absent from coastal areas in the Sydney region. Banksia marginata often grew as a large tree on the basalt plains west of Melbourne, but has almost disappeared. In the vicinity of Adelaide, it was common in the western suburbs on old sand dunes behind the beach foredunes. It remains common in the Adelaide foothills. The annual rainfall over its distribution ranges from 400 to 1,000 mm (16 to 39 in).

In the Gibraltar Range National Park, it is a dominant shrub of open heathland and a non-dominant shrub of closed heath, mostly found in swampy heath associated with sedges. Plants here have some degree of self-compatibility. In the Sydney region, it grows in association with heath banksia (Banksia ericifolia), old man banksia (B. serrata), mountain devil (Lambertia formosa), lance-leaved geebung (Persoonia lanceolata) and dwarf apple (Angophora hispida) in heathland, and with silvertop ash (Eucalyptus sieberi), Blue Mountains ash (E. oreades), Sydney peppermint (E. piperita), scribbly gum (E. haemastoma), Blue Mountains mallee ash (E. stricta), brittle gum (E. mannifera), snow gum (E. pauciflora) and red bloodwood (Corymbia gummifera) in forested areas.

It is widespread as an understory species in medium rainfall eucalypt forests across Victoria, occurring in association with manna gum (Eucalyptus viminalis), narrow-leaf peppermint (E. radiata), messmate (E. obliqua), swamp gum (E. ovata) and brown stringybark (E. baxteri). It is a common shrub, sometimes small tree, in heathy and shrubby forests as well as coastal scrub and heath in part of its range. In South Gippsland, it is generally a shrub which regenerates from a lignotuber or suckers after bushfire and sets few seed. It has been recorded as a low spreading shrub in Croajingolong National Park in East Gippsland. In the Wombat State Forest west of Melbourne, it grows as a 1 to 2 m (3.3 to 6.6 ft) high shrub on less fertile soils, and as a large tree to 8 m (26 ft) on more fertile soils. Few trees remain, having been cleared for agriculture or for fuel. Similarly, further west in the Corangamite region, it is either a tree or suckering shrub.

In Tasmania, Banksia marginata occupies a wide range of habitats, in mixed forest (where it grows as a small tree), buttongrass moorlands, flood plains of the Loddon, Franklin and Huon Rivers, as well as coastal regions. In parts of the west and southwest of Tasmania, the species is dominant within the threatened native vegetation community known as Banksia marginata wet scrub. There is no macrofossil record for the species, so it is unclear whether it is a recent introduction from the mainland or has only recently evolved, although its presence on both the mainland and Tasmania suggests it has been present since the Pleistocene. It grows in coastal habitats that would be occupied by Banksia integrifolia on the mainland.

Banksia marginata grows on a variety of soil types, from clay loams, shale and peaty loams to sandy or rocky soils composed of quartzite, sandstone, limestone or granite, although sandier soils predominate. It is restricted to sandy soils in the Adelaide region. The soil types are of a wide range of pH, from highly acidic soils in the Grampians to alkaline soils in South Australia. Plants have been recorded at altitudes ranging from sea level to as high as 1,200 m (3,900 ft) AHD at Mount Field National Park.

== Ecology ==
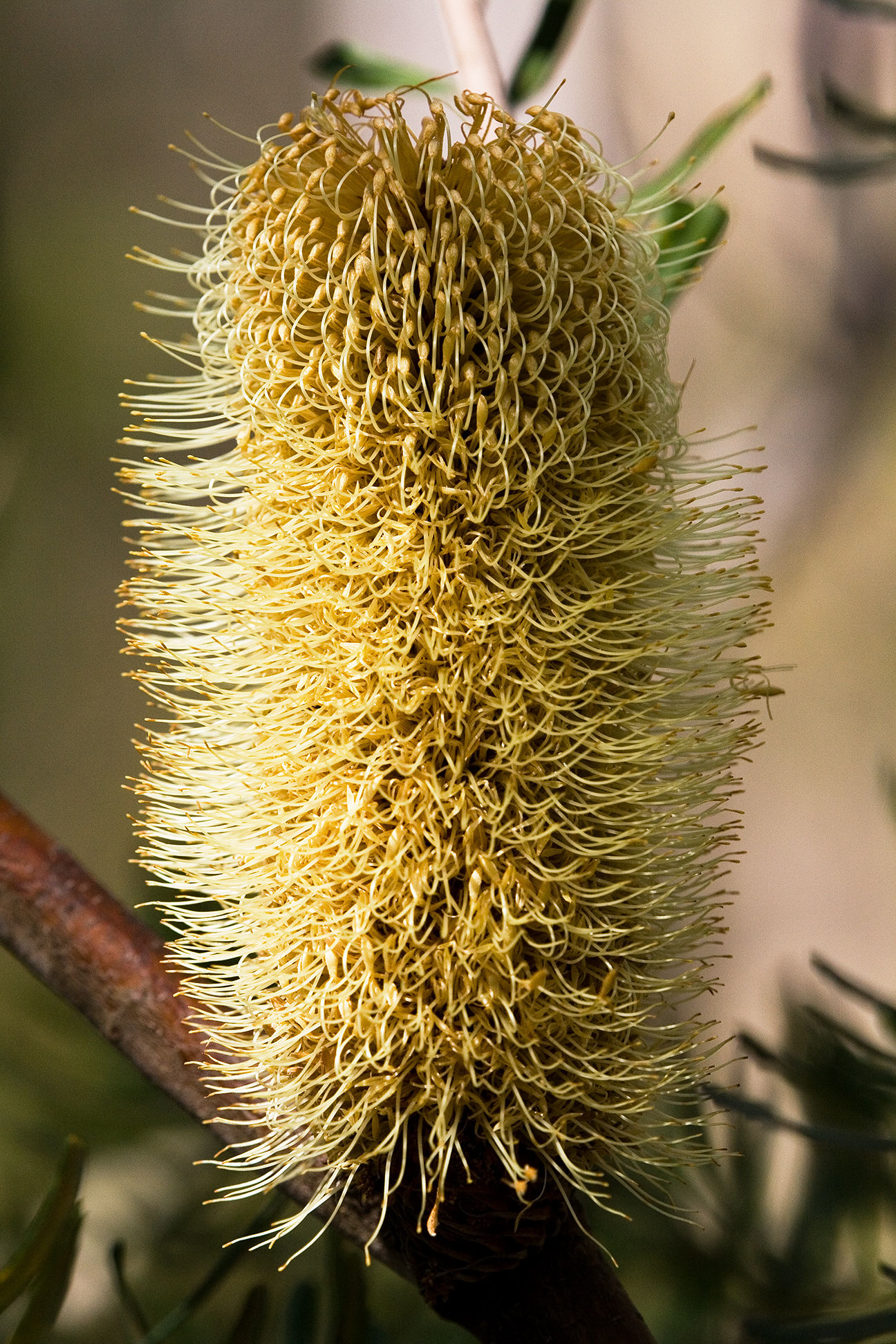
Inflorescence part-way through anthesis, with the individual flowers at the base opened and those further up the spike still closed

Numerous species of birds have been observed foraging and feeding at the flowers; these include rainbow lorikeet (Trichoglossus moluccanus), musk lorikeet (Glossopsitta concinna), purple-crowned lorikeet (Parvipsitta porphyrocephala), double-eyed fig-parrot (Cyclopsitta diophthalma), red wattlebird (Anthochaera carunculata), little wattlebird (A. chrysoptera), yellow wattlebird (A. paradoxa), spiny-cheeked honeyeater (Acanthagenys rufogularis), yellow-faced honeyeater (Caligavis chrysops), singing honeyeater (Gavicalis virescens), white-plumed honeyeater (Ptilotula penicillata), black-chinned honeyeater (Melithreptus gularis), brown-headed honeyeater (M. brevirostris), white-naped honeyeater (M. lunatus), crescent honeyeater (Phylidonyris pyrrhopterus), New Holland honeyeater (P. novaehollandiae), tawny-crowned honeyeater (Gliciphila melanops), eastern spinebill (Acanthorhynchus tenuirostris), noisy miner (Manorina melanocephala), silvereye (Zosterops lateralis) and thornbills (Acanthiza species). In addition, the yellow-tailed black cockatoo (Zanda funerea) feeds on the seed.

The agile antechinus (Antechinus agilis), bush rat (Rattus fuscipes), feathertail glider (Acrobates pygmaeus), and sugar glider (Petaurus breviceps) have been recorded visiting flower spikes. Both pollen and nectar are consumed by the southwestern pygmy possum (Cercarteus concinnus). Ants, bees (both native and European honeybees), blowflies and brown butterflies have been recorded as visitors to flower spikes. The wasp Mesostoa kerri of the subfamily Mesostoinae within the family Braconidae causes stem galls on B. marginata in southeastern South Australia. The galls are either round to a diameter of 3.3 cm (1.3 in), or cigar-shaped to 15 cm (5.9 in). Their effect on the plant is unclear. B. marginata is a host plant for the larval and adult stages of the buprestid beetle Cyrioides imperialis. Much more pathological is the banksia longicorn beetle (Paroplites australis) which bores holes in the base of banksia plants which then weaken and fall or blow over with wind and die. Several species of fungus have been recorded growing on the foliage, including Acrospermum gaubae, Argopericonia elegans, Asterina systema-solare, Botryosphaeria banksiae, a species of Cladosporium, Cooksonomyces banksiae, Dimerium banksiae, Episphaerella banksiae, a Periconiella species, Satchmopsis australiensis, Tryssglobulus aspergilloides, and a species of Veronaea.

All banksias have developed proteoid or cluster roots in response to the nutrient-poor conditions of Australian soils (particularly lacking in phosphorus). The root system of the suckering forms of Banksia marginata in Victoria and South Australia have a characteristic pattern with a deep tap root, and an extensive system of thick lateral roots 7.5–15 cm (3.0–5.9 in) below the surface. During the winter months, segments around 30 cm (0.98 ft) in length develop vegetative buds capable of forming suckers. Clusters of fine proteoid roots up to 15 cm (5.9 in) long arise from these lateral roots.

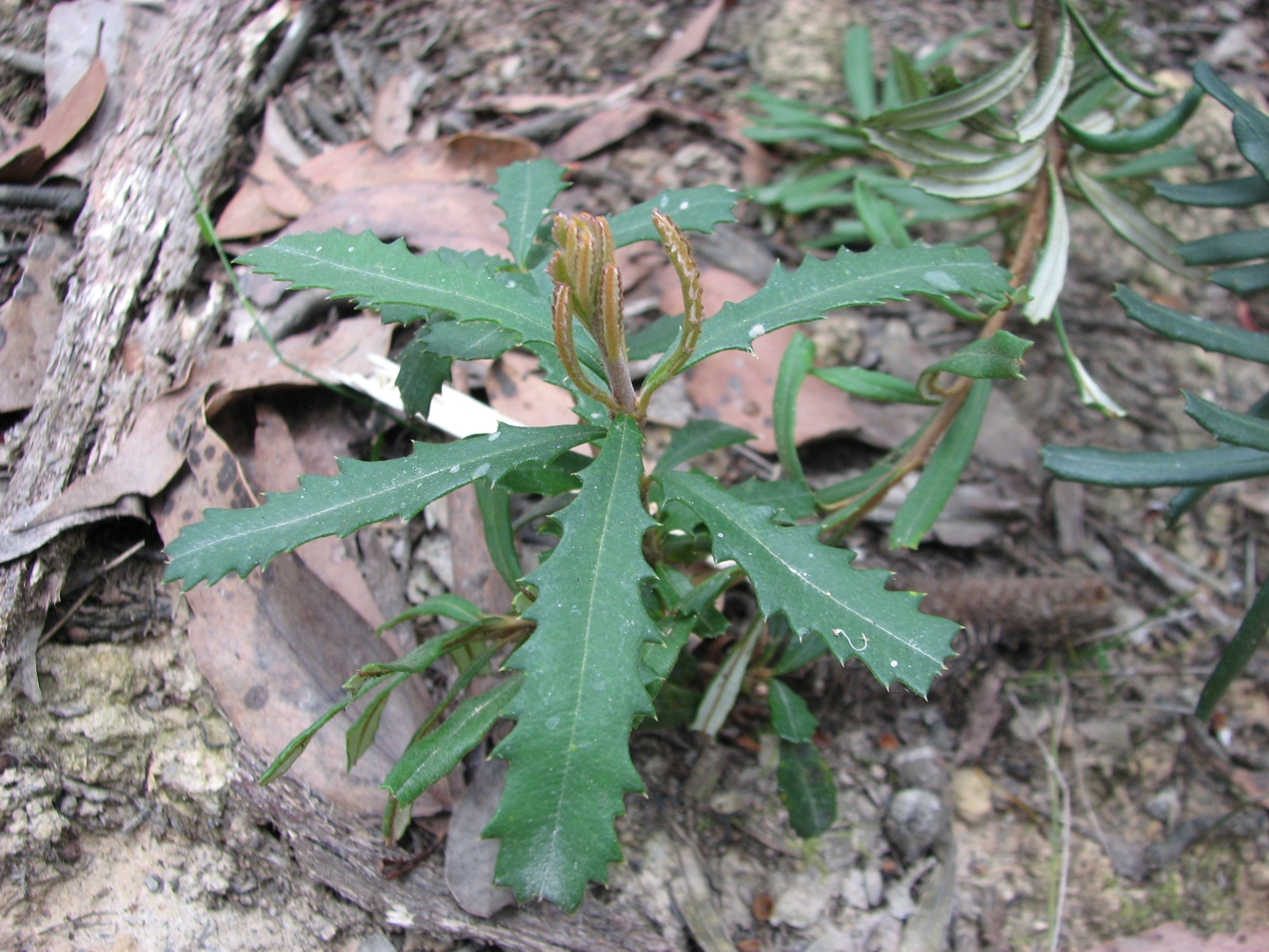
A seedling growing in Wombat State Forest displays the serrated juvenile leaves which are larger and broader than adult ones.

The response of Banksia marginata to fire is variable. In the Gibraltar Range and Sydney regions, plants are killed by fire and regenerate from seed. They are serotinous, storing their seed in old cones, forming a seedbank in their canopy which is released after bushfire. A field study found that seeds were dispersed short distances, generally 8 m (26 ft) or less, with those closest to the parent plant faring the best. In Little Desert National Park in northwestern Victoria and also eastern South Australia, it grows as a low shrub which suckers (grows shoots from lateral roots) after fire. Plants do not appear to live longer than 25 years; after this time the ageing plants begin to die and are succeeded by younger plants arising from suckers around the parent. A field study in Gippsland found counting the nodes of Banksia marginata plants to be accurate in indicating age within a year up to 21 years since the last fire. There is anecdotal evidence of plants reaching 150 years old in this region. Plant species from communities dependent on fire are thought to self-select to be more flammable; Banksia marginata tested from a dry sclerophyll community in southeastern Tasmania was shown to burn readily, and fire would spread easily through it.

Tasmanian forms are frost tolerant at any time of year, which might explain some of their success in spreading and growing in different habitats around the island. This attribute might have allowed them to survive cold periods in Tasmania during the Pleistocene.

A trial in Western Australia showed Banksia marginata to be mildly sensitive to Phytophthora cinnamomi dieback. At Brisbane Ranges National Park west of Melbourne, which was invaded by Phytophthora cinnamomi in the 1970s, Banksia marginata (along with such species as Grevillea steiglitziana) was part of a secondary regrowth of understory species after more resistant shrubs, such as grasses and sedges, had grown back.

== Uses ==
=== Timber ===
The red-hued heartwood is coarse-grained and soft. It is sometimes used for turning, but requires careful drying before use to avoid warping. A sample was prepared in Victoria in 1885 as part of a collection of local timber species under the direction of Government botanist Ferdinand von Mueller. The collection was displayed in various exhibitions, including the Exposition Universelle in Paris in 1889, and is housed at the Melbourne Museum.

=== Cultivation ===
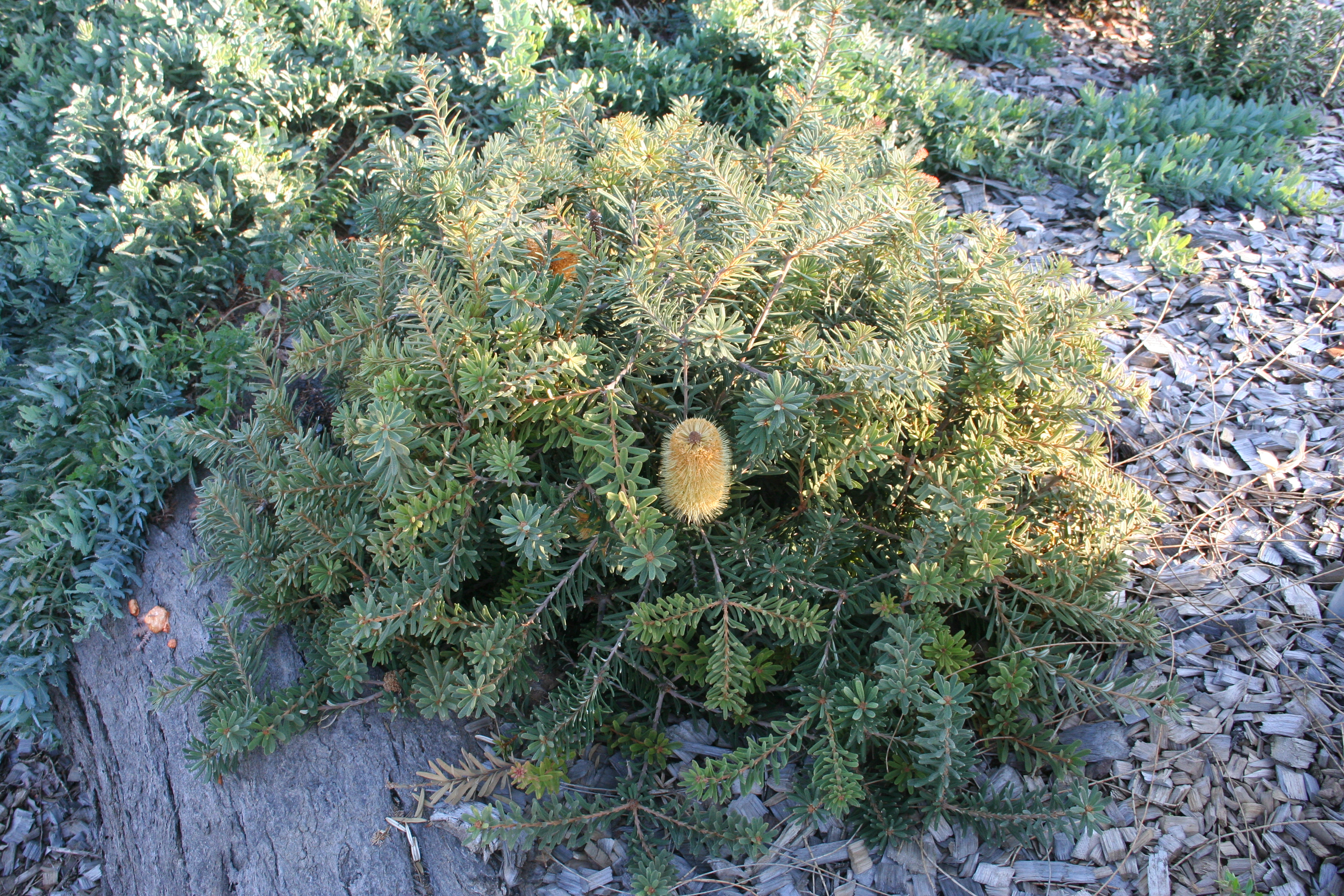
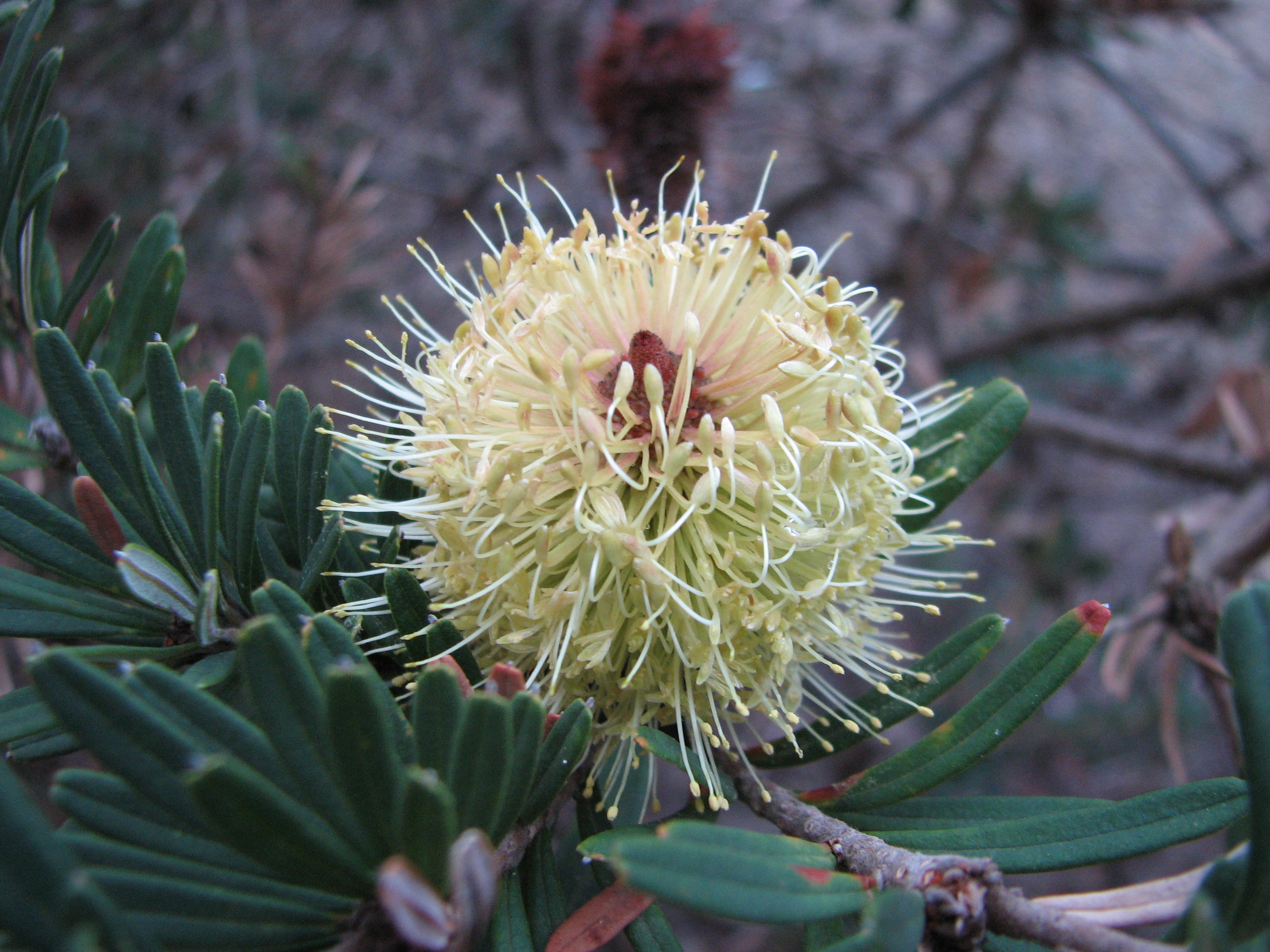
Cultivars 'Mini Marg' (left) and 'Mallacoota Dwarf' (right)

Banksia marginata was first cultivated in England in 1802 (and was also listed as B. australis, B. insularis and B. marcescens). It was grown at Kew, Cambridge Botanic Gardens, Woburn Abbey and private gardens in Chelsea, Hackney and Harringay House. One specimen grown in a glasshouse at Kew was described as a tree 24 feet (7.3 m) high with a trunk girth of two feet (60 cm) at 40 years of age.

B. marginata is generally fairly easy to grow in a well-drained sunny or partly-shaded position in the garden. It can be leggy in shadier positions, or a more compact bushy shrub in full sun. Some varieties from drier areas seem to do poorly in areas of summer humidity. The flowers are not prominent unless they are numerous. Established plants can withstand drought, coastal exposure and temperatures as low as −10 °C (14 °F). Propagation of plants can be by seed or cuttings; the latter is essential if trying to replicate plants of particular habit (such as dwarf specimens). Some Banksia marginata seeds of subalpine provenance require stratification, namely keeping at 5 °C (41 °F) for 60 days before germination takes place over 6 to 25 days. Salkin proposed this was necessary so that seed released in a summer or autumn bushfire would lie dormant over the winter months before germinating in the spring. Banksia saxicola and Banksia canei seed also share this trait.

Some dwarf forms have been commercially available in Australian nurseries, although some selections do not maintain their dwarf status in cultivation. Banksia 'Mini Marg' is a small form selected from the northeastern coast of Tasmania which reaches 30 cm (12 in) high and 1 m (3.3 ft) wide. 'Mallacoota Dwarf' was selected from a natural population at Mallacoota, Victoria. Alf Salkin reported a form from Kanangra Walls with a peach-tinged limb as having horticultural potential, as well as a prostrate form from Cape Liptrap in Victoria. Banksia marginata, and the dwarf cultivar 'Mini Marg', have also been used in bonsai.

== Footnotes ==
=== References ===
- Salkin, Abraham Isaac (Alf) (1979). "Variation in Banksia in Eastern Australia". (MSc thesis). Clayton, Victoria: Monash University.
