= Chalarotona intabescens =

Scientific classification
- Kingdom: Animalia
- Phylum: Arthropoda
- Class: Insecta
- Order: Lepidoptera
- Family: Xyloryctidae
- Genus: Chalarotona
- Species: C. intabescens

Binomial name
- Chalarotona intabescens Meyrick, 1890

Species of moth

Chalarotona intabescens is a moth in the family Xyloryctidae. It was described by Edward Meyrick in 1890. It is found in Australia, where it has been recorded from New South Wales and Queensland.

The wingspan is 16–23 mm. The forewings are clear ochreous yellowish, generally with a cloudy-grey or dark grey dot above the anal angle, which is sometimes obsolete. The hindwings are grey, darker posteriorly.

The larvae tunnel the flower spikes of several Banksia species, including Banksia ericifolia, Banksia integrifolia and Banksia serrata, but also Isopogon anethifolius.
