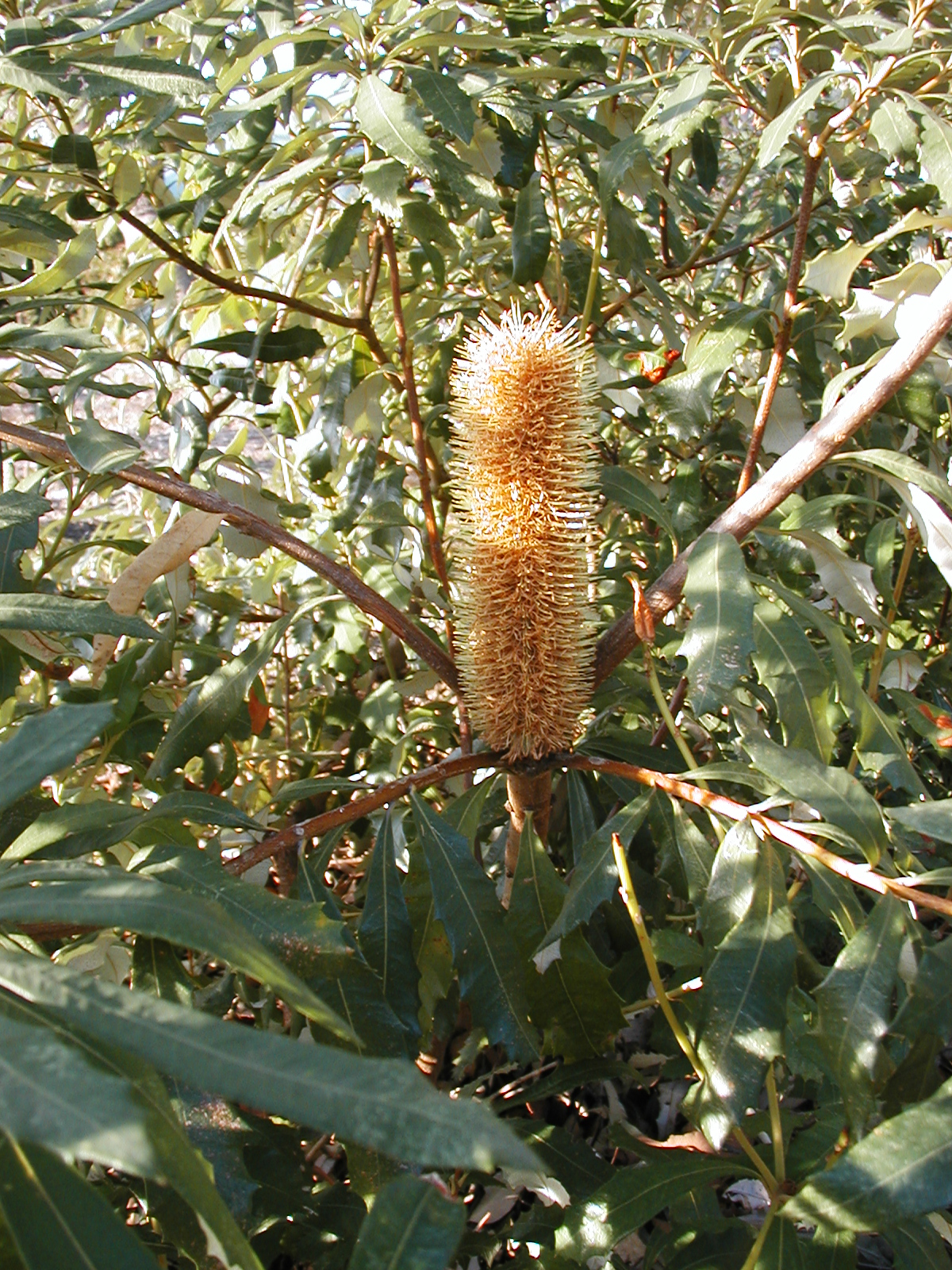
- Banksia paludosa flower spike Stanwell Tops, New South Wales

Conservation status
- Least Concern (IUCN 3.1)

Scientific classification
- Kingdom: Plantae
- Clade: Tracheophytes
- Clade: Angiosperms
- Clade: Eudicots
- Order: Proteales
- Family: Proteaceae
- Genus: Banksia
- Subgenus: Banksia subg. Banksia
- Section: Banksia sect. Banksia
- Series: Banksia ser. Salicinae
- Species: B. paludosa

Binomial name
- Banksia paludosa R.Br.

= Banksia paludosa =

Swamp banksia

Species of shrub native to eastern Australia

Banksia paludosa, commonly known as the marsh or swamp banksia, is a species of shrub in the plant genus Banksia. It is native to New South Wales, Australia, where it is found between Sydney and Batemans Bay, with an isolated population further south around Eden. There are two recognised subspecies, the nominate of which is a spreading shrub to 1.5 m (4.9 ft) in height, and subsp. astrolux is a taller shrub to 5 m (16 ft) high found only in Nattai National Park.

Native mammals, such as the brown antechinus and sugar glider, are important pollinators of B. paludosa. Several species of honeyeaters visit the flower spikes, as do ants and the European honey bee. The response to bushfire depends on the subspecies; subspecies paludosa regenerates from underground lignotubers, while plants of subspecies astrolux are killed by fire and regenerate from large stores of seed which have been held in cones in the plant canopy. B. paludosa is sometimes seen in cultivation, with dwarf forms being registered and sold.

== Description ==
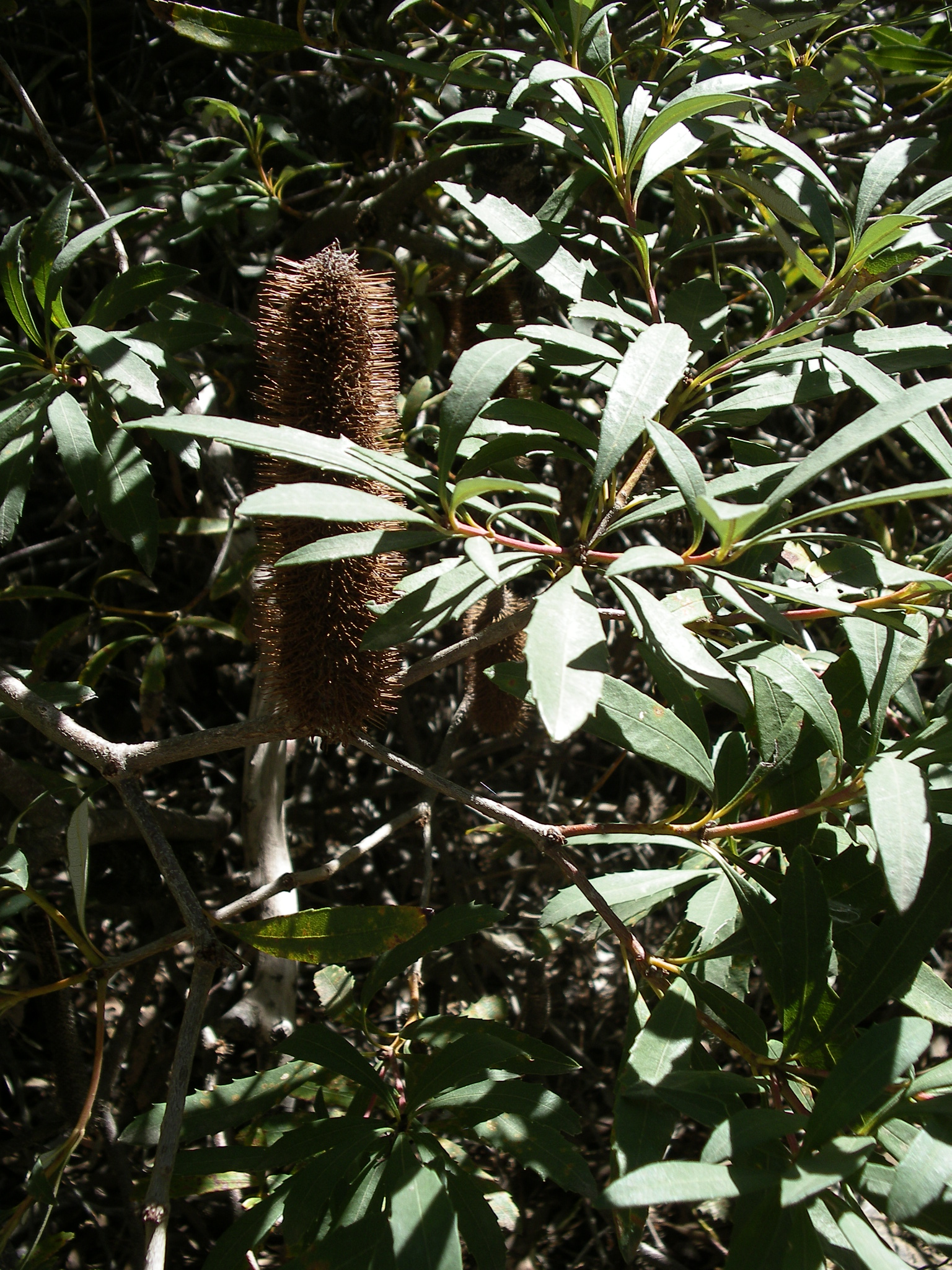
An ageing flower spike, fading to grey at Australian National Botanic Gardens in Canberra. It is arising from a stem at least three years old, evidenced by branching further down the stem.

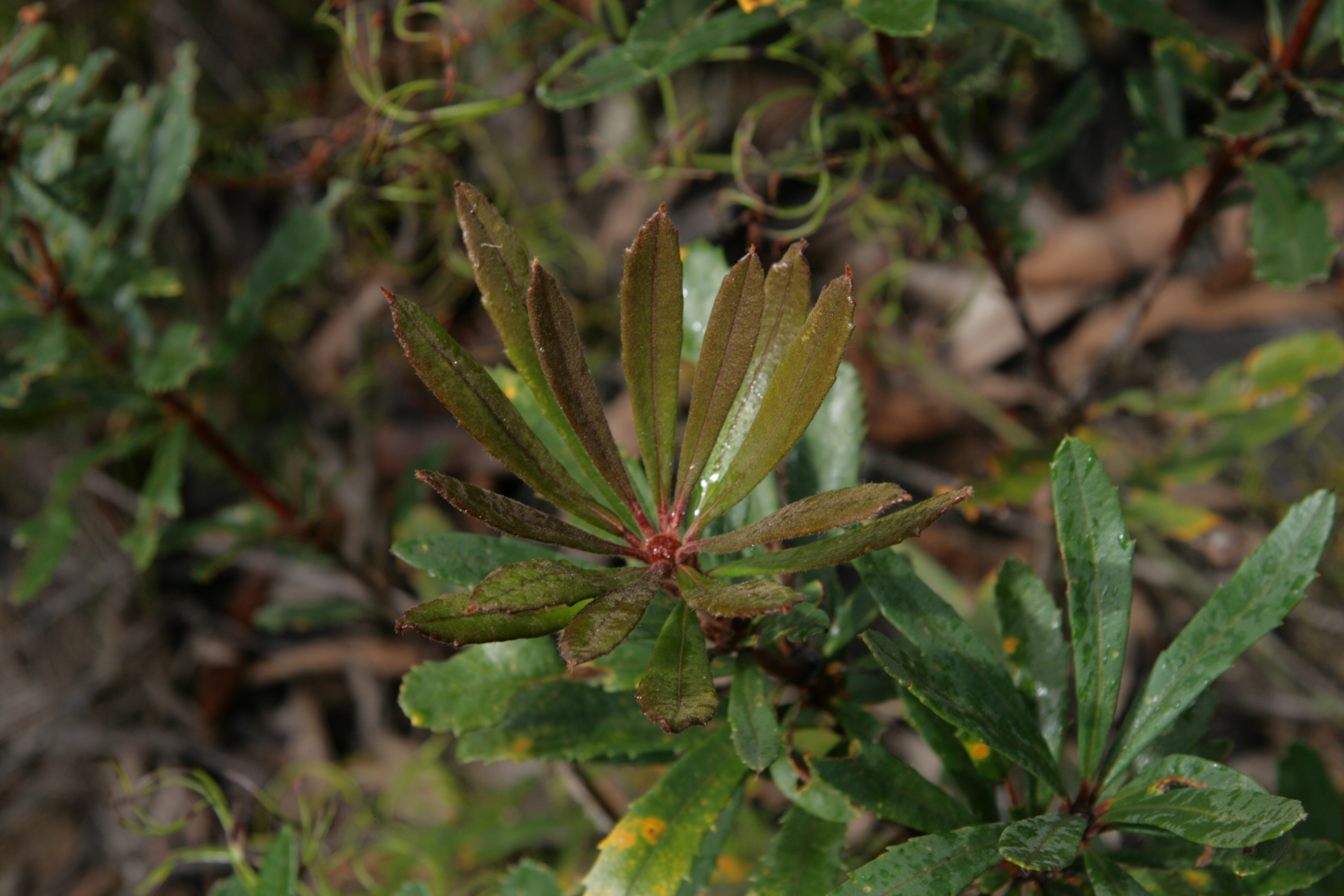
New growth of B. paludosa. Distinctively not hairy unlike B. oblongifolia or B. penicillata. Victoria Falls, Blue Mtns

The two subspecies of Banksia paludosa are identical in foliage and flower, and differ only on their size, habit, and response to bushfire. Banksia paludosa subspecies paludosa is most commonly encountered as a spreading multistemmed shrub generally under 1.5 m (4.9 ft) high, or rarely 2 m (6.6 ft). In heathland habitats such as Nadgee or Barren Grounds Nature Reserves, it may not exceed 1 m (3.3 ft) in height. At an exposed area such as Green Cape, it is reduced further to a 30 cm (12 in) prostrate shrub. This subspecies has a woody base, known as a lignotuber, which begins developing in the first year of life. Banksia paludosa subspecies astrolux is a more open non-lignotuberous shrub which reaches 5 m (16 ft) high.

The bark and foliage is rough and covered in multiplication signs, although the new growth is covered in fine hair. The stems are generally less than 2 cm (0.79 in) in diameter, and may be red or yellow when young. The leaves are alternate or whorled along the stems, and spear- to egg-shaped (lanceolate to obovate) in shape. They measure 4–13 cm (1.6–5.1 in) long and 1–3 cm (0.39–1.18 in) wide. The leaf margins are entire or have occasional serrations. The leaf undersurface is white, with a midrib. Flowering occurs over autumn and winter (April to July) and the flower spikes, known as inflorescences, arise from stems that are three or more years old. Cylindrical in shape, they are composed of a central woody spike or axis from which a large number of compact floral units arise perpendicularly to it, and are generally 3.2–4 cm (1.3–1.6 in) wide and 7–13 cm (2.8–5.1 in) high. The individual flowers are more openly spaced than those of other banksias, and this is especially evident in late bud. This, coupled with the tall thin shape of the flower spike, makes the species quite distinctive. The flower spikes are pale- to golden brown in bud, and open to a more gold colour after anthesis. Variations are seen, one form having a grey limb in bud, and plants with particularly tall flower spikes have been recorded near Huskisson at Jervis Bay. As with most banksias, in anthesis the opening of the individual buds proceeds up the flower spike from the base to the top (acropetal). The process from bud to the finishing of flowering takes six to eight weeks.

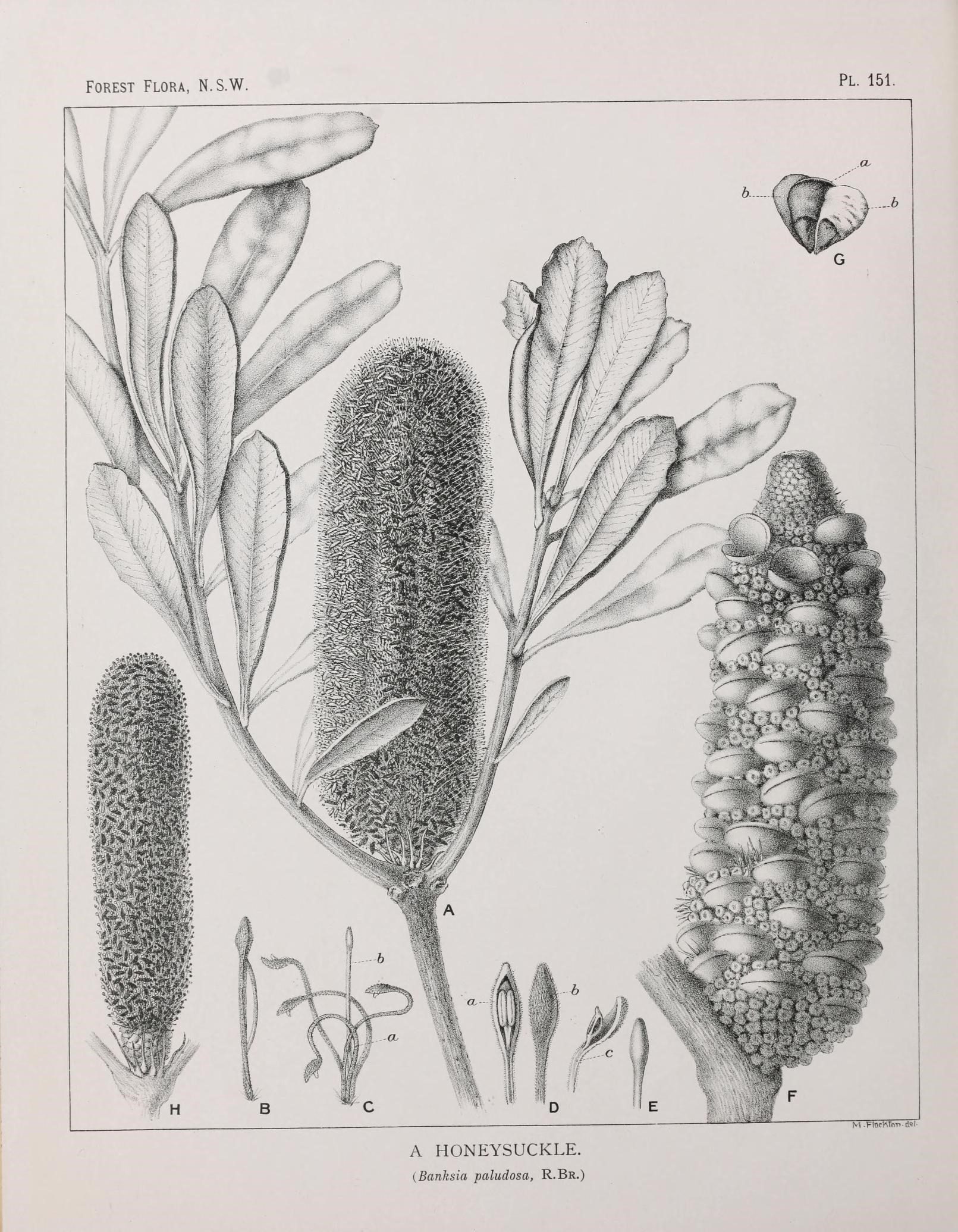
Illustration of Banksia paludosa (plate 151) from The Forest Flora of New South Wales (1913) by J. H. Maiden (Joseph Henry) and Margaret Flockton.

As they age, the flower spikes fade to grey, with the old flowers remaining for years. Up to 60 woody follicles develop on each spike, known in this stage as an infructescence. Narrow and elliptic, they measure 0.9–1.8 cm (0.4–0.7 in) long, 0.1–0.5 cm (0.0–0.2 in) high, and 0.3–0.7 cm (0.1–0.3 in) wide. Some follicles open spontaneously, but most remain closed until burnt by bushfire. Each follicle contains one or two fertile seeds, between which lies a woody dark brown separator of similar shape to the seeds. Measuring 1.3–1.8 cm (0.5–0.7 in) in length, the seed is obovate, and composed of a dark brown 0.8–1.3 cm (0.3–0.5 in) wide membranous "wing" and sickle-shaped (falcate) seed proper which measures 0.8–0.9 cm (0.3–0.4 in) long by 0.3–0.4 cm (0.1–0.2 in) wide. The seed surface can be smooth or covered in tiny ridges, and often glistens. The resulting seedling first grows two asymmetrical obovate cotyledon leaves measuring 0.9 cm (0.4 in) long by 0.7 cm (0.3 in) wide, which may remain for several months as several more leaves appear. The first pairs of leaves are oppositely arranged on the stem, have 3–4 "teeth" on their margins, and are narrowly obovate in shape. They are around 1.2–1.4 cm (0.5–0.6 in), and each following pair of leaves is slightly larger.

The cotyledons of Banksia paludosa, B. marginata and B. integrifolia are very similar in appearance. The foliages of larger shrubs of both Banksia paludosa subspecies resemble those of Banksia conferta subsp. penicillata, but the latter has a wider inflorescence, and the buds are more crowded in appearance on the inflorescence before anthesis. Banksia paludosa also bears a superficial resemblance to B. oblongifolia, but the latter has a prominent midrib on the leaf underside, the new growth is covered in rusty fur, and the old spikes are bare of flowers. The latter grows on dryer rocky soils while the former grows in wetter sandy soils.

== Taxonomy ==
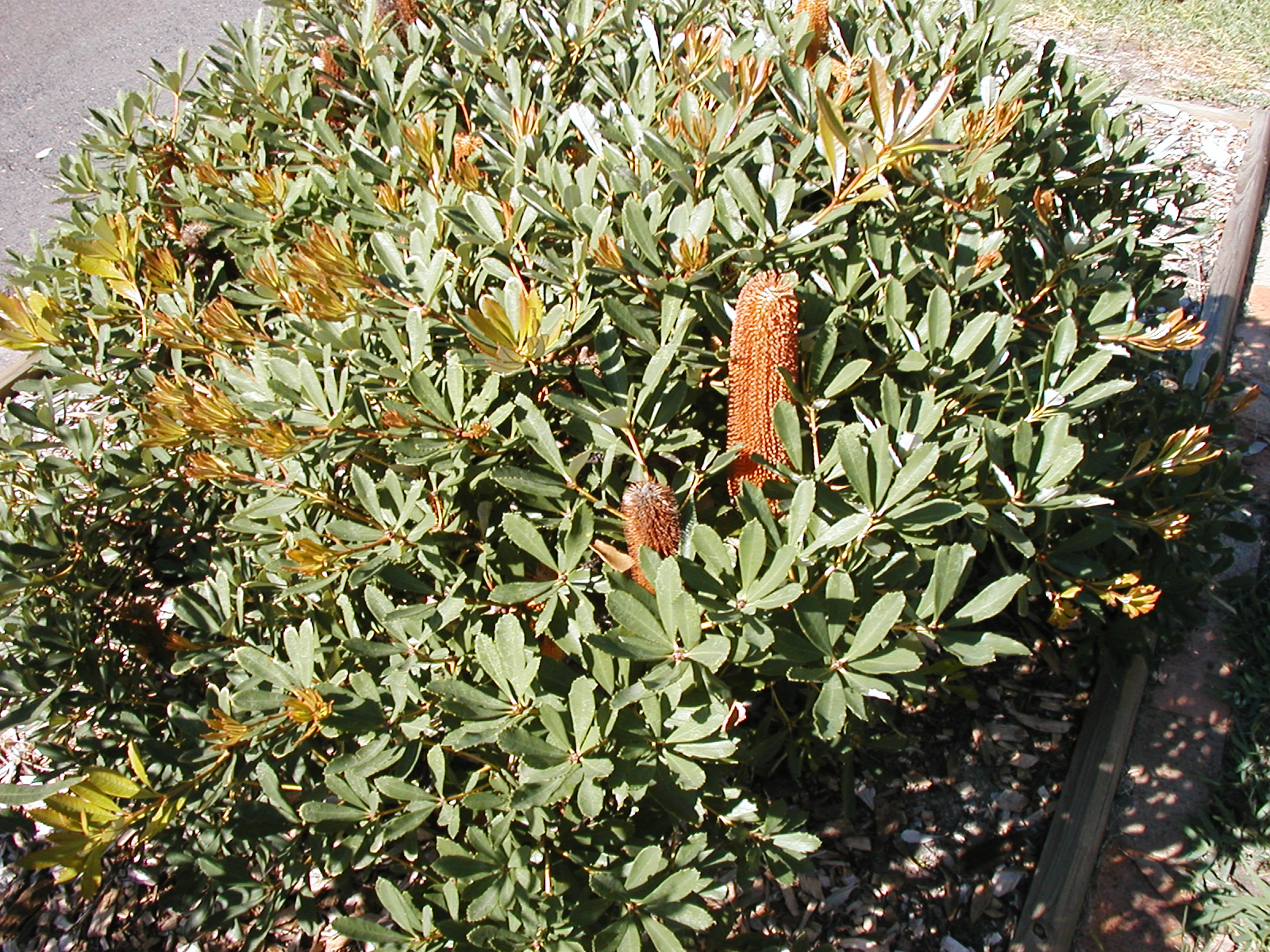
Flower spikes in late bud, displaying open arrangement characteristic of the species, on a shrub less than a metre high in cultivation on a nature strip in Oatley, New South Wales

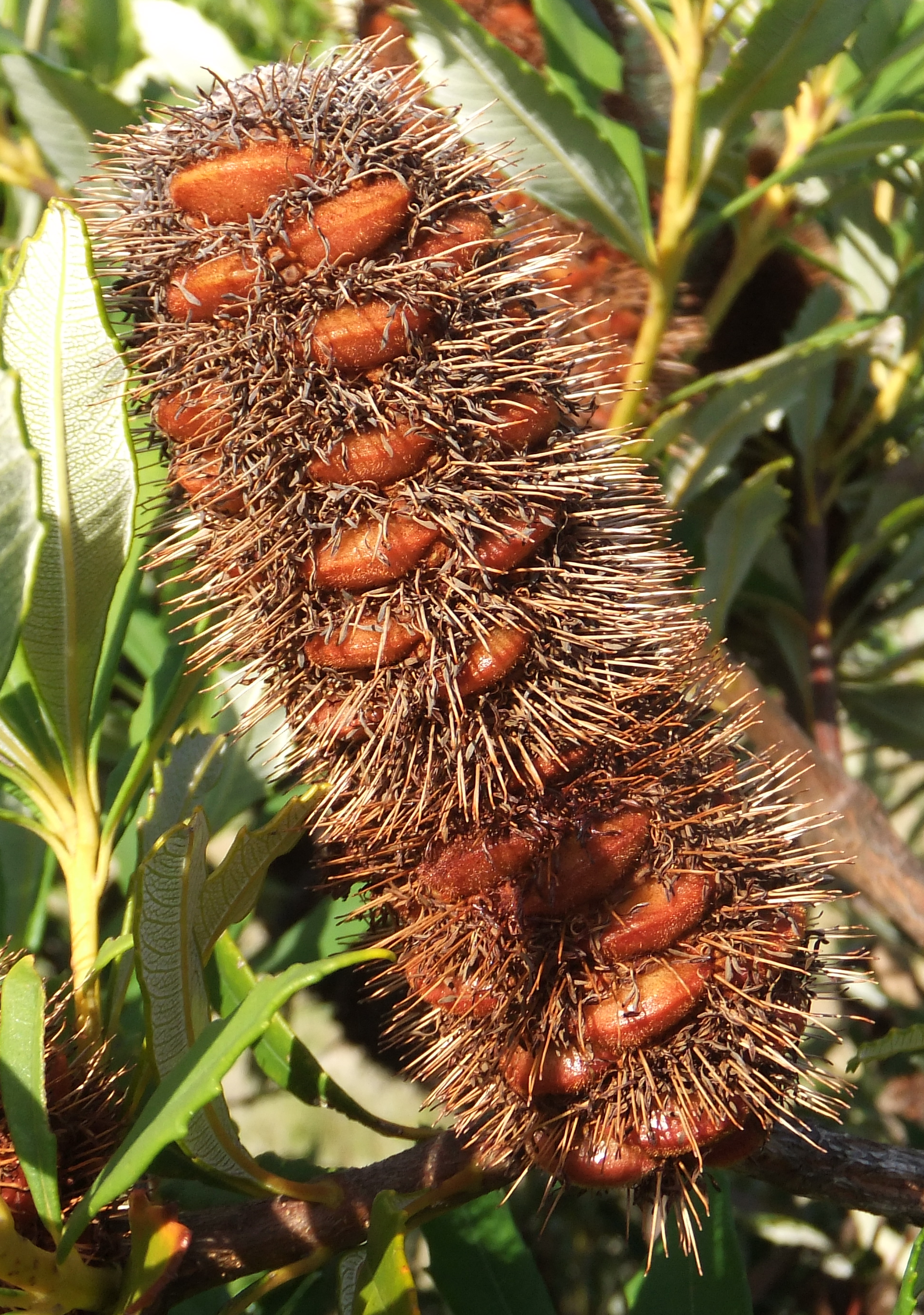
The young follicles are furry on this plant in cultivation at Mt Barker, Western Australia.

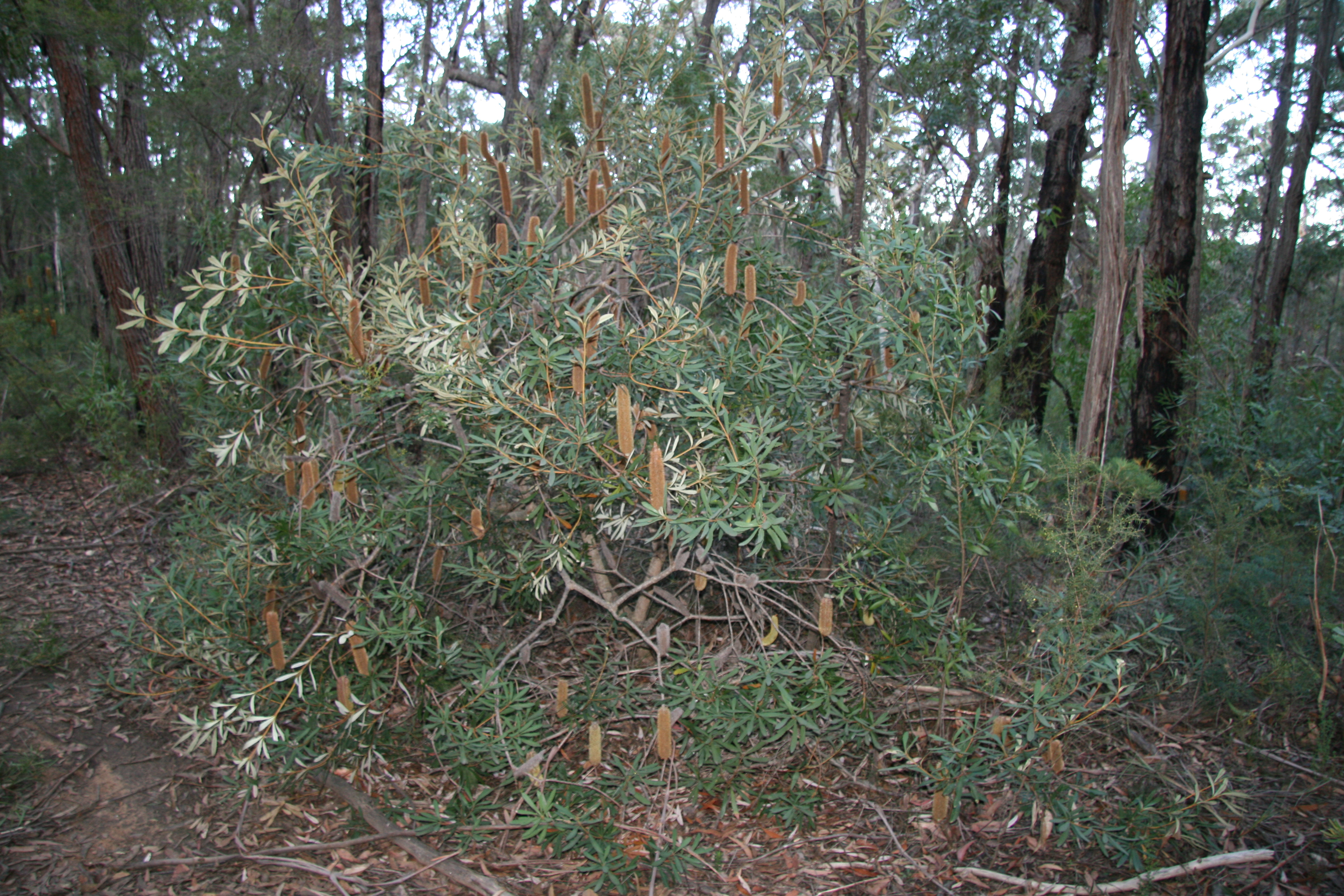
Subspecies astrolux is a larger non-lignotuberous shrub.

Banksia paludosa was first described by Robert Brown in his 1810 On the Proteaceae of Jussieu, and named Banksia paludosa. In 1870, George Bentham demoted it to a variety of B. integrifolia (coast banksia), but in 1981 Alex George restored it to species rank. Its specific epithet is derived from the Latin noun palus "marsh", but is somewhat misleading, as it more often grows on sandstone ridges and heathland. Its common names, marsh banksia and swamp banksia, echo its scientific name.

=== Placement within Banksia ===
The current taxonomic arrangement of the genus Banksia is based on botanist Alex George's 1999 monograph for the Flora of Australia book series. In this arrangement, B. paludosa is placed in Banksia subgenus Banksia, because its inflorescences take the form of Banksia's characteristic flower spikes, section Banksia because of its straight styles, and series Salicinae because its inflorescences are cylindrical. In a morphological cladistic analysis published in 1994, Kevin Thiele placed it in the newly described subseries Integrifoliae, within the series Salicinae. However, this subgrouping of the Salicinae was not supported by George.

B. paludosa's placement within Banksia may be summarised as follows:

Genus Banksia

Subgenus Isostylis
Subgenus Banksia

Section Oncostylis
Section Coccinea
Section Banksia

Series Grandes
Series Banksia
Series Crocinae
Series Prostratae
Series Cyrtostylis
Series Tetragonae
Series Bauerinae
Series Quercinae
Series Salicinae

B. dentata – B. aquilonia – B. integrifolia – B. plagiocarpa – B. oblongifolia – B. robur – B. conferta – B. paludosa – B. marginata – B. canei – B. saxicola

Since 1998, American botanist Austin Mast and co-authors have been publishing results of ongoing cladistic analyses of DNA sequence data for the subtribe Banksiinae, which then comprised genera Banksia and Dryandra. Their analyses suggest a phylogeny that differs greatly from George's taxonomic arrangement. Banksia paludosa resolves as the closest relative, or "sister", to the three subspecies of B. integrifolia. In 2007, Mast and Thiele rearranged the genus Banksia by merging Dryandra into it, and published B. subg. Spathulatae for the taxa having spoon-shaped cotyledons; thus B. subg. Banksia was redefined as encompassing taxa lacking spoon-shaped cotyledons. They foreshadowed publishing a full arrangement once DNA sampling of Dryandra was complete; in the meantime, if Mast and Thiele's nomenclatural changes are taken as an interim arrangement, B. paludosa is placed in B. subg. Spathulatae.

=== Subspecies ===
Two subspecies are recognised. The more widespread subspecies paludosa is a lignotuberous shrub to 1.5 m (4.9 ft) high, while subspecies astrolux, a rare plant known only from the Starlight Trail in Nattai National Park, is a non-lignotuberous shrub which reaches 5 m (16 ft) high. The latter was first recorded by contributors Brian Walters and Kevin Mills for The Banksia Atlas mapping project in the mid-1980s. They initially thought the plants were Banksia conferta subsp. penicillata until they observed the flower spikes typical of B. paludosa. The subspecies was initially termed the Nattai River form of B. paludosa, until it was formally named by George, who coined its species name from the Ancient Greek aster "star" and Latin lux "light", a translation of the place it was found.

Hybrids with Banksia marginata and B. integrifolia have been recorded at Nadgee Nature Reserve, where all three species occur. A study of an area of extensive hybridization between B. robur and B. oblongifolia at Barren Grounds Nature Reserve revealed some plants with morphology suggestive of B. paludosa in their parentage, and requiring further investigation.

== Distribution and habitat ==
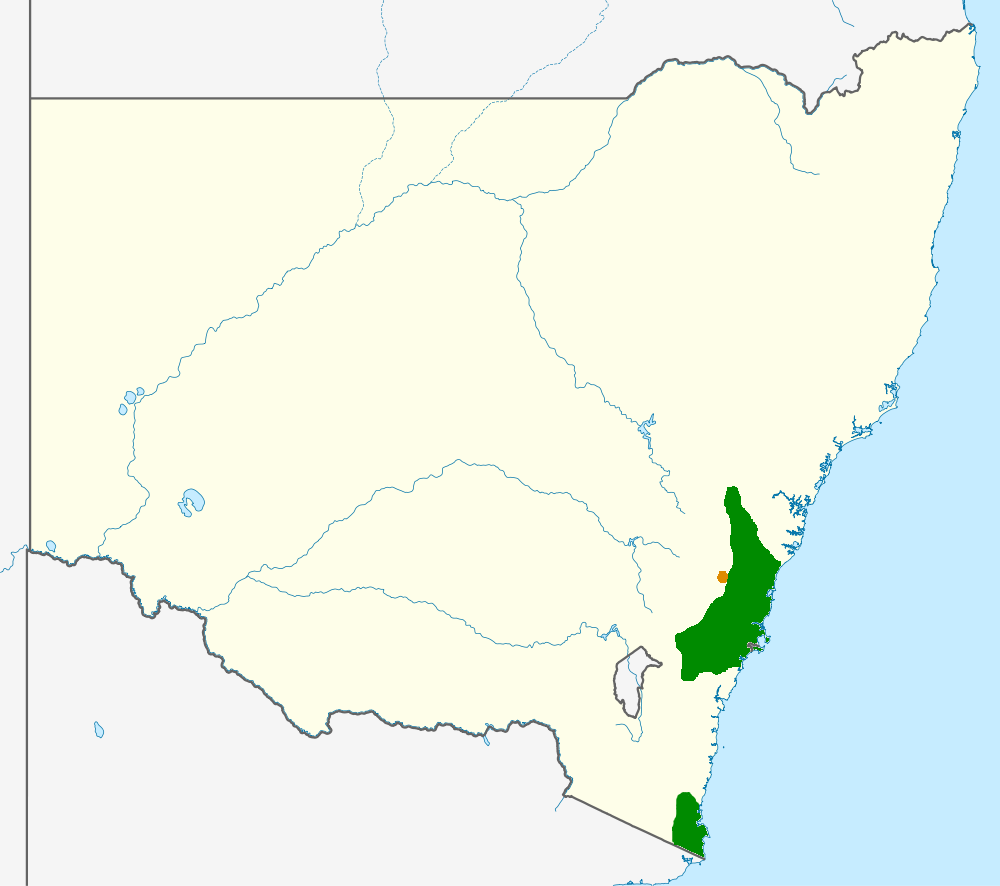
Distribution of Banksia paludosa. Subspecies paludosa is in green and subspecies astrolux in orange.

Both subspecies of Banksia paludosa are endemic to New South Wales. The nominate subspecies paludosa is found from Glen Davis through to the Sydney region and then south to Ulladulla on the South Coast, with a separate population in the vicinity of Eden just north of the Victorian border. It occurs inland as far as Taralga on the Southern Tablelands. It was collected in 1966 from Hat Head on the Mid North Coast by Lawrie Johnson, but has not been found there since despite field work in the area. This record aside, the northernmost historical coastal record is from what is now Centennial Park and La Perouse in Sydney's eastern suburbs, where it is now locally vanished. Subspecies astrolux is restricted to Nattai National Park in the Southern Highlands.

Both subspecies grow in nutrient-poor well-drained sandstone soils, in open woodland with trees such as Sydney peppermint (Eucalyptus piperita), silvertop ash (E. sieberi), grey gum (E. punctata), narrow-leaved stringybark (E. sparsifolia), red bloodwood (Corymbia gummifera) and smooth-barked apple (Angophora costata), and in heathland with species such as dwarf banksia (Banksia oblongifolia), coral heath (Epacris microphylla), and dagger hakea (Hakea teretifolia).

== Ecology ==
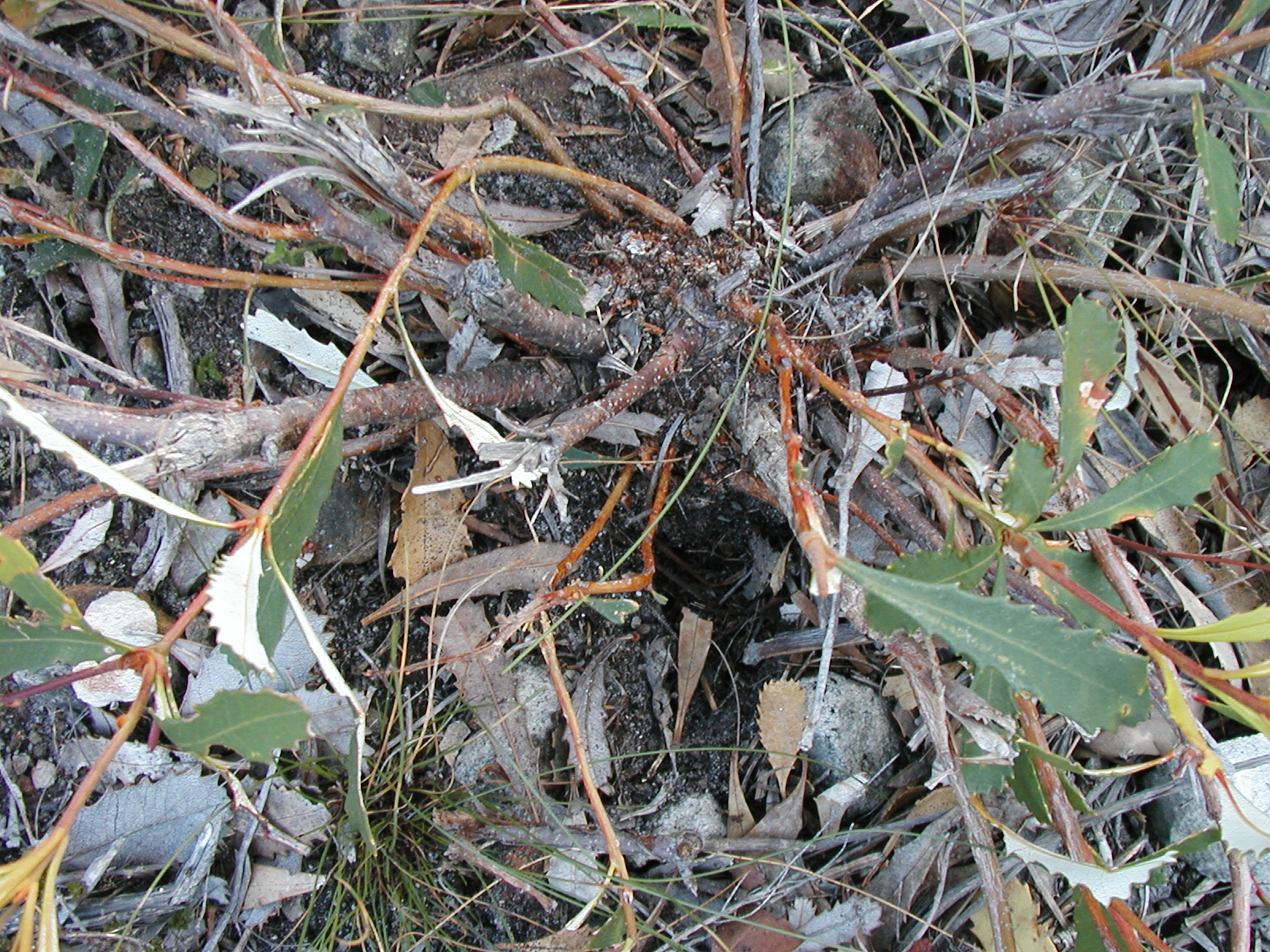
The woody base, known as a lignotuber, of Banksia paludosa subspecies paludosa, with many stems arising, and buds, Vincentia, New South Wales

Banksia paludosa subspecies paludosa is a slow-growing shrub which regenerates from bushfire by resprouting from its lignotuber. After fire, plants take around three years to flower significantly, but are flowering well by five years afterwards. Flowerhead numbers dwindle by fourteen years post bushfire. Plants are estimated to live to around 60 years of age. Seedlings also appear from seed dispersed after bushfire. All banksias have developed proteoid or cluster roots in response to the nutrient-poor conditions of Australian soils (particularly lacking in phosphorus).

The flower spikes of B. paludosa are unable to self-pollinate and require pollinators to set seed. A 1988 isozyme study showed very high rates of outcrossing; pollen from one plant is well-mixed among other plants in the locale. Nonflying mammals are important pollinators in heathland habitat, with the brown antechinus (Antechinus stuartii) a frequent visitor to flower spikes. The sugar glider (Petaurus breviceps) is another mammal pollinator. Bird species that have been observed foraging and feeding at the flowers include the red wattlebird (Anthochaera carunculata), yellow-faced honeyeater (Lichenostomus chrysops), white-eared honeyeater (L. leucotis), crescent honeyeater (Phylidonyris pyrrhoptera), New Holland honeyeater (P. novaehollandiae), and eastern spinebill (Acanthorhynchus tenuirostris). Insects recorded visiting flower spikes include the European honey bee and ants.

== Cultivation ==
Banksia paludosa was first introduced into cultivation in England in 1805. The species was grown at Kew, Cambridge Botanic Gardens, Woburn Abbey, Loddiges nursery in Hackney, John Miller's nursery in Bristol and George Hibbert's garden at Clapham Common. It was also grown in the Villa San Donato in Italy, in the collection of Anatoly Nikolaievich Demidov, 1st Prince of San Donato.

B. paludosa is cultivated in Australian gardens, and does best with a sunny aspect and good drainage, in soils with a pH from 5.5 to 7.5. Slow growing, it flowers in 6 to 10 years from seed. It can be propagated by seed, which take around two weeks to germinate, or cutting. Low growing coastal (dwarf) forms which grow to 60 cm (2.0 ft) are also commercially available, and should be propagated by cutting to preserve features. Noting the flower spikes to be "rather dull", plant author John Wrigley has described the species as "not a spectacular garden plant", although its foliage has been described as "attractive". A form from Jervis Bay with large orange flower spikes was deemed by amateur botanist and banksia enthusiast Alf Salkin to have horticultural potential.
