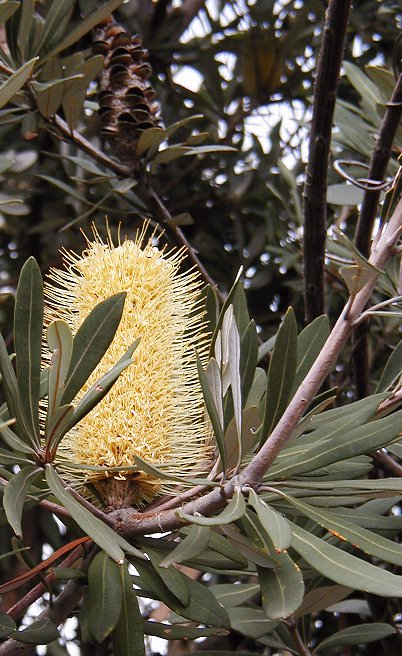
- Banksia integrifolia subsp. integrifolia

Scientific classification
- Kingdom: Plantae
- Clade: Tracheophytes
- Clade: Angiosperms
- Clade: Eudicots
- Order: Proteales
- Family: Proteaceae
- Genus: Banksia
- Subgenus: Banksia subg. Banksia
- Section: Banksia sect. Banksia
- Series: Banksia ser. Salicinae
- Species: B. integrifolia

Binomial name
- Banksia integrifolia L.f.

Subspecies
- B. i. subsp. integrifolia; B. i. subsp. compar; B. i. subsp. monticola

Synonyms
- B. i. var. minor Meisn.; Sirmuellera integrifolia (L.f.) Kuntze; Isostylis integrifolia (L.f.) Britten

= Taxonomy of Banksia integrifolia =

Banksia integrifolia

Classification of a tree species

The taxonomy of Banksia integrifolia has a long and complex history, the result of confusion caused by the species' great variability, and similarities with some closely related species. The existence of hybrids between B. integrifolia and related species as well as early attempts to classify the species based on dried specimen material have also contributed to the confusion.

The species is divided into three subspecies: B. i. subsp. compar, B. i. subsp. integrifolia, and B. i. subsp. monticola. Recent molecular studies support this division.

Until recently, B. integrifolia's taxonomic placement within the genus was largely settled, with the species placed in Banksia subg. Banksia sect. Banksia ser. Salicinae. DNA analyses have now cast doubt upon this arrangement and the publication of a new arrangement based on phylogenetic considerations has been foreshadowed.

== Background ==
Banksia integrifolia, commonly known as the coast banksia, is one of the most widely distributed Banksia species. It occurs between Victoria and Central Queensland in a broad range of habitats, from coastal dunes to mountains. It is highly variable in form, but is most often encountered as a tree up to 25 metres (82 ft) in height. Its leaves have dark green upper surfaces and white undersides, a contrast that can be striking on windy days.

A hardy and versatile Australian native plant, B. integrifolia is widely planted in domestic gardens. Within its natural distribution it is a popular choice in parks, streetscapes, bush revegetation and stabilisation of dunes. Its hardiness has prompted research into its suitability for use as a rootstock in the cut flower trade, but has also caused concerns about its potential to become a weed outside of its natural habitat.

== Discovery ==
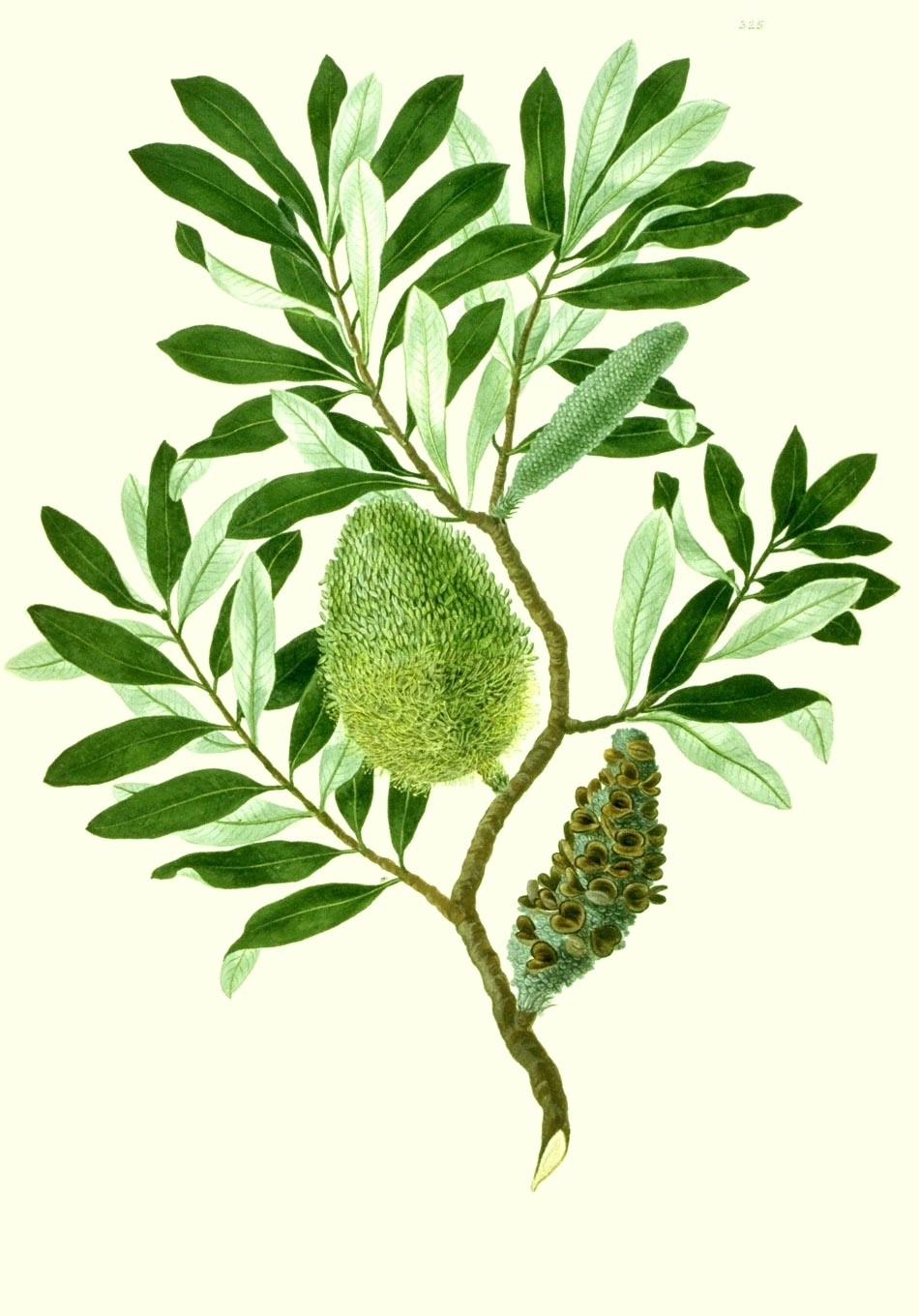
B integrifolia from Banks' Florilegium.

The first botanical collection of B. integrifolia was made by Sir Joseph Banks and Dr Daniel Solander, naturalists on the Endeavour during Lieutenant (later Captain) James Cook's first voyage to the Pacific Ocean. Cook landed on Australian soil for the first time on 29 April 1770, at a place that he later named Botany Bay in recognition of "the great quantity of plants Mr Banks and Dr Solander found in this place". Over the next seven weeks, Banks and Solander collected thousands of plant specimens, including the first specimens of a new genus that would later be named Banksia in Banks' honour.

Every specimen collected during the Endeavour voyage was sketched by Banks' botanical illustrator Sydney Parkinson. On the Endeavour's return to England in July 1771, Banks' specimens became part of his London herbarium, and artists were employed to paint watercolours from Parkinson's sketches. Banks had plans to publish his entire collection as "Banks' Florilegium", but for various reasons the project was never completed, and it would be ten years before any of the Banksia species were formally published.

== Early taxonomic history ==
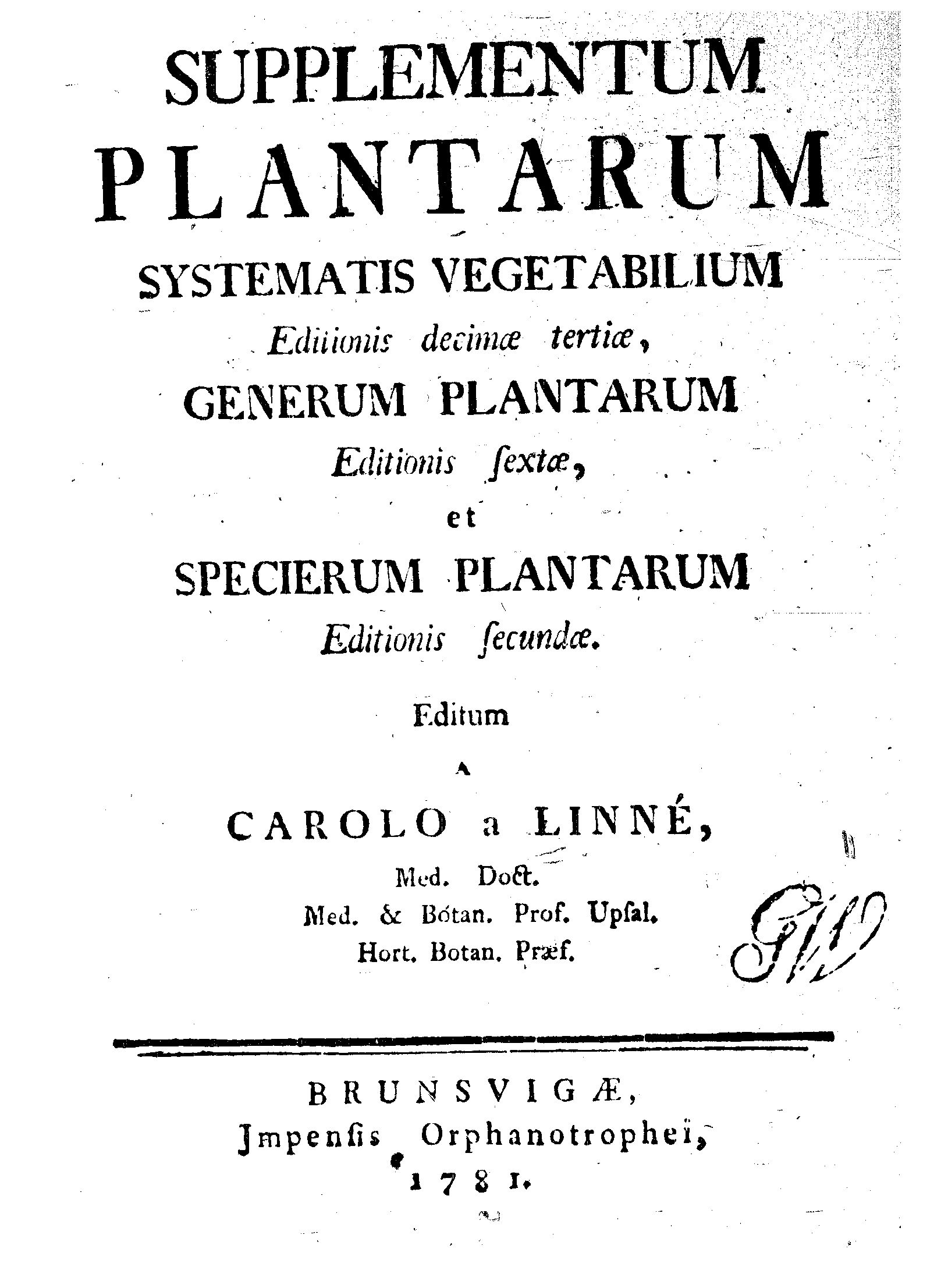
B. integrifolia was first described by Carolus Linnaeus the Younger in his April 1782 publication Supplementum Plantarum.

The genus Banksia was eventually described by Carolus Linnaeus the Younger in his April 1782 publication Supplementum Plantarum. Linnaeus described four Banksia species, distinguishing them by their leaf shape, and naming them accordingly. Thus the species with entire leaf margins was given the specific name integrifolia, from the Latin integer, meaning "entire", and folium, meaning "leaf". The full name of the species is therefore "Banksia integrifolia L.f."

Then followed by two centuries of variations to the taxonomic limits of B. integrifolia. The first sign of confusion was in 1788, when Joseph Gaertner published B. spicata. Gaertner did not specify his type material for the taxon, but contemporary material labelled as such clearly belongs to what is now known as B. i. subsp. integrifolia. In 1810, Robert Brown relegated the name to synonymy with B. integrifolia, and it remained so until 1981 when Alex George refined it to a synonym of the autonym B. i. var. integrifolia.

In 1800, Antonio José Cavanilles published a number of new Banksia species based on specimens collected at Port Jackson, New South Wales in 1797 by Luis Née, botanist to the Alejandro Malaspina expedition. These included B. oblongifolia, B. oleifolia and B. glauca. The last two of these were declared synonyms of B. integrifolia by Robert Brown in 1810, and refined to synonyms of B. i. subsp. integrifolia by George in 1999. The first was ascribed to B. i. var. oblongifolia by Karel Domin in 1930, but this was overturned by George in 1981, and B. oblongifolia remains a current species name.

In 1810, Robert Brown described 31 known species of Banksia in his Prodromus Florae Novae Hollandiae et Insulae Van Diemen. He split the genus into two subgenera, placing B. integrifolia in subgenus Banksia verae, the "True Banksias". New species described by Brown included B. compar, which is now considered a subspecies of B. integrifolia, and B. paludosa, a close relative of B. integrifolia which was for a time considered a variety of it.

By the time Carl Meissner published his 1856 arrangement of the genus, there were 58 described Banksia species. Meissner divided Brown's Banksia verae, which had been renamed Eubanksia by Stephan Endlicher in 1847, into four series based on leaf properties. He placed B. integrifolia in series Salicinae, and further divided it into three varieties: B. i. var. minor for specimens with small, entire leaves; B. i. var. major for specimens with larger, somewhat dentate leaves; and B. integrifola var dentata for specimens with very large dentate leaves. However, the second of these varieties was based upon a specimen of B. integrifolia with juvenile leaves, and the last was B. robur. All three were overturned by George in 1981.

In 1870, George Bentham published a thorough revision of the Banksia in his landmark publication Flora Australiensis. In Bentham's arrangement, Meissner's four series were replaced by four sections based on leaf, style and pollen-presenter characters. B. integrifolia was placed in section Eubanksia along with B. marginata and B. dentata. The number of recognised Banksia species was reduced from 60 to 46, with B. compar declared a synonym of B. integrifolia, and B. paludosa relegated to a variety of B. integrifolia. The former taxon is now considered a subspecies of B. integrifolia, but B. paludosa has since been reinstated as a species and remains a current species name.

In 1891, Otto Kuntze, in his Revisio Generum Plantarum, rejected the generic name Banksia L.f., on the grounds that the name Banksia had previously been published in 1776 as Banksia J.R.Forst & G.Forst, referring to the genus now known as Pimelea. Kuntze proposed Sirmuellera as an alternative, referring to this species as Sirmuellera integrifolia. For the same reason, James Britten transferred the species to the genus Isostylis as Isostylis integrifolia in 1905. These applications of the principle of priority were largely ignored, and Banksia L.f. was formally conserved and Sirmuellera rejected in 1940.

== 20th century ==
In 1913, Frederick Bailey promoted Brown's B. compar, which had been declared a synonym of B. integrifolia by Bentham in 1870, to variety rank as B. i. var. compar. This would be the first infraspecific taxon of B. integrifolia to achieve widespread acceptance. The variety was promoted to subspecies rank by Kevin Thiele in 1994, and B. i. subsp. compar remains a current taxon to date. Under modern botanical nomenclature rules, the publication of subspecies B. i. subsp. compar automatically created the autonym B. i. subsp. integrifolia, to encompass the type material.

The most recent classical taxonomic treatment of Banksia first appeared in Alex George's 1981 monograph The genus Banksia L.f. (Proteaceae). In addition to revising the existing nomenclature, George published a number of new species and subspecies, including a new variety of B. integrifolia, namely B. i. var. aquilonia. This was promoted to subspecific rank by Thiele in 1994, and in 1996 George promoted it to specific rank as Banksia aquilonia.

A third subspecific taxon of B. integrifolia has its roots in Gwen Harden's 1991 publication Flora of New South Wales. Harden recognised a new subspecies of B. integrifolia, but did not give it a name, referring to it only as "B. i. subsp. A". Three years later, Thiele confirmed the subspecific rank of this taxon, naming it B. i. subsp. monticola.

In 1996, Kevin Thiele and Pauline Ladiges published a new arrangement for Banksia after cladistic analyses yielded a cladogram significantly different from George's arrangement. Thiele and Ladiges' arrangement retained B. integrifolia in series Salicinae, but divided the series into two subseries: B. subser. Integrifoliae and B. subser. Acclives. The seven members of subseries Integrifoliae all appear to be closely related, and natural hybrids have been recorded between members where they co-occur. This arrangement stood until 1999, when George effectively reverted to his 1981 arrangement in his monograph for the Flora of Australia series. He argued that there was insufficient evidence for the division, and that "B. dentata is clearly allied to B. integrifolia, not to the very distinctive B. robur".

=== George's arrangement ===
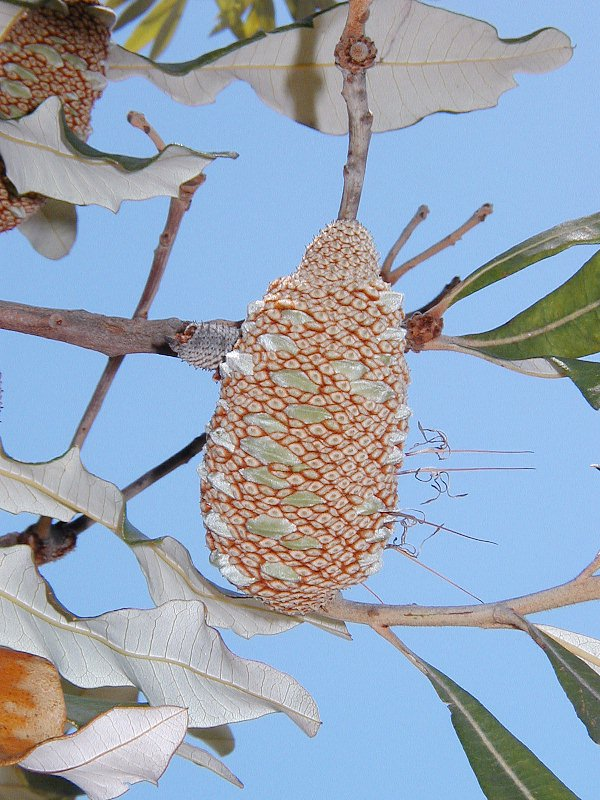
Whether B. dentata (pictured) is more closely allied to B. integrifolia or B. robur is currently a bone of contention.

Until recently, the accepted taxonomic arrangement for Banksia was that published in George's 1999 monograph for the Flora of Australia series. In this arrangement, B. integrifolia is placed in Banksia subg. Banksia because its inflorescences take the form of Banksia's characteristic flower spikes; Banksia sect. Banksia because of its straight styles; and Banksia ser. Salicinae because of its cylindrical inflorescences .

B. integrifolia's placement within George's taxonomic arrangement of Banksia may be summarised as follows:

Genus Banksia

Subgenus Isostylis
Subgenus Banksia

Section Oncostylis
Section Coccinea
Section Banksia

Series Grandes
Series Banksia
Series Crocinae
Series Prostratae
Series Cyrtostylis
Series Tetragonae
Series Bauerinae
Series Quercinae
Series Salicinae

B. dentata - B. aquilonia - B. integrifolia - B. plagiocarpa - B. oblongifolia - B. robur - B. conferta - B. paludosa - B. marginata - B. canei - B. saxicola

== 21st century ==
Since 1998, Austin Mast has been publishing results of ongoing cladistic analyses of DNA sequence data for the subtribe Banksiinae, which comprises Banksia and Dryandra. His inferred phylogeny is very greatly different from George's arrangement, and provides compelling evidence for the paraphyly of Banksia with respect to Dryandra. Early in 2007, Mast and Thiele initiated a rearrangement of Banksia by transferring Dryandra into it, and publishing B. subg. Spathulatae for the species having spoon-shaped cotyledons. They foreshadowed publishing a full arrangement once DNA sampling of Dryandra was complete; in the meantime, if Mast and Thiele's nomenclatural changes are taken as an interim arrangement, then B. integrifolia is placed in B. subg. Spathulatae.

== Subspecies and hybrids ==
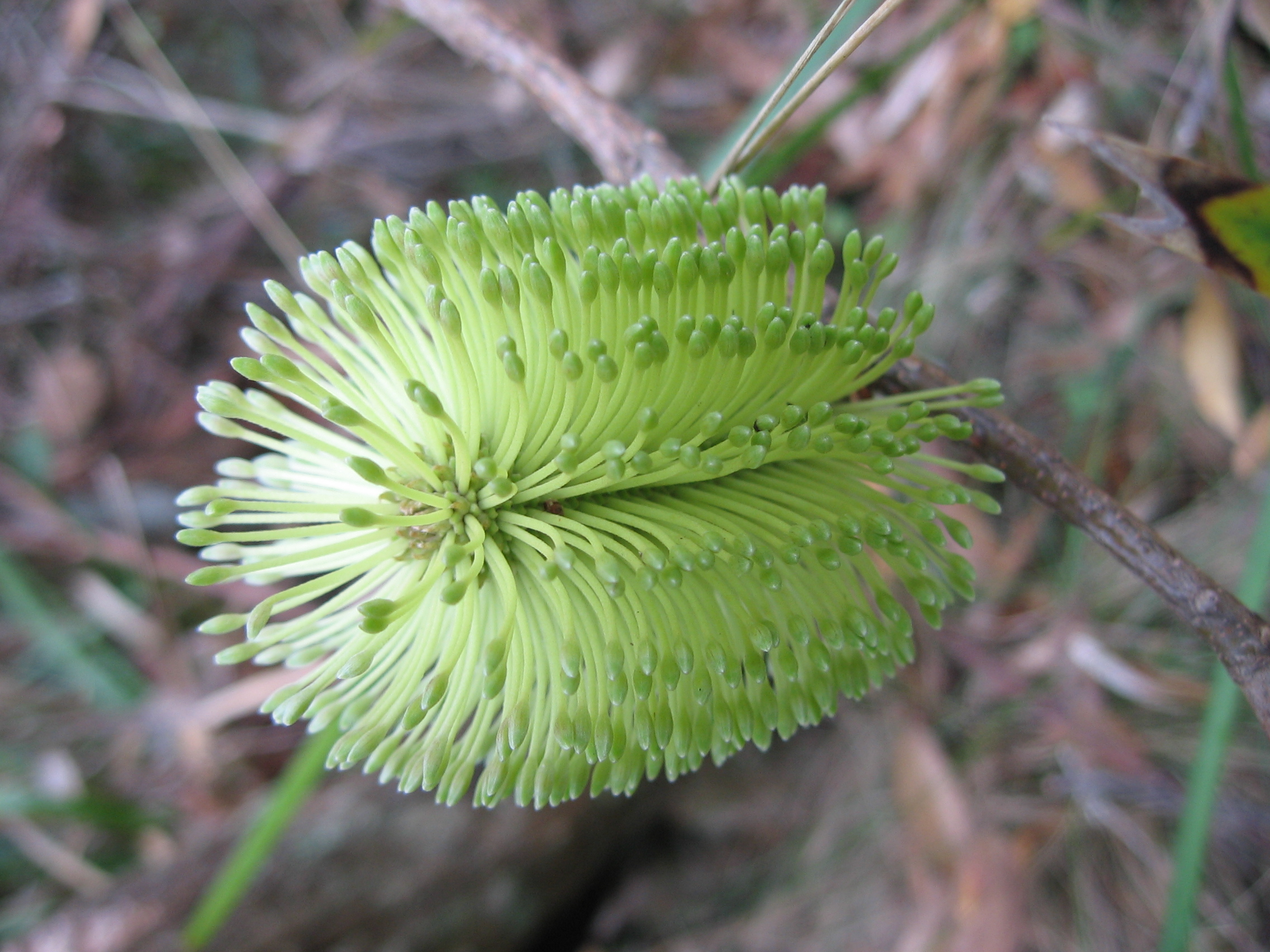
Inflorescence of B. i. subsp. monticola in late bud.

B. integrifolia is a highly variable species. Some of this variation can be attributed to environmental factors, but much appears to be genetic: George writes that it "gives the impression that it is actively speciating to fill the many ecological niches through its range". Three subspecies are currently recognised: B. i. subsp. integrifolia, B. i. subsp. compar, and B. i. subsp. monticola. More recent work by Evans has supported this classification, with monticola more closely allied with the nominate subspecies than with compar.

Hybrids have been reported between B. integrifolia and other members of series Salicinae, specifically B. paludosa and B. marginata, but no hybrid names have been formally published to date.
