= B. spicata =

B. spicata may refer to:

- Banksia spicata, a synonym for Banksia integrifolia subsp. integrifolia, a flowering plant species
- Byrsonima spicata, the Maricao tree, a plant species in the genus Byrsonima

== See also ==
- The dictionary definition of Spicata at Wiktionary
