= Banksia 'Roller Coaster' =

Cultivar of Banksia integrifolia

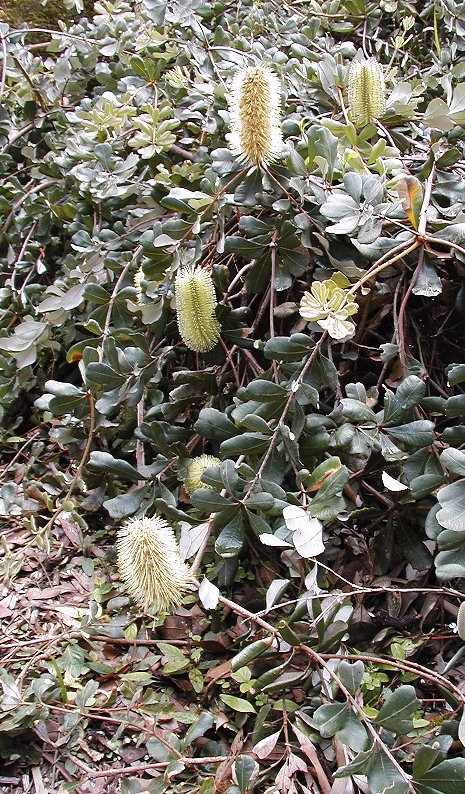
- B. 'Roller Coaster', Sylvan Grove Gardens, Picnic Point, New South Wales
- Species: Banksia integrifolia
- Cultivar: 'Roller Coaster'
- Origin: Austraflora Nurseries, Victoria, 1973

Banksia 'Roller Coaster', sometimes referred to as Banksia 'Austraflora Roller Coaster', is a registered Banksia cultivar bred from Banksia integrifolia subsp. integrifolia. Its extended cultivar name is Banksia integrifolia 'Roller Coaster'. It was bred, propagated and promoted by horticulturist Bill Molyneux of Austraflora nursery in Victoria, Australia. Chosen and bred for its vigorous prostrate habit, this has become a popular plant in both private and public gardens in eastern Australia, particularly Sydney and Melbourne.
