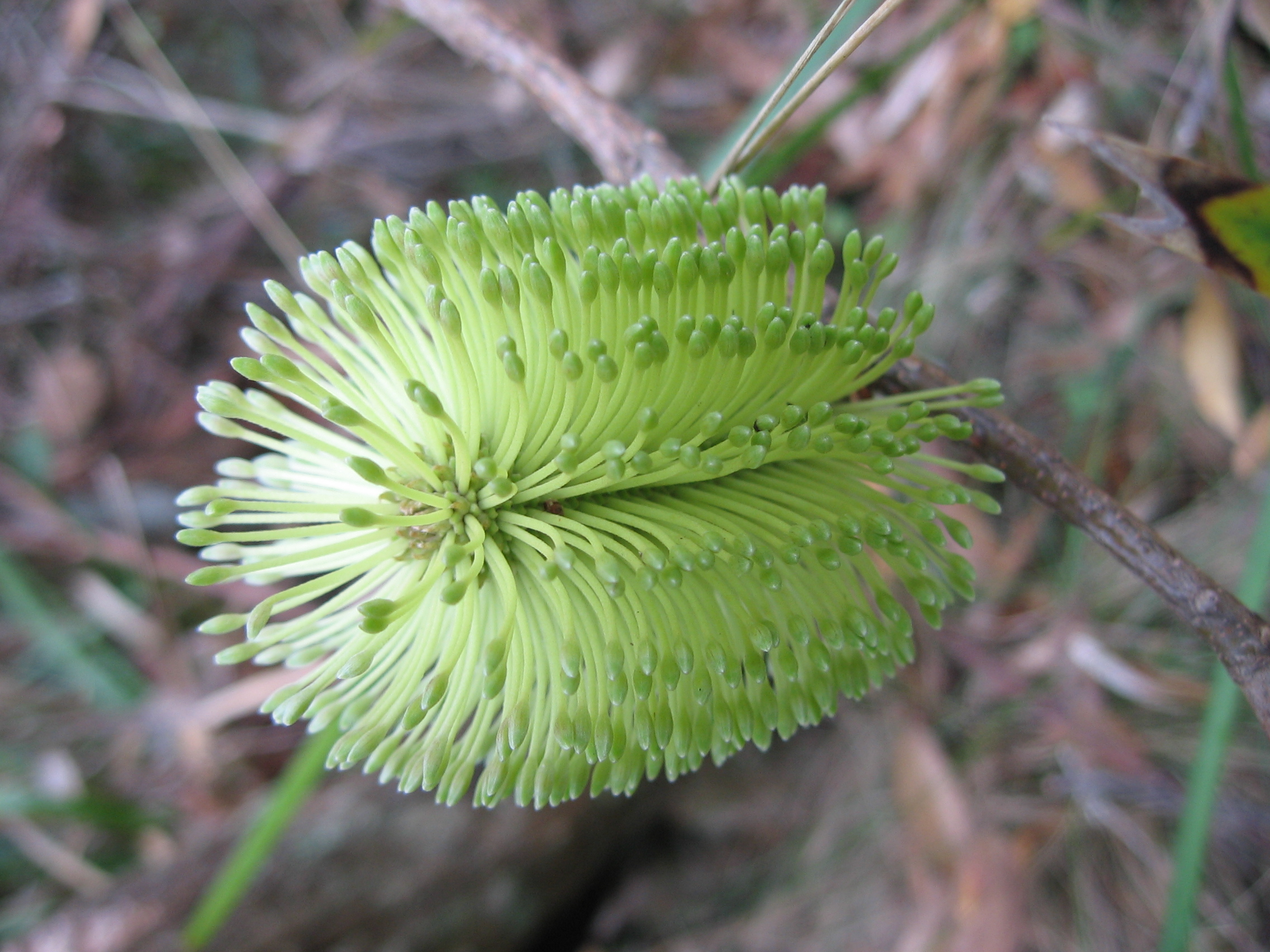
- Inflorescence of Banksia integrifolia subsp. monticola in late bud

Scientific classification
- Kingdom: Plantae
- Clade: Tracheophytes
- Clade: Angiosperms
- Clade: Eudicots
- Order: Proteales
- Family: Proteaceae
- Genus: Banksia
- Species: B. integrifolia
- Subspecies: B. i. subsp. monticola

Trinomial name
- Banksia integrifolia subsp. monticola K.R.Thiele

= Banksia integrifolia subsp. monticola =

White mountain banksia

Subspecies of tree found in Australia

Banksia integrifolia subsp. monticola, commonly known as white mountain banksia, is a subspecies of Banksia integrifolia. Described in 1994, it occurs in the Blue Mountains and in northern New South Wales. It contains the largest recorded Banksia trees.

== Description ==
B. integrifolia subsp. monticola is similar to B. integrifolia subsp. integrifolia, but differs in having longer, narrower leaves, and follicles that are more deeply embedded in the old flower spike. Follicles are less likely to open spontaneously. Inflorescences are similar to those of subspecies integrifolia, but may be pink-tinged in some localities, notably in Barrington Tops National Park. This subspecies contains the largest recorded Banksia specimens, with trees in Washpool National Park growing to 35 metres (110 feet) high. It is the most frost-tolerant banksia tree of all.

== Taxonomy ==
For many years this subspecies was considered a mountain form of B. integrifolia subsp. compar, although it is now known to be closer to B. integrifolia subsp. integrifolia both phenetically and genetically. It was identified as a separate subspecies in Gwen Harden's 1991 publication Flora of New South Wales, but Harden did not publish a name for it, instead referring to it as "Banksia integrifolia subsp. A". In 1994, Kevin Thiele confirmed its status as a subspecies, and published it as Banksia integrifolia subsp. monticola K.R.Thiele. The subspecies epithet monticola refers to its montane distribution, and is a Latin word meaning "dweller in the mountains".

== Distribution and habitat ==
Unlike the other B. integrifolia subspecies, B. integrifolia subsp. monticola occurs well inland, in the Blue Mountains between Mount Wilson and the New England National Park. It grows in fertile soils derived from igneous rock at altitudes above 650 metres (2,130 ft), whereas the other subspecies occur only at altitudes below 500 metres, and are generally associated with infertile soils derived from sedimentary rock.

== Cultivation and uses ==
It is valued because of its frost hardiness. It has been planted in England.

== Gallery ==
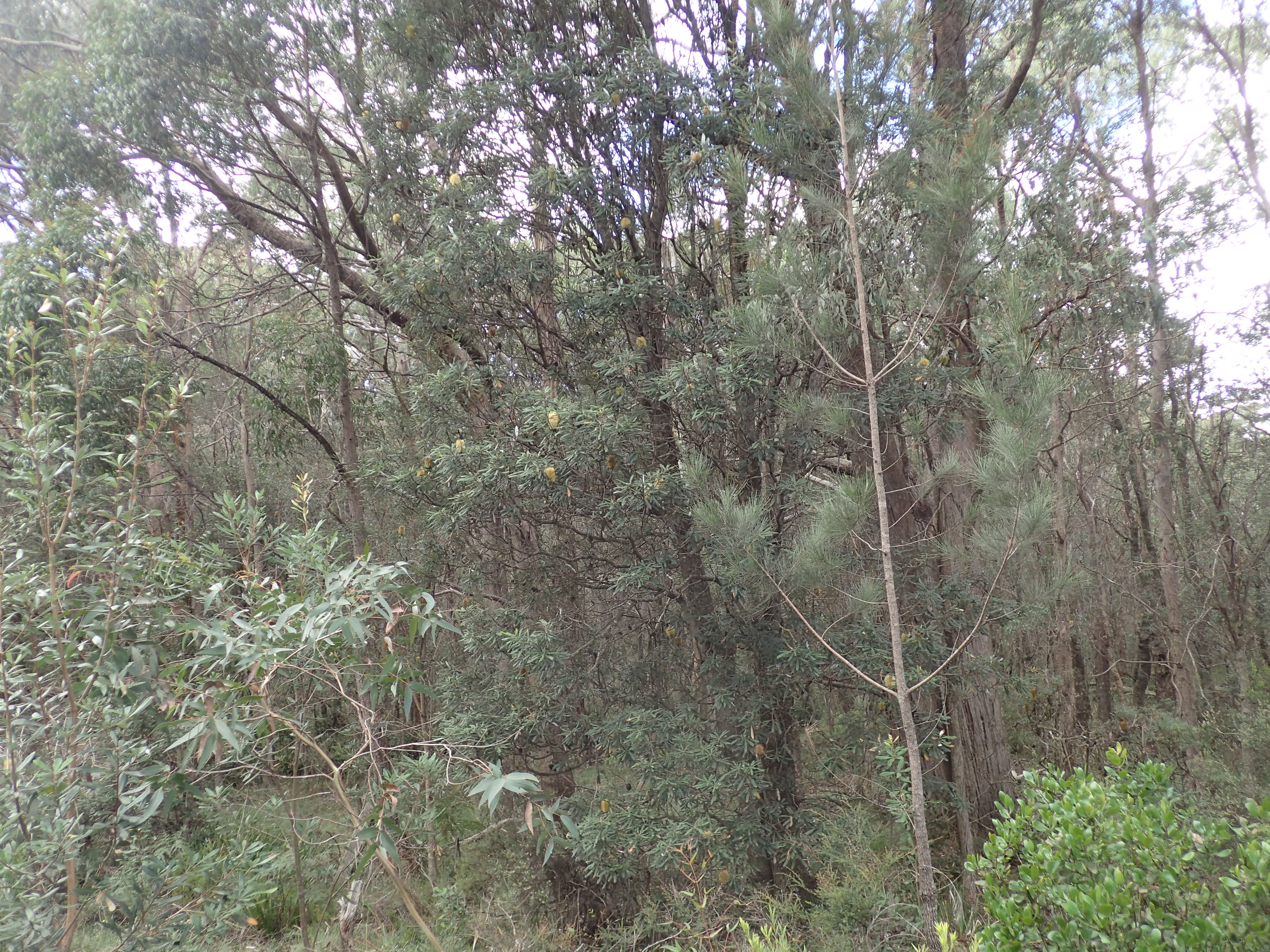
Banksia integrifolia subsp. monticola habitat on Waterfall Way near the New England National Park turnoff

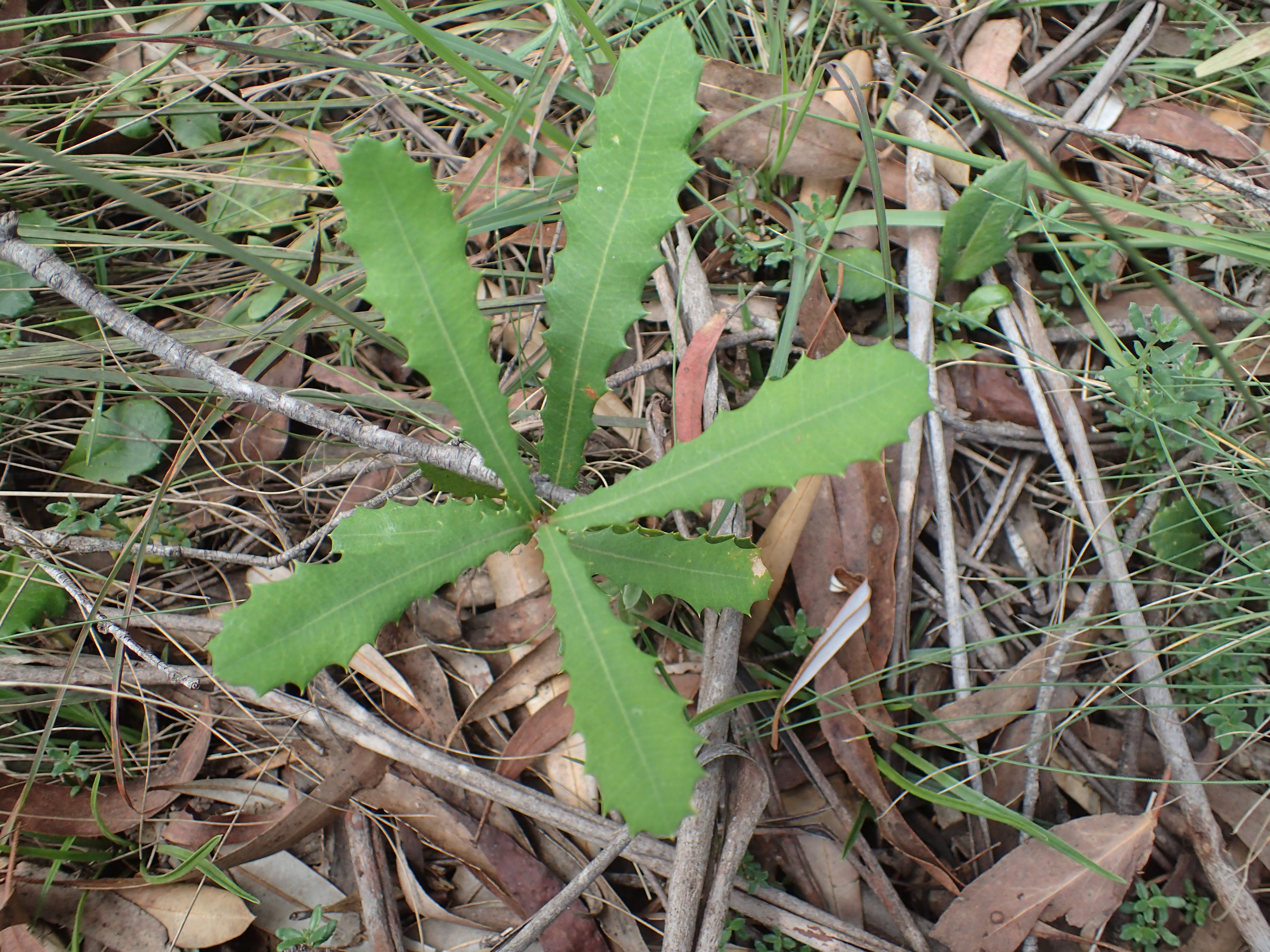
Leaves on young plant

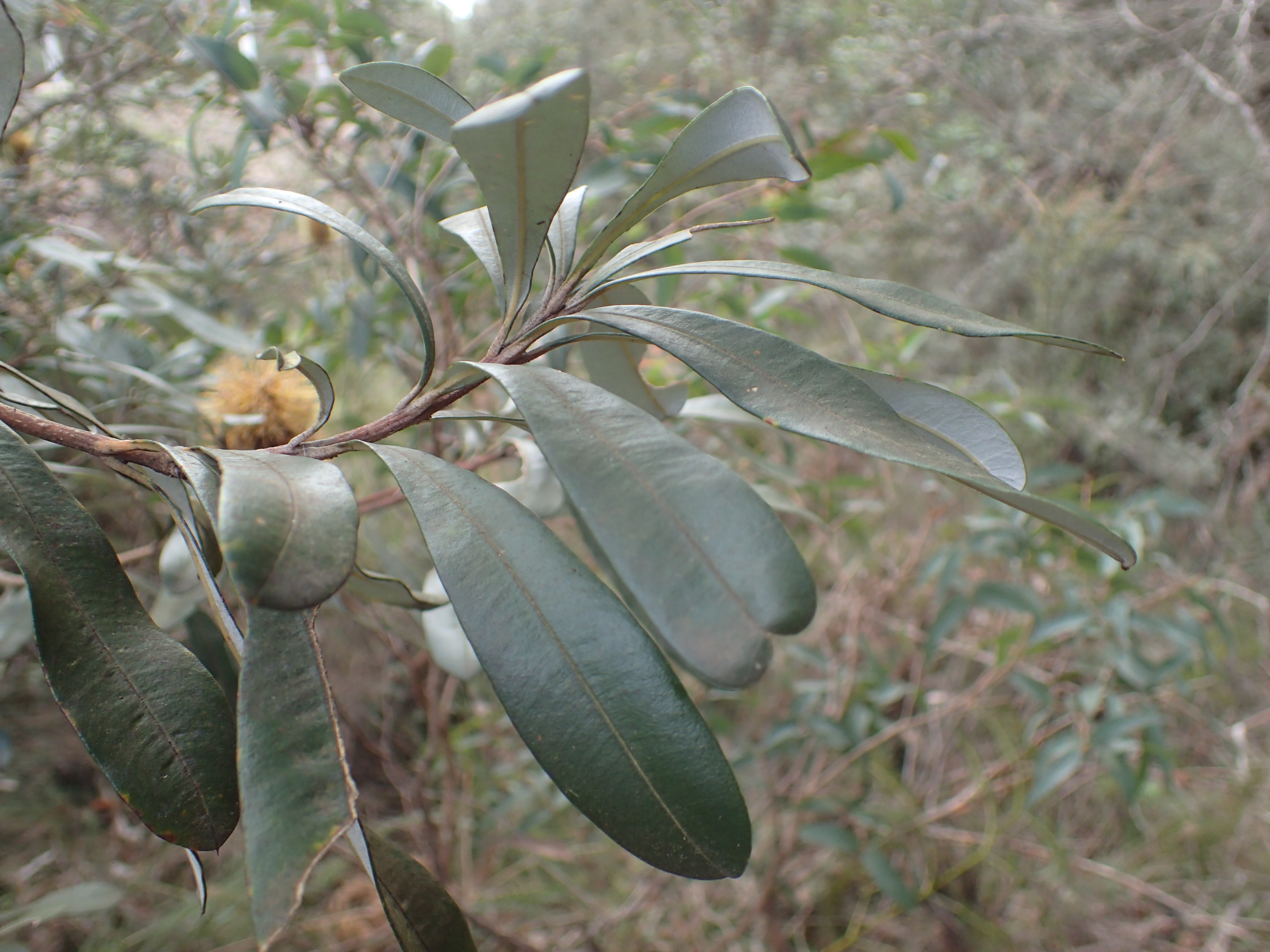
Mature leaves

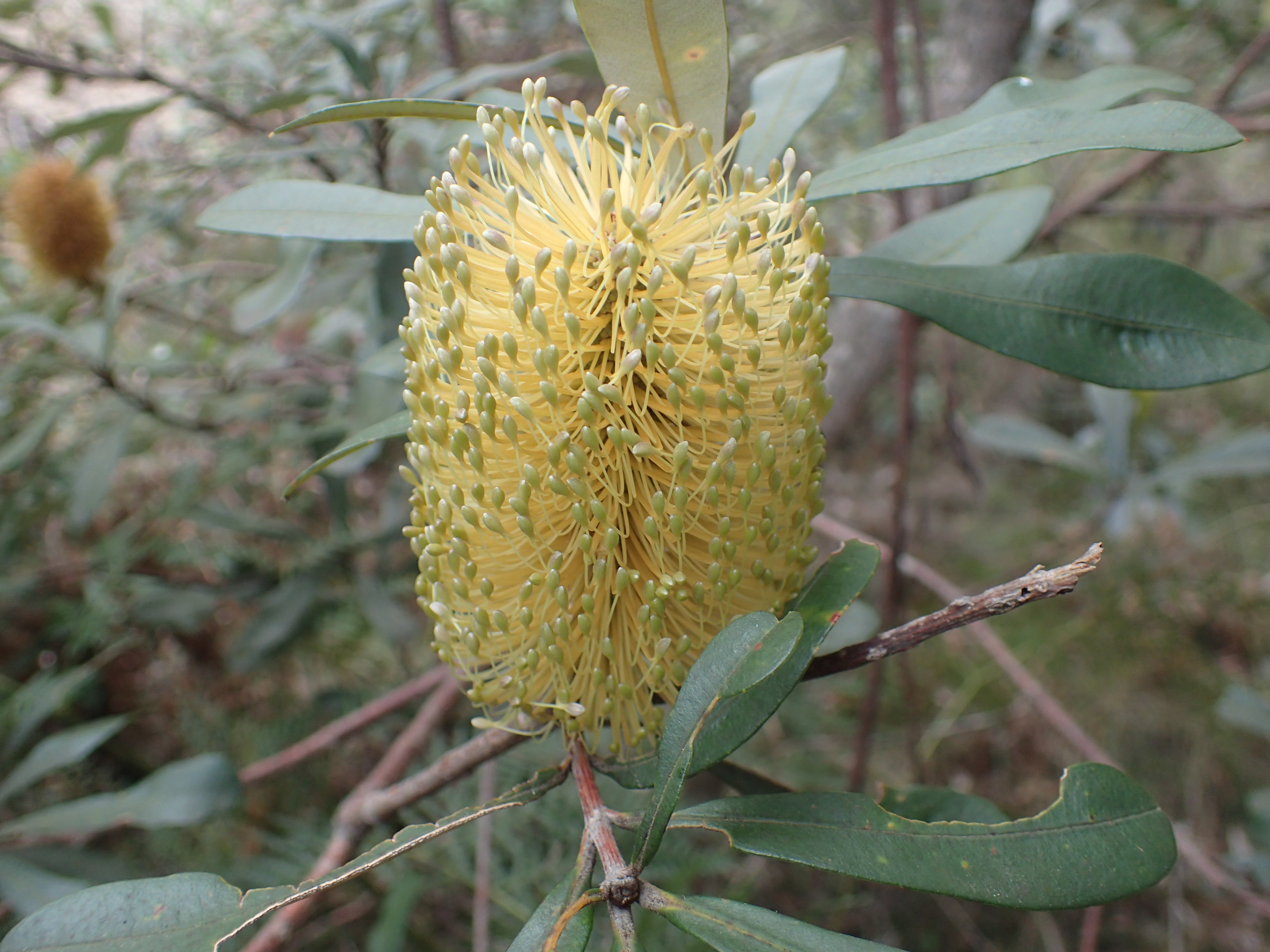
Flower spike before anthesis

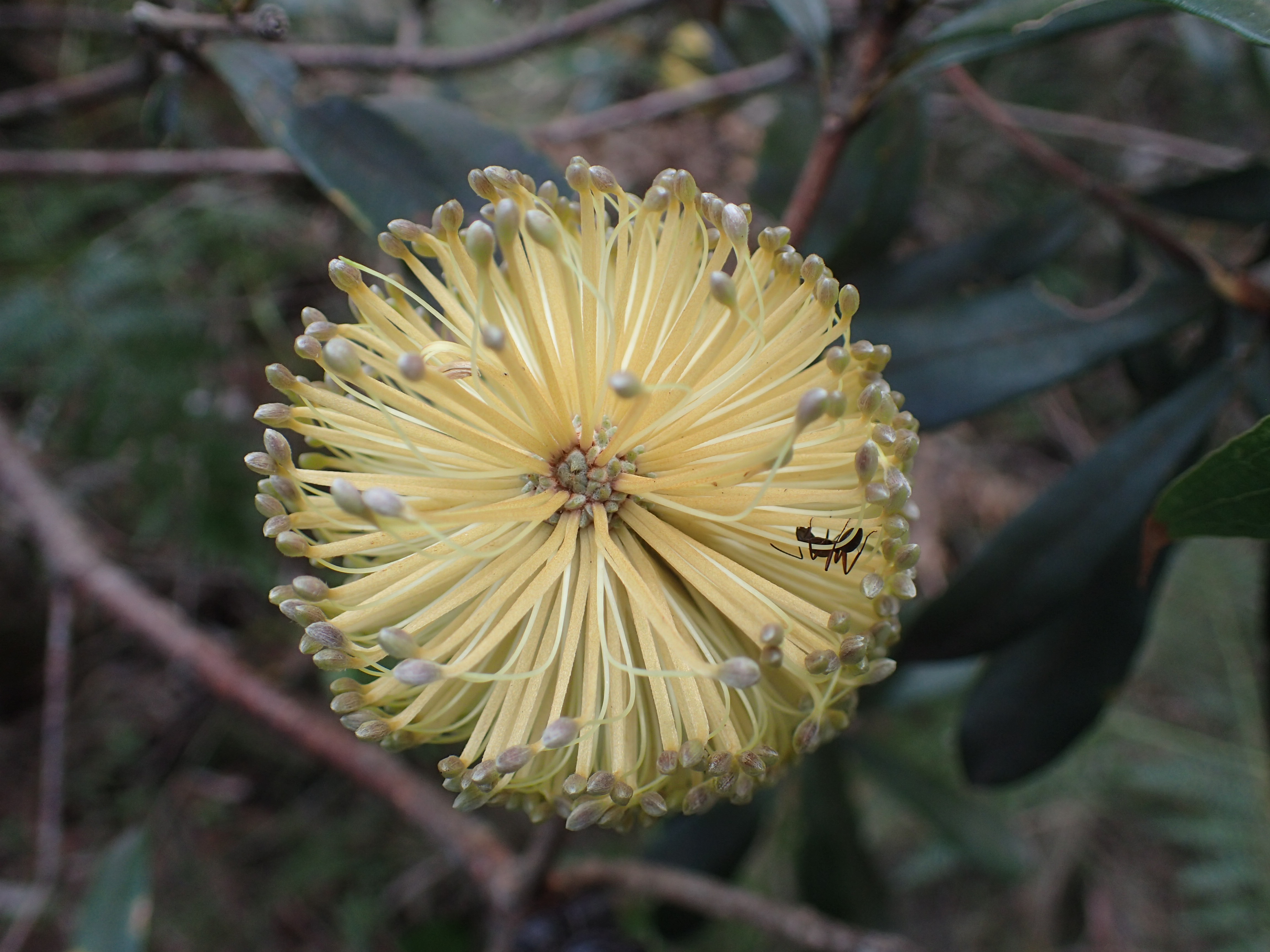
Top end of flower spike

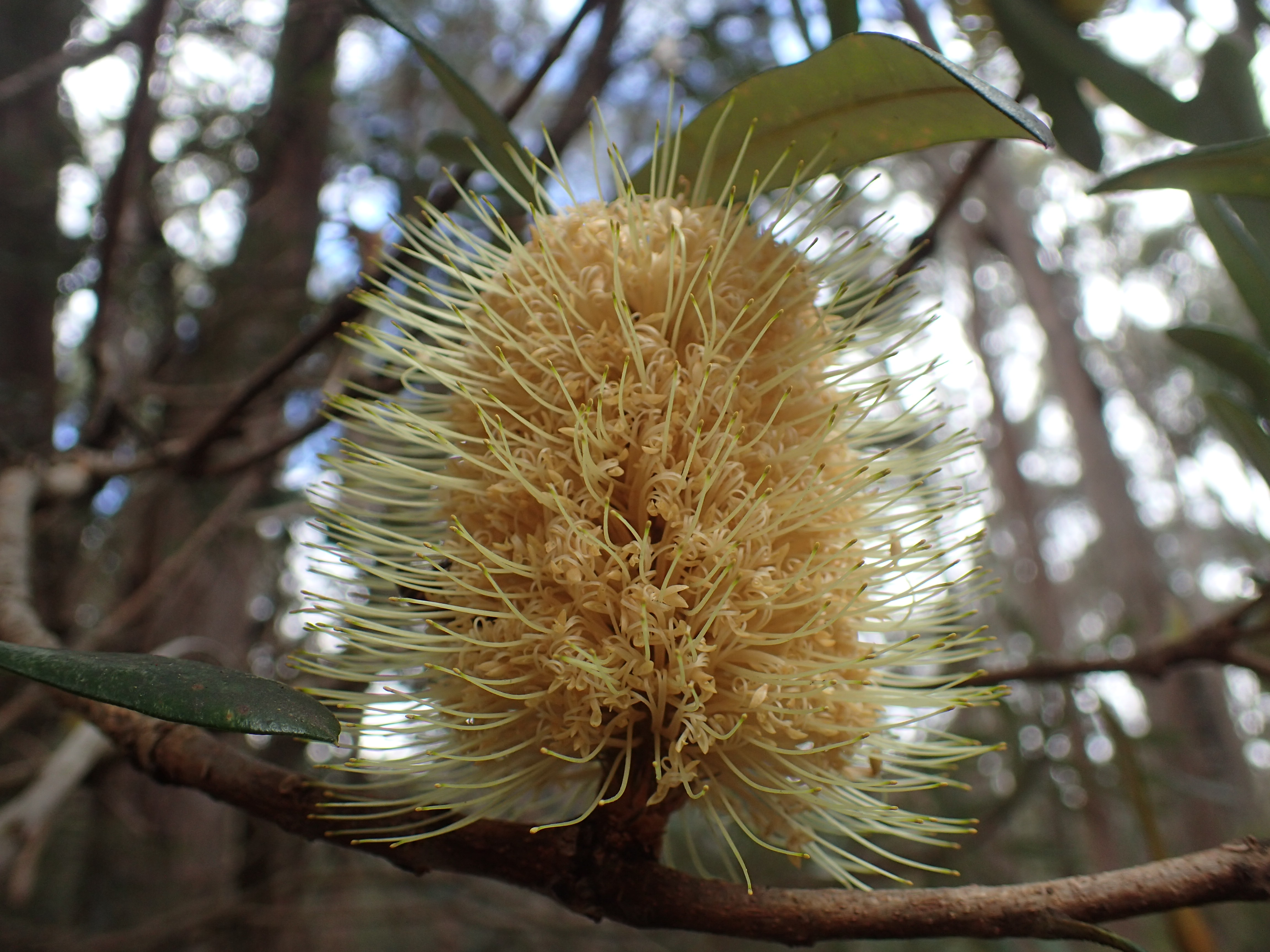
Flowers after anthesis
