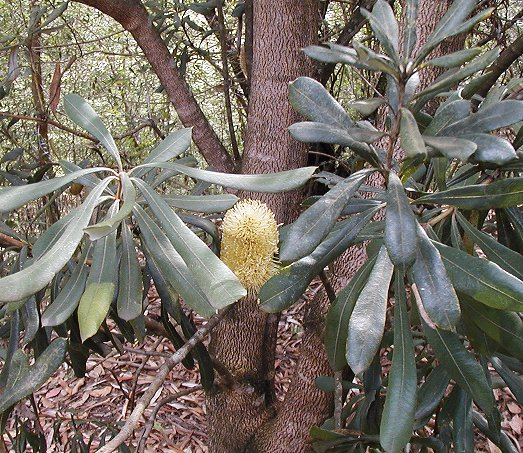

Scientific classification
- Kingdom: Plantae
- Clade: Tracheophytes
- Clade: Angiosperms
- Clade: Eudicots
- Order: Proteales
- Family: Proteaceae
- Genus: Banksia
- Species: B. integrifolia
- Subspecies: B. i. subsp. compar

Trinomial name
- Banksia integrifolia subsp. compar (R.Br.) K.R.Thiele

= Banksia integrifolia subsp. compar =

Subspecies of plant from eastern Australia

Banksia integrifolia subsp. compar is a subspecies of Banksia integrifolia. It has larger, glossier leaves than other subspecies, and occurs much further north.

== Description ==
B. integrifolia subsp. compar is similar to B. integrifolia subsp. integrifolia, but has larger, glossier leaves with undulate margins.

== Taxonomy ==
The type specimen for Banksia integrifolia subsp. compar was collected just south of Keppel Bay, Queensland, Australia by Robert Brown in August 1802. Brown published the specimen as a new species in his 1810 On the Proteaceae of Jussieu, but acknowledged its similarity to B. integrifolia in his choice of name: Banksia compar R.Br, from the Latin compar, meaning "similar".

In 1870, George Bentham declared it a synonym of B. integrifolia., but this arrangement lasted only until 1913, when Frederick Bailey declared the taxon to be a distinct variety of B. integrifolia in his Comprehensive Catalogue of Queensland Plants. In 1994, it was promoted to subspecies rank by Kevin Thiele; its full name is therefore "Banksia integrifolia subsp. compar (R.Br.) K.R.Thiele".

For many years a montane form of the subspecies was recognised, with differences in leaf shape and fruiting structure, but it was not known whether these were real morphological variations, or simply adaptations to the colder weather at high altitudes. In 1994, at the same time that the taxon was promoted from variety to subspecies rank, the montane form was declared a separate subspecies, Banksia integrifolia subsp. monticola.

== Distribution and habitat ==
Banksia integrifolia subsp. compar is generally found on infertile, sandy soils within 50 kilometres (30 mi) of the coast. Endemic to Australia, it occurs along the east coast of Queensland from Brisbane in the south, north to Proserpine. The Banksia Atlas also recorded "a possible outlier near Bishops Peak, Cardwell" which, if correct, would extend the subspecies' range by about 400 kilometres (250 mi).
