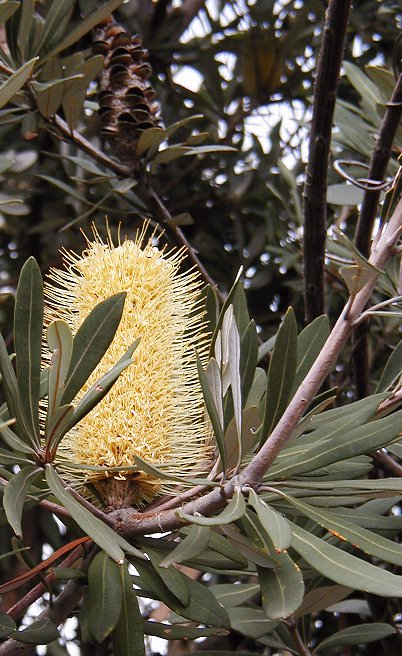
- Subsp. integrifolia

Conservation status
- Least Concern (IUCN 3.1)

Scientific classification
- Kingdom: Plantae
- Clade: Tracheophytes
- Clade: Angiosperms
- Clade: Eudicots
- Order: Proteales
- Family: Proteaceae
- Genus: Banksia
- Subgenus: Banksia subg. Banksia
- Species: B. integrifolia

Binomial name
- Banksia integrifolia L.f.

Subspecies
- B. integrifolia subsp. integrifolia; B. integrifolia subsp. compar; B. integrifolia subsp. monticola
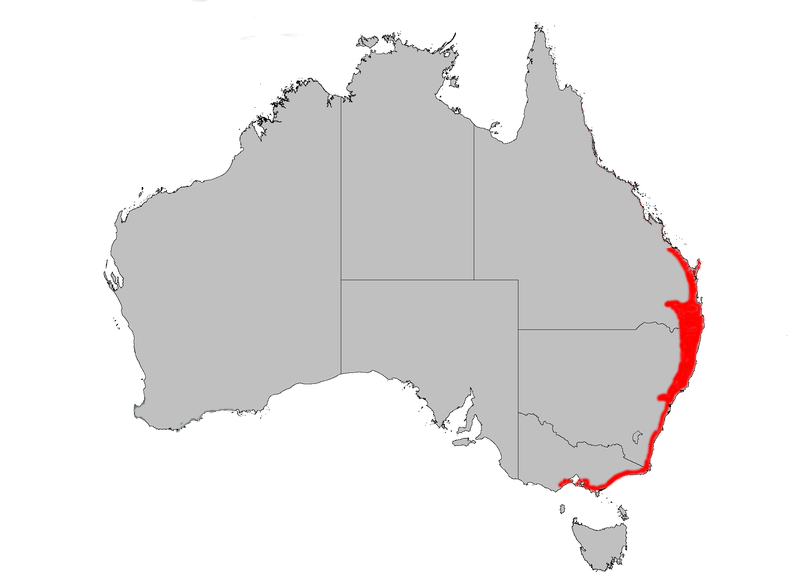
- B. integrifolia distribution

Synonyms
- Banksia integrifolia var. typica Domin

= Banksia integrifolia =

Coast banksia

Species of tree native to Australia

Banksia integrifolia, commonly known as the coast banksia, is a species of tree that grows along the east coast of Australia. One of the most widely distributed Banksia species, it occurs between Victoria and Central Queensland in a broad range of habitats, from coastal dunes to mountains. It is highly variable in form, but is most often encountered as a tree up to 25 metres (82 ft) in height. Its leaves have dark green upper surfaces and white undersides, a contrast that can be striking on windy days.

It is one of the four original Banksia species collected by Sir Joseph Banks in 1770, and one of four species published in 1782 as part of Carolus Linnaeus the Younger's original description of the genus. It has had a complicated taxonomic history, with numerous species and varieties ascribed to it, only to be rejected or promoted to separate species. Modern taxonomy recognises three subspecies: B. integrifolia subsp. integrifolia, B. integrifolia subsp. compar and B. integrifolia subsp. monticola.

A hardy and versatile garden plant, B. integrifolia is widely planted in Australian gardens. It is a popular choice for parks and streetscapes, and has been used for bush revegetation and stabilisation of dunes. Its hardiness has prompted research into its suitability for use as a rootstock in the cut flower trade, but has also caused concerns about its potential to become a weed outside its natural habitat.

== Names ==
Now widely known as the coast banksia or coastal banksia, B. integrifolia was previously known by a range of common names. The Checklist of Australian Trees lists four other common names: honeysuckle, white banksia, white bottlebrush and white honeysuckle; and some older sources refer to it as honeysuckle oak.

It was known to Indigenous Australians before its discovery and naming by Europeans; for example, the Gunai people of Gippsland called it birrna. Because of its wide range it would have a name in a number of other indigenous languages, but these are now lost. In 2001, a search of historical archives for recorded indigenous names of Victorian flora and fauna failed to find a single name for the species.

== Description ==
B. integrifolia is a highly variable species. It is most often encountered as a tree up to 25 metres (82 ft) in height, but in sheltered locations it can reach 35 metres (115 ft). In more exposed areas it may grow as a small, gnarled tree, reaching to no more than about 5 metres (16 ft), and in highly exposed positions, such as on exposed coastal headlands, it may even be reduced to a small shrub.

The tree usually has a single stout trunk, which is often twisted and gnarled, with the rough grey bark characteristic of Banksia. The leaves are dark green with a white underside, and occur in whorls of three to five. Adult leaves have entire margins. George specifies their dimensions as 4–20 cm (1.6–7.9 in) long and 6–35 mm (0.24–1.38 in) wide, but The Banksia Atlas warns that "Atlas contributors found great variability in these measurements with specimens often falling outside the varietal limits specified by George (1981) or being intermediate between two varieties." Juvenile leaves have dentate margins with a few short teeth, and are generally larger than adult leaves.

Flowers occur in Banksia's characteristic "flower spike", an inflorescence made up of several hundred flowers densely packed in a spiral around a woody axis. This is roughly cylindrical, 10–12 cm (3.9–4.7 in) high and 5 cm (2.0 in) wide. Flowers are usually pale yellow to yellow, but may be greenish or pinkish in bud. Each individual flower consists of a tubular perianth made up of four united tepals, and one long wiry style. Characteristic of the taxonomic section in which it is placed, the styles are straight rather than hooked. The style ends are initially trapped inside the upper perianth parts, but break free at anthesis. This process starts with the flowers at the bottom of the inflorescence, sweeping up the spike at an unusually high rate of between 96 and 390 flowers per 24 hours.

The flower spikes are not as prominent as in some other Banksia species, as they arise from two- to three-year-old nodes nested within the foliage. After flowering, old flower parts wither and fall away over a period of several months, revealing the "cone", a woody axis embedded with many small follicles. The follicles are initially greenish and downy, but gradually fade to dark grey. Each follicle contains one or sometimes two seeds, separated by a thin wooden separator. The seed itself is black, 6–10 mm (0.24–0.39 in) long with a feathery black 'wing' 10–20 mm (0.4–0.8 in) long.

== Taxonomy ==
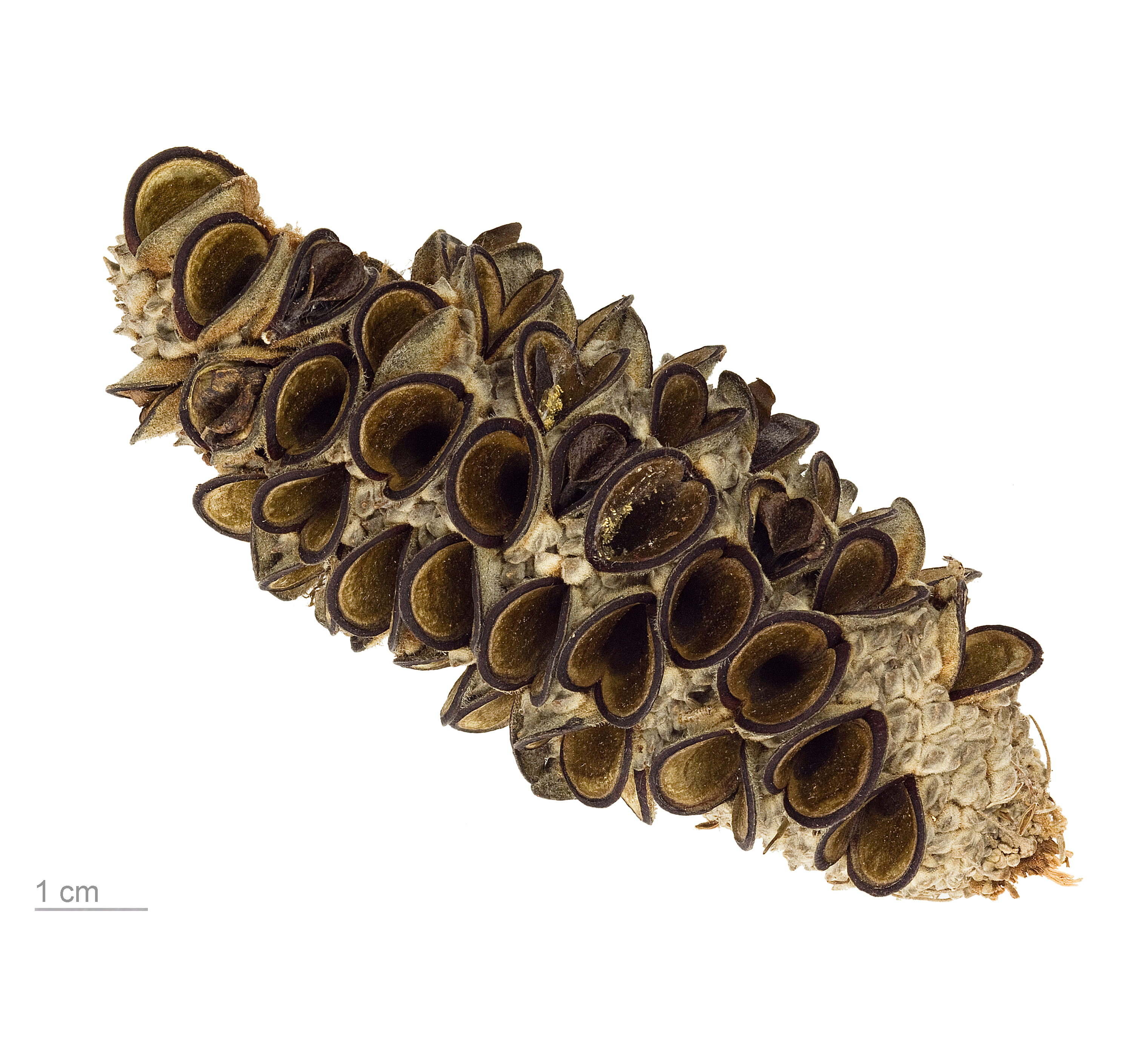
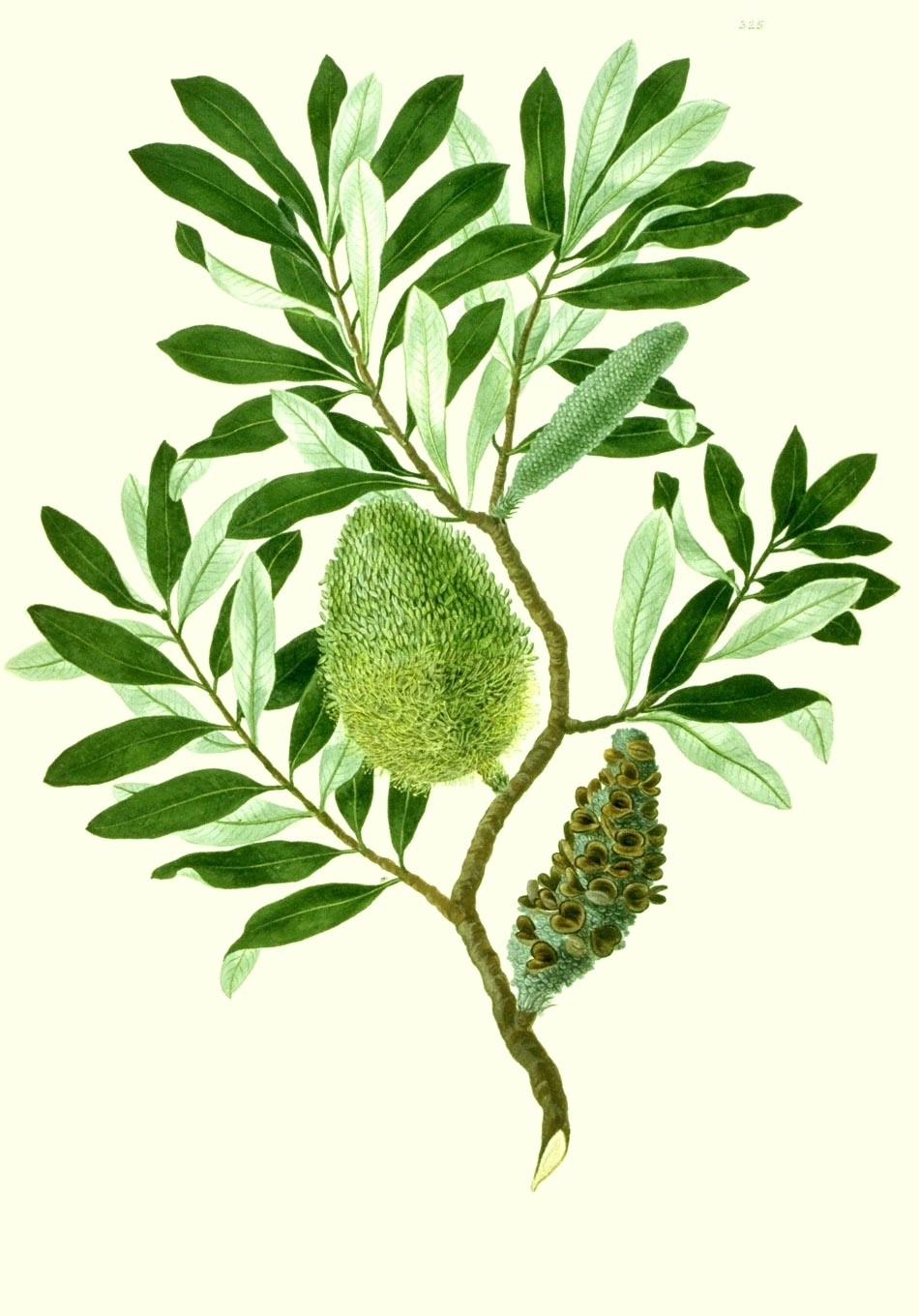
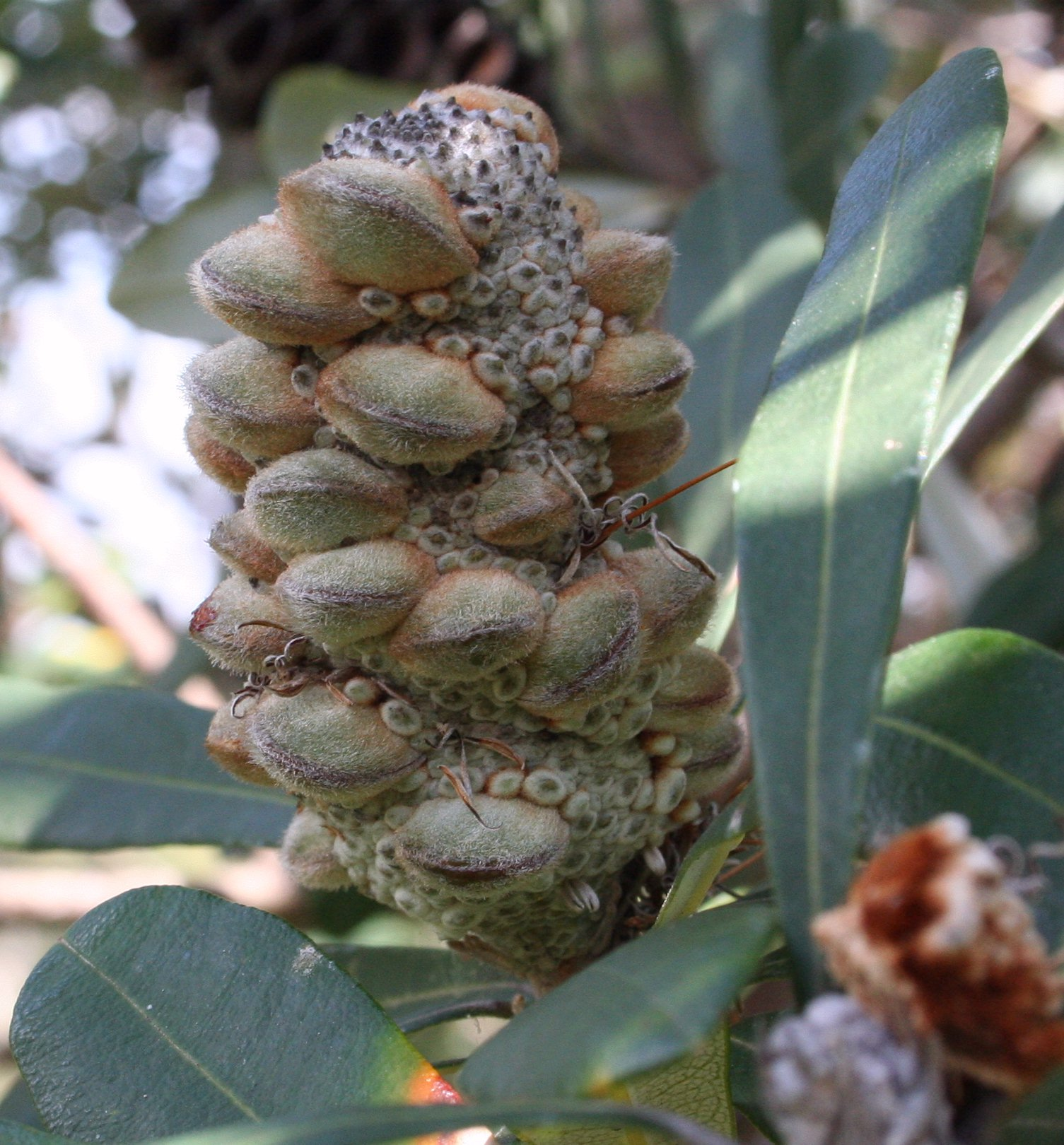
Top: Banksia integrifolia – MHNT. Bottom left: B. integrifolia by Sydney Parkinson, from Banks' Florilegium. Right: Infructescence and leaves of B. integrifolia subsp. integrifolia.

B. integrifolia was first collected at Botany Bay on 29 April 1770, by Sir Joseph Banks and Dr Daniel Solander, naturalists on the Endeavour during Lieutenant (later Captain) James Cook's first voyage to the Pacific Ocean. Solander coined the (unpublished) binomial name Leucadendrum integrifolium in Banks' Florilegium. However, the species was not published until April 1782, when Carolus Linnaeus the Younger described the first four Banksia species in his Supplementum Plantarum. Linnaeus distinguished the species by their leaf shapes, and named them accordingly. Thus the species with entire leaf margins was given the specific name integrifolia, from the Latin integer meaning 'entire' and folium 'leaf'. The full name for the species is therefore Banksia integrifolia L.f.

Then followed around 200 years of confusion over the taxonomic limits of the species, caused by the species' great variability, similarities with closely related species, and early attempts to classify the species based on dried specimen material alone. A stable Banksia taxonomy did not begin to emerge until 1981 with the publication of Alex George's landmark monograph The genus Banksia L.f. (Proteaceae). Over the next 18 years, George's arrangement was gradually refined in the light of new research and the discovery of new material, and there were several changes to B. integrifolia's infraspecific taxa. These changes culminated in George's 1999 arrangement, which had broad acceptance until 2005, when Austin Mast, Eric Jones and Shawn Havery published a phylogeny that did not accord with George's arrangement. A new taxonomic arrangement was not published at the time, but early in 2007 Mast and Thiele initiated a rearrangement by transferring Dryandra to Banksia, and publishing B. subg. Spathulatae for the species having spoon-shaped cotyledons. They foreshadowed publishing a full arrangement once DNA sampling of Dryandra was complete. In the meantime, if Mast and Thiele's nomenclatural changes are taken as an interim arrangement, then B. integrifolia is placed in B. subg. Spathulatae; it is the type species for the subgenus.

=== Placement within Banksia ===
The current taxonomic arrangement of the genus Banksia is based on George's 1999 monograph for the Flora of Australia book series. In this arrangement, B. integrifolia is placed in Banksia subg. Banksia, because its inflorescences take the form of Banksia's characteristic flower spikes; Banksia sect. Banksia because of its straight styles; and Banksia ser. Salicinae because its inflorescences are cylindrical. Kevin Thiele additionally placed it in a subseries Integrifoliae, but this was not supported by George.

B. integrifolia's placement within Banksia may be summarised as follows:

- Genus Banksia
  - Subgenus Isostylis
  - Subgenus Banksia
    - Section Oncostylis
    - Section Coccinea
    - Section Banksia
      - Series Grandes
      - Series Banksia
      - Series Crocinae
      - Series Prostratae
      - Series Cyrtostylis
      - Series Tetragonae
      - Series Bauerinae
      - Series Quercinae
      - Series Salicinae
        - B. dentata – B. aquilonia – B. integrifolia – B. plagiocarpa – B. oblongifolia – B. robur – B. conferta – B. paludosa – B. marginata – B. canei – B. saxicola

=== Subspecies ===
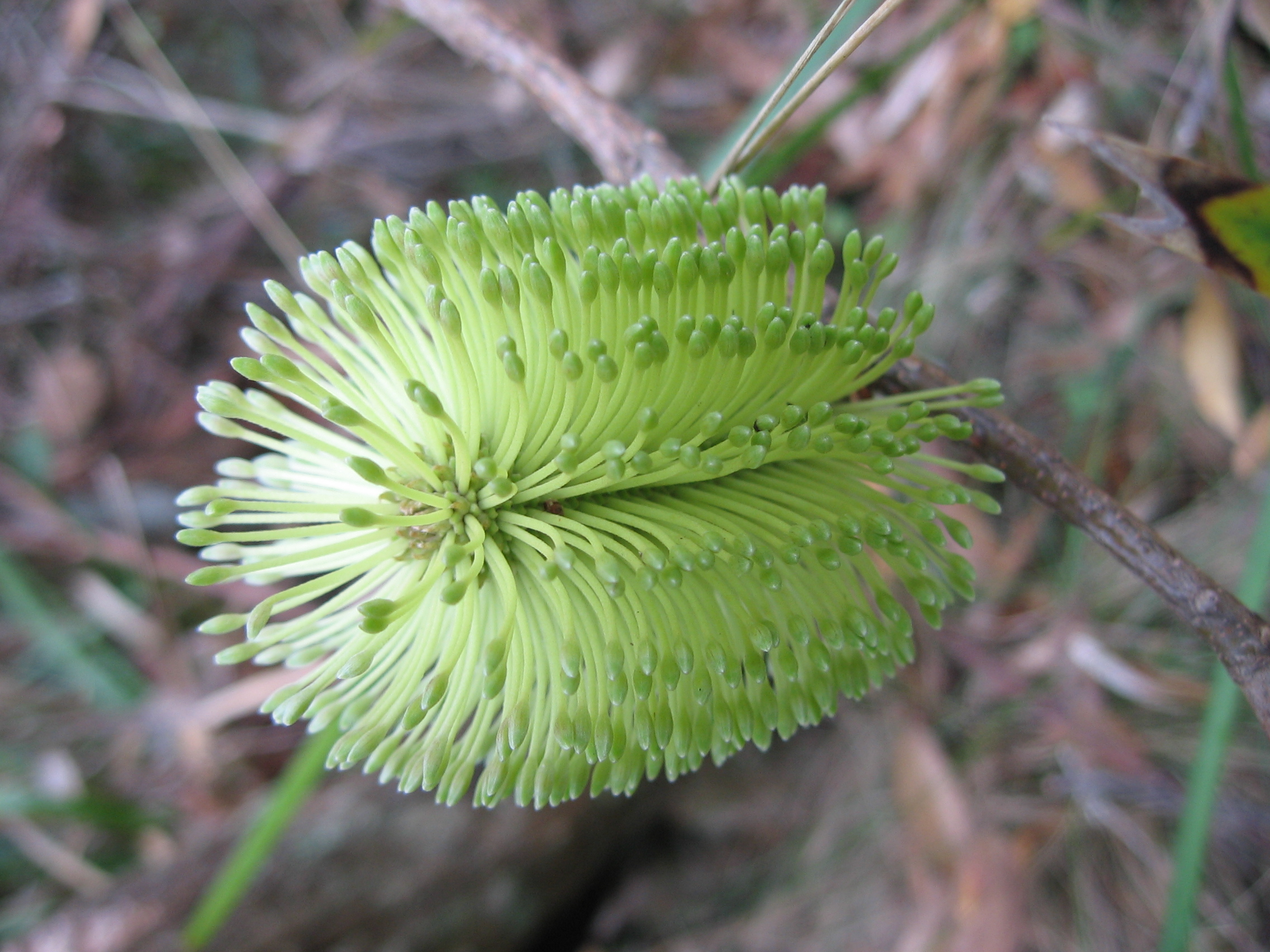
Inflorescence of B. integrifolia subsp. monticola in late bud

The names of three subspecies are accepted at the Australian Plant Census as at May 2020:

- B. integrifolia subsp. compar (R.Br.) K.R.Thiele;
- B. integrifolia R.Br.subsp. integrifolia;
- B. integrifolia subsp. monticola K.R.Thiele.

Although some of the great variability of B. integrifolia can be attributed to environmental factors, much is genetic: George writes that it "gives the impression that it is actively speciating to fill the many ecological niches through its range". Genetic variation across its range has been mapped in some detail with microsatellite markers, facilitating further analysis of intraspecific relationships. Fractal analysis of the shape and spectrum (colour) of the leaves has been used to determine to which subspecies plants of unknown provenance belong.

Banksia integrifolia subsp. integrifolia
The nominate subspecies occurs near the coast over most of the species' range except the far north. It varies little except in northern New South Wales and southern Queensland, where some populations appear to be intermediate with B. integrifolia subsp. compar.
Banksia integrifolia subsp. compar
This subspecies grows in coastal Queensland as far north as Proserpine. For most of its range it is the only subspecies, but near its southern limit it co-occurs with B. integrifolia subsp. integrifolia. The two subspecies are distinguishable by their leaves, which are larger and glossy with wavy margins on B. integrifolia subsp. compar.
Banksia integrifolia subsp. monticola
Commonly known as white mountain banksia, it is the only subspecies with a montane distribution; it occurs in the Blue Mountains of New South Wales. It is similar in form to B. integrifolia subsp. integrifolia, but differs in having longer, narrower leaves, and follicles that are more deeply embedded in the old flower spike.

=== Hybrids ===
Presumed natural hybrids have been reported between B. integrifolia and other members of Banksia ser. Salicinae, although no hybrid names have been formally published to date. Presumed hybrids are identified by their intermediate features; for example those with B. paludosa (swamp banksia), known from Jervis Bay and Green Cape on the coast of southern New South Wales, have a smaller habit, longer, thinner flower spikes, and persistent old flowers on old "cones", which are otherwise bare on pure B. integrifolia.

Presumed hybrids with B. marginata (silver banksia) occur on Wilsons Promontory in Victoria; these are found in localities where both species co-occur, and have features intermediate between the two. Another purported hybrid with B. marginata, thought to be from Cape Paterson on Victoria's south coast, was first described by Alf Salkin and is commercially available in small quantities. It forms an attractive hardy low-growing plant to 1 metre (3.3 ft).

== Distribution and habitat ==
B. integrifolia is widely distributed, in both geographical and ecological terms. According to Alex George, "it spans a wider geographical and climatic range than any other species." Thiele and Ladiges make a similar claim: that its distribution "is a broader latitudinal, altitudinal and ecological amplitude than any other species, with the possible exception of B. spinulosa." No other species of tree occurs closer to the coast at Cape Byron, making B. integrifolia the most easterly tree on the Australian mainland.

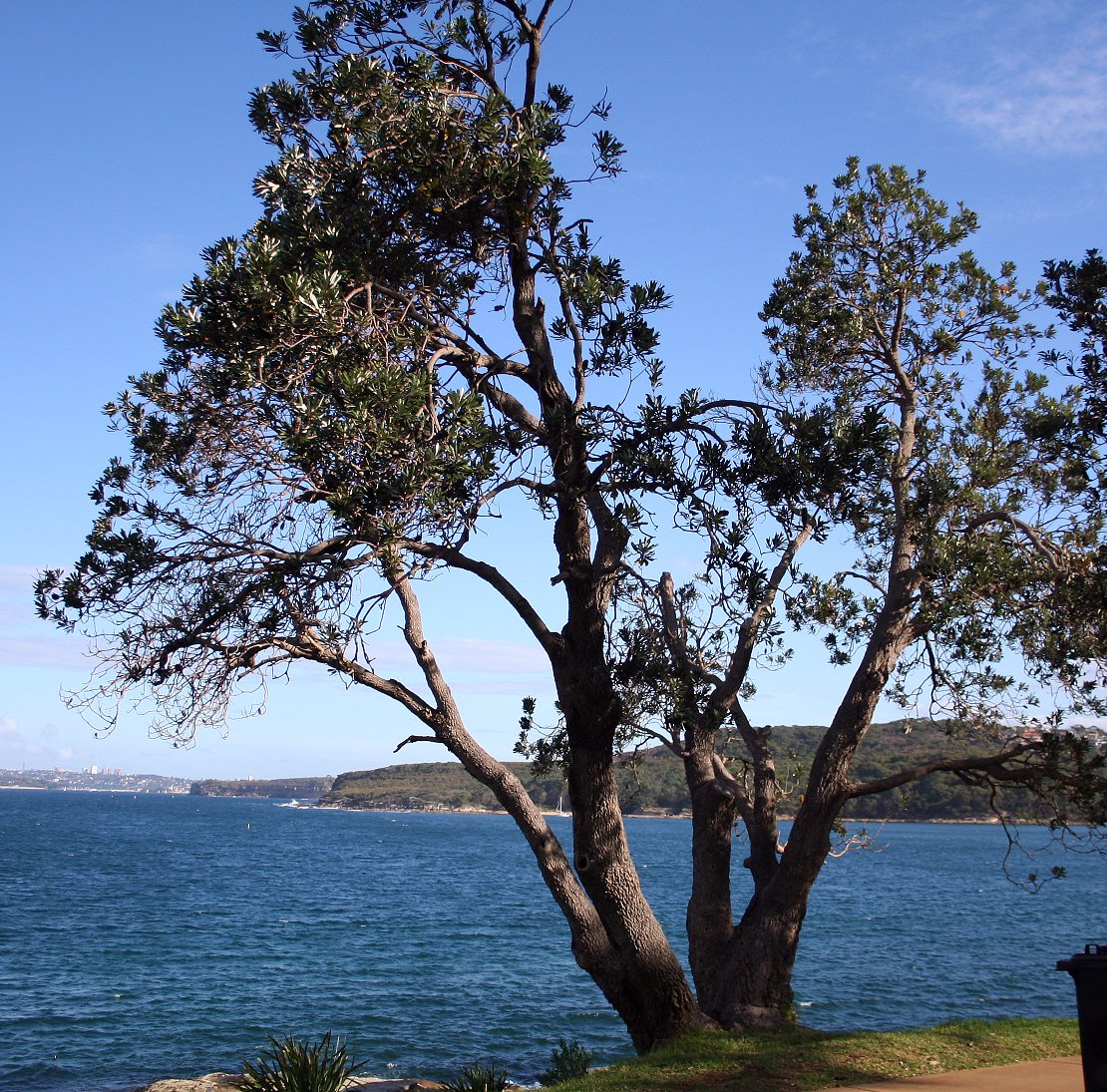
Tree on headland, Manly, NSW

It occurs along almost the entire eastern coast of Australia, from Geelong, Victoria to Proserpine, Queensland. There was an isolated population on Long Island, Tasmania in 1999, and an 1876 record allegedly from King Island, although there has been speculation that that specimen was actually collected in the Furneaux Group. The species no longer occurs at any of these Tasmania locations, and has been declared extinct in Tasmania under that state's Threatened Species Protection Act 1995. The range of latitude is thus about 20° to 38°S.

For most of its distribution, B. integrifolia occurs only within about 50 km (31 mi) of the coast, where it typically occurs on poor quality sandy soils derived from sandstone. It grows near coastal cliffs and headlands, alongside river estuaries, and even on stabilised sand dunes. The temperature range for this area is around 0–30 °C (32–86 °F), with almost no frosts. The species can occur in pure stands, but is usually associated with other species such as Melaleuca quinquenervia (broad-leaved paperbark), Angophora costata (smooth-barked apple), Corymbia gummifera (red bloodwood), Eucalyptus botryoides (bangalay), Monotoca elliptica (wedding bush) and Leptospermum laevigatum (coast tea tree).

Between Sydney and Brisbane, B. integrifolia is found up to 200 km (120 mi) inland, with B. integrifolia subsp. monticola occurring in the Blue Mountains at altitudes up to 1,500 m (4,900 ft). There it grows on better quality volcanic or rocky soils derived from granites and basalts, and would experience up to 100 frosts per year. In this montane habitat, it occurs in association with Eucalyptus species such as E. viminalis (manna gum) and E. pauciflora (snow gum), and also rainforest species such as Nothofagus moorei (Antarctic beech) and Orites excelsa (prickly ash).

== Ecology ==
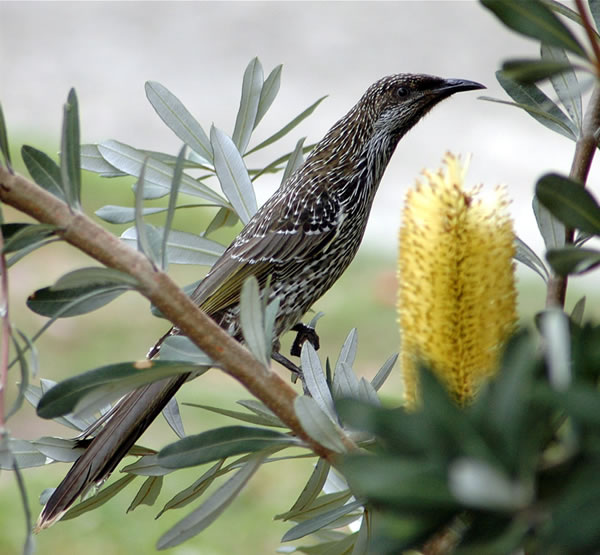
Anthochaera chrysoptera (little wattlebird) on B. integrifolia

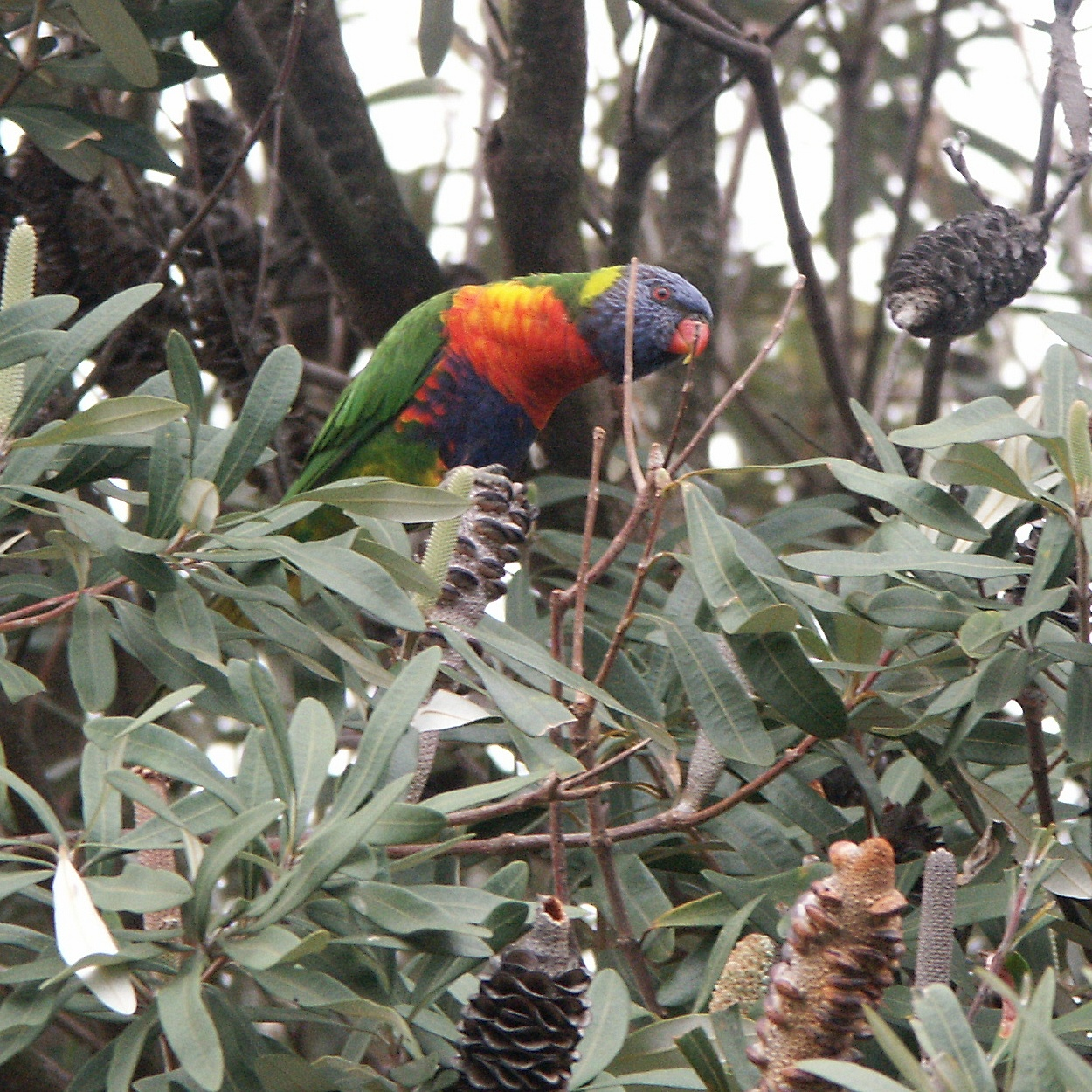
Trichoglossus moluccanus (rainbow lorikeet) on B. integrifolia

Like most other Proteaceae, B. integrifolia has proteoid roots, i.e., roots with dense clusters of short lateral rootlets that form a mat in the soil just below the leaf litter. These enhance solubilisation of nutrients, thus allowing nutrient uptake in low-nutrient soils such as the phosphorus-deficient native soils of Australia. Studies on B. integrifolia suggest that its proteoid root mat achieves this by chemically modifying its soil environment.

B. integrifolia flowers have an unusually short life span for Banksia species, producing nectar for only about four to twelve days after anthesis. Most nectar is produced during the night and early in the morning, with only small amounts produced during the day. Flowers are produced all through the year, but there is a strong peak in autumn. Little else flowers within its range at this time, so it is a seasonally important source of food for nectariferous animals. Surveys have observed a range of animals feeding on the species, including a wide range of insects; many species of bird including Phylidonyris novaehollandiae (New Holland honeyeater), Anthochaera carunculata (red wattlebird), Anthochaera chrysoptera (little wattlebird), Acanthorhynchus tenuirostris (eastern spinebill) and Trichoglossus moluccanus (rainbow lorikeet); and mammals such as Petaurus norfolcensis (squirrel glider), Petaurus breviceps (sugar glider), Acrobates pygmaeus (feathertail glider), Pteropus poliocephalus (grey-headed flying fox), and Syconycteris australis (common blossom bat). In some areas such as at Bungawalbin National Park in northern New South Wales, B. integrifolia is the only source of nectar and pollen in the autumn (March–April) and late winter (July). The importance of non-flying mammals to pollination of B. integrifolia was demonstrated in 1989, with a study in Wilsons Promontory National Park showing a reduction of fruit set when measures were taken to exclude them. Banksia integrifolia is the host plant of the lichen species Arthonia banksiae. Microscopic Eriophyid mites (Eriophyidae) cause galls on young infructescences of B. integrifolia.

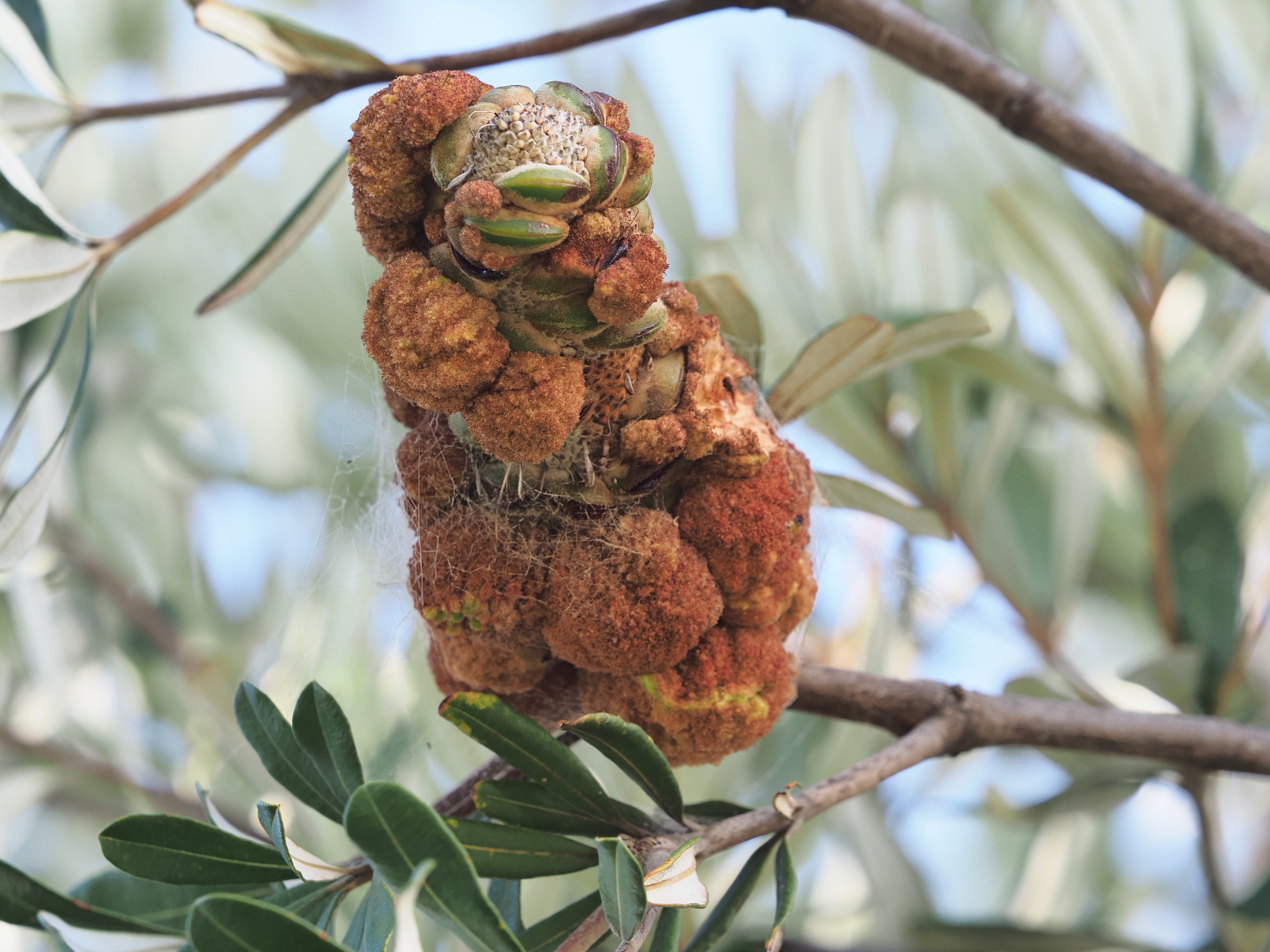
Galls caused by an Eriophyid mite (Eriophyidae) on Banksia integrifolia infructescence in Melbourne, Australia

Unlike most Banksia species, B. integrifolia does not require bushfire to trigger the release of its seed. Rather, seed is released spontaneously on reaching maturity in late summer. The species' non-reliance on fire for seed dispersal suggests that the exclusion of fire would not affect plant populations, but a number of studies have found the opposite to be true: in areas where fire has been excluded for many years, populations have declined substantially. An investigation into the defoliation and premature death of trees on the Yanakie Isthmus in south Victoria reached the tentative conclusion that the absence of fire had created unhealthy surface soil conditions. On the Mornington Peninsula, surveys of an area that had not been burnt since the 1890s found that B. integrifolia densities fell by 77% between 1977 and 2000. A subsequent study found the decline to have been caused by extremely high seedling mortality rates, due to grazing by herbivores and intense competition for soil moisture during summer. Despite acknowledging that "the role of fire in these systems remains unclear", it concluded that "developing fire and/or grazing management regimes will be necessary to conserve the structural integrity of these coastal ecosystems."

These concerns aside, B. integrifolia does not appear to be under threat. It is highly resistant to Phytophthora cinnamomi dieback, which poses a major threat to many other Banksia species; and its wide distribution protects against the threat of habitat loss due to land clearing. As a result, it does not appear on the list of threatened flora of Australia under the Environment Protection and Biodiversity Conservation Act 1999.

== Cultivation ==
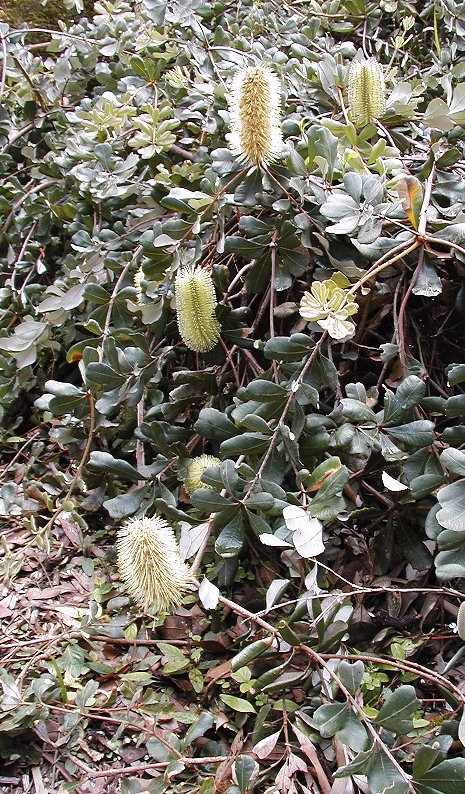
B. 'Roller Coaster', Sylvan Grove Gardens, Picnic Point, New South Wales

Hardy and versatile, B. integrifolia will grow in clay, sand, acid and even alkaline soils, and it shows good resistance to wind and salt, making it suitable for seaside planting. It is therefore highly regarded as a low-maintenance garden tree, although its large size makes it unsuitable for smaller gardens. Its hardiness may, however, forewarn weed potential, as some evidence of weediness has been seen in South Africa, Western Australia and New Zealand. When growing near bushland within its native habitat, it is suggested to obtain local provenance plants if available.

The most common form available in commercial nurseries is unimproved Banksia integrifolia subsp. integrifolia. It prefers a sunny aspect without exposure to frosts, and tolerates fairly heavy pruning. Seeds do not require any treatment, and take 5 to 6 weeks to germinate. Flowering begins at around four to six years from seed. The other subspecies are less well known in cultivation, but are obtainable. Cultivation is presumably similar to B. integrifolia subsp. integrifolia, except that B. integrifolia subsp. monticola may be assumed frost-tolerant. Dwarf forms of B. integrifolia are sometimes sold, and a registered prostrate cultivar, Banksia 'Roller Coaster', is available. The latter is a vigorous ground-hugging plant that can spread to 4 or 5 metres (13 or 16 ft) across yet remains only 50 cm (20 in) high.

Because of its high resistance to P. cinnamomi dieback, the feasibility of using B. integrifolia as a rootstock for susceptible Banksia species in the cut flower trade is under investigation. Presently, the success rate for grafting is only 30–40%, and even with successful grafts there is a tendency for the union to fail under stress. More research is needed before the technique will be ready for commercial use.

== Other uses ==
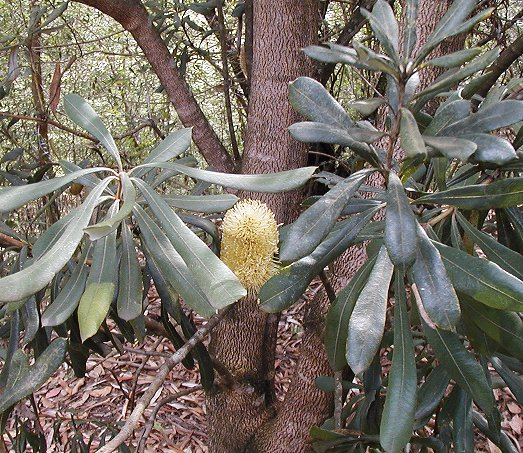
B. integrifolia subsp. compar

The wood of B. integrifolia is pink to red, with inconspicuous rings and conspicuous rays. It is spongy and porous, with a density of around 530 kg/m^{3} (33 lb/cu ft). It is considered highly decorative, but it warps badly on drying, has poor load-bearing qualities, and is susceptible to termite attack; it is therefore unsuitable for most construction purposes. It is sometimes used for cabinet panelling and in ornamental turnery, and natural bends were once sought after for making boat knees. It is a useful firewood.

B. integrifolia produces a dark amber-coloured honey of middling quality and therefore low commercial value. Despite this, the species is highly valued by beekeepers because it produces large amounts of pollen and nectar during autumn and winter, thus helping support hives at a time when little else is flowering.

Historically, indigenous Australians obtained nectar from B. integrifolia by stroking the flower spikes then licking their hands, or by steeping flower spikes in a coolamon overnight. They also used the flower spikes as hairbrushes. Early settlers used the nectar as a syrup for sore throats and colds; and bushmen would impregnate barren "cones" with fat to make a slow-burning candle.

More recently, B. integrifolia has been used in the art of bonsai. Its rangy habit and long internodes are challenging to overcome, but the leaves do reduce with pruning, and unlike the gnarlier B. serrata (saw banksia) its trunk can become textured with age.

It is used as a floral emblem by two local government areas of Queensland: the City of Redcliffe and the City of Logan. In 2000 it was featured on an Australian postage stamp.
