= Supplementum Plantarum =

1782 book by Carolus Linnaeus the Younger

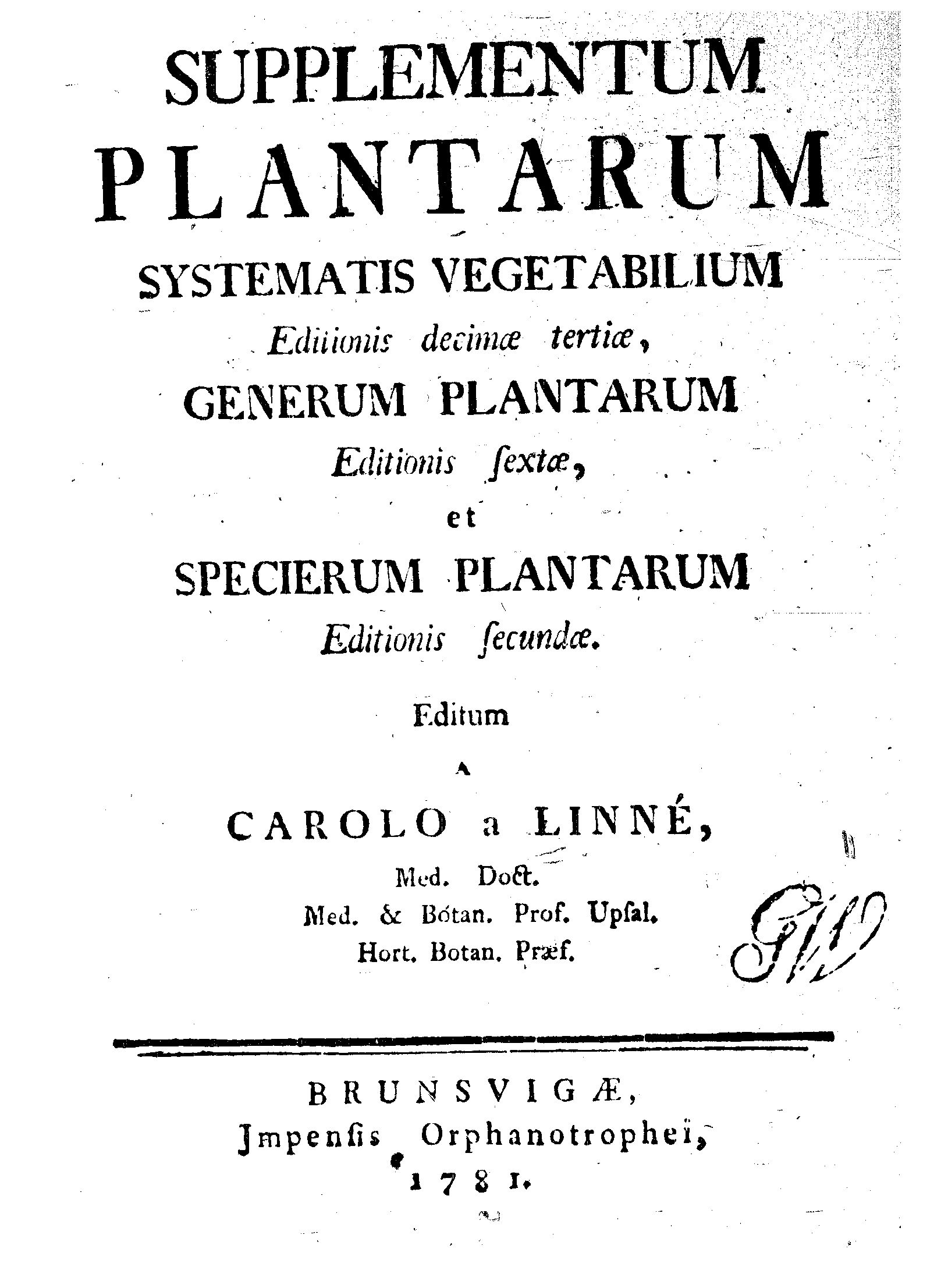
The cover page of Supplementum Plantarum

Supplementum Plantarum Systematis Vegetabilium Editionis Decimae Tertiae, Generum Plantarum Editiones Sextae, et Specierum Plantarum Editionis Secundae, commonly abbreviated to Supplementum Plantarum Systematis Vegetabilium or just Supplementum Plantarum, and further abbreviated by botanists to Suppl. Pl., is a 1782 book by Carolus Linnaeus the Younger. Written entirely in Latin, it was intended as a supplement to the 1737 Genera Plantarum and the 1753 Species Plantarum, both written by the author's father, the "father of modern taxonomy", Carl Linnaeus.

Its full title means: "Supplement of Plants, the 13th edition of A System of Vegetables, the 6th edition of The Genera of Plants and the 2nd edition of The Species of Plants", listing the components of the book in order of presentation. The Systematis Vegetabilium (13th edition) in the title refers to Systema Naturæ as published in 1774 by Johan Andreas Murray, a student of Linnaeus, Sr.

The cover page indicates that it was published in 1781, and it was long believed to have been published in October of that year. In 1976, however, Hermann Manitz used a letter written by Jakob Friedrich Ehrhart to show that it had in fact been published in April 1782.

Furthermore, the cover page states that the book was originally printed in Brunswick (Brunvigæ), Lower Saxony, northwestern Germany by the printshop Orphanotropheum (impensis Orphanotrophei means 'At the expense of the Orphanotropheum'). The book has 467 pages.

The work was translated by Erasmus Darwin's Lichfield Botanical Society as A System of Vegetables (1785). It leaves the binomial nomenclature untranslated in the original Latin, but uses English in the keys and descriptions.
