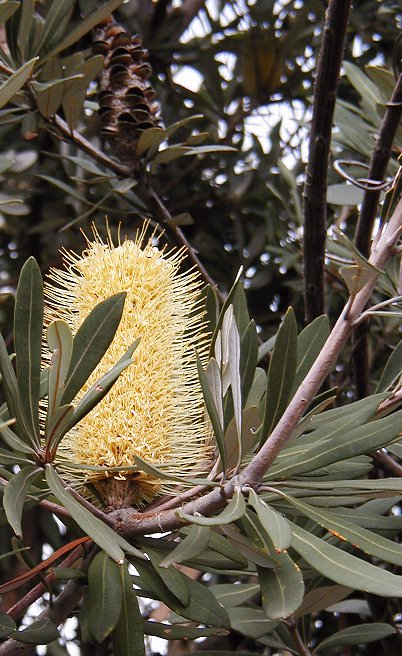

Scientific classification
- Kingdom: Plantae
- Clade: Tracheophytes
- Clade: Angiosperms
- Clade: Eudicots
- Order: Proteales
- Family: Proteaceae
- Genus: Banksia
- Species: B. integrifolia L.f.
- Subspecies: B. i. subsp. integrifolia

Trinomial name
- Banksia integrifolia subsp. integrifolia

= Banksia integrifolia subsp. integrifolia =

Subspecies of plant from eastern Australia

Banksia integrifolia subsp. integrifolia is a subspecies of Banksia integrifolia.

== Description ==
Banksia integrifolia subsp. integrifolia can be distinguished from the other subspecies of B. integrifolia by its slightly smaller, broader leaves, which are also somewhat duller than those of B. integrifolia subsp. compar.

== Taxonomy ==
The type material for B. integrifolia subsp. integrifolia was first collected at Botany Bay on 29 April 1770 by Sir Joseph Banks and Dr Daniel Solander, naturalists on the Endeavour during Lieutenant (later Captain) James Cook's first voyage to the Pacific Ocean. Published as "Banksia integrifolia L.f." by Carolus Linnaeus the Younger in April 1782, it was maintained at species rank until 1913, when Frederick Bailey published B. integrifolia var. compar. This created the autonym Banksia integrifolia L.f. var. integrifolia. In 1994, Kevin Thiele promoted B. integrifolia var. compar to subspecies rank, publishing another subspecies at the same time. This had the effect of promoting the autonym to subspecies rank also, thus creating B. integrifolia L.f. subsp. integrifolia.

== Distribution and habitat ==
Banksia integrifolia subsp. integrifolia is generally found on infertile, sandy soils within 50 kilometres (30 mi) of the coast. Endemic to Australia, it occurs from around Bundaberg, Queensland south along the coast to Geelong, Victoria. There are records of collections on islands in Bass Strait, but it appears to be extinct there now.
