= Eastern Suburbs Banksia Scrub =

Indigenous woodland community in Sydney, Australia

Eastern Suburbs Banksia Scrub/ Sydney Coastal Heaths
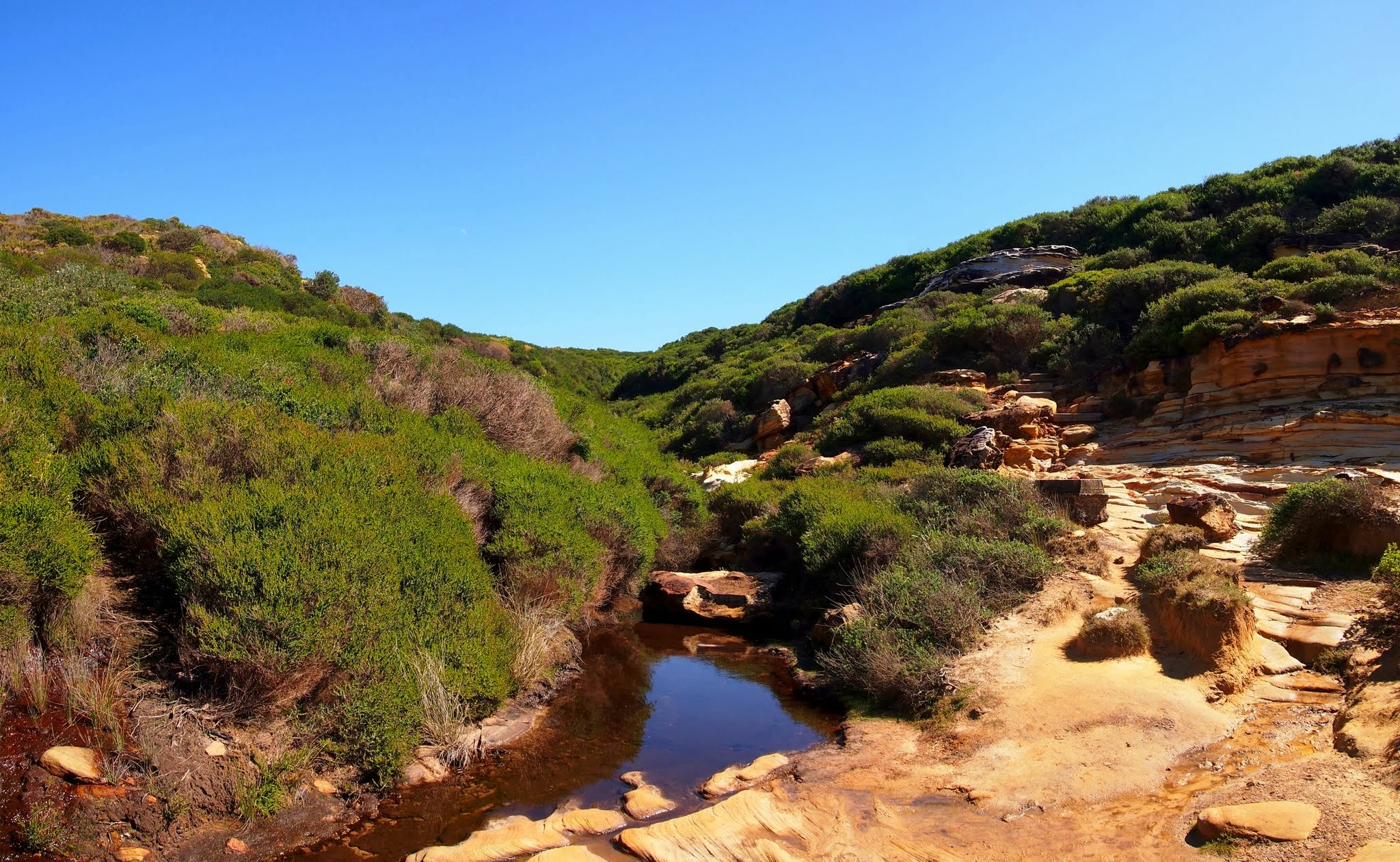
- Bundeena, Royal National Park

Ecology
- Realm: Australasia
- Biome: Temperate grasslands, savannas, and shrublands
- Borders: Shale Sandstone Transition Forest; Sydney Turpentine-Ironbark Forest; Themeda Grassland

Geography
- Area: 1.46 km^{2} (0.56 sq mi)
- Country: Australia
- Elevation: 60–100 metres (200–330 ft)
- Coordinates: 33°55′1″S 151°15′59″E
- Geology: Sandstone, shale
- Climate type: Humid subtropical climate (Cfa)
- Soil types: Clay, sand

The Eastern Suburbs Banksia Scrub, which also incorporates Sydney Coastal Heaths, is a remnant sclerophyll scrubland and heathland that is found in the eastern and southern regions of Sydney, New South Wales, Australia. Listed under the Environment Protection and Biodiversity Conservation Act 1999 as and endangered vegetation community and as 'critically endangered' under the NSW Biodiversity Conservation Act 2016, the Eastern Suburbs Banksia Scrub is found on ancient, nutrient poor sands either on dunes or on promontories. Sydney coastal heaths are a scrubby heathland found on exposed coastal sandstone plateau in the south.

== Geography ==
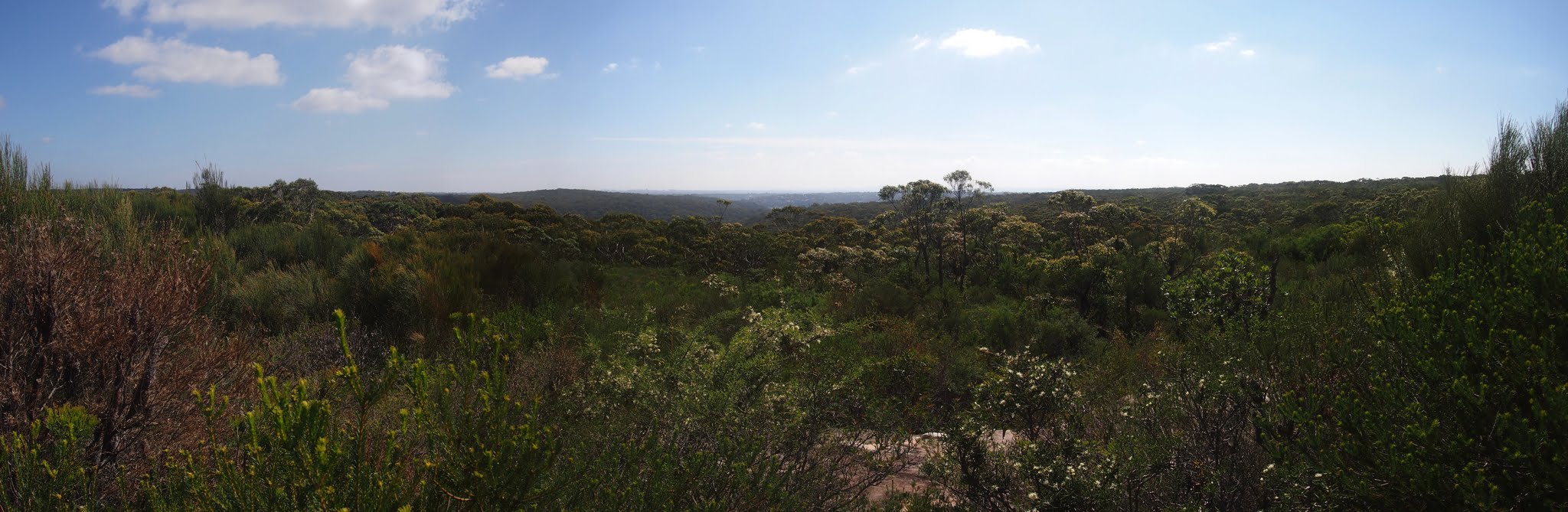
A scrubby heathland near Warumbul

The scrubland is found on wind-blown (aeolian) sands in coastal areas such as the Sydney Heads south to the Kamay Botany Bay National Park and Royal National Park, but has remnants between the Hawkesbury River in the north, and Stanwell Park, at the southern boundary.

It was once present as an almost uninterrupted band near the coastal perimeter of Sydney, where it covered 5,300 hectares of land between North Head and Botany Bay, but now there are very few parts left in Sydney, with only around 5-10% of the original area present. It mainly occurs on senescent and nutrient poor sands either on dunes, sandplains or on headlands.

It is now recorded in the local government areas of Botany, Randwick, Waverley, and Manly Councils. The heathlands are recorded in the coastal sandstone plateau, which grade into dry sclerophyll forests.

== Ecology ==
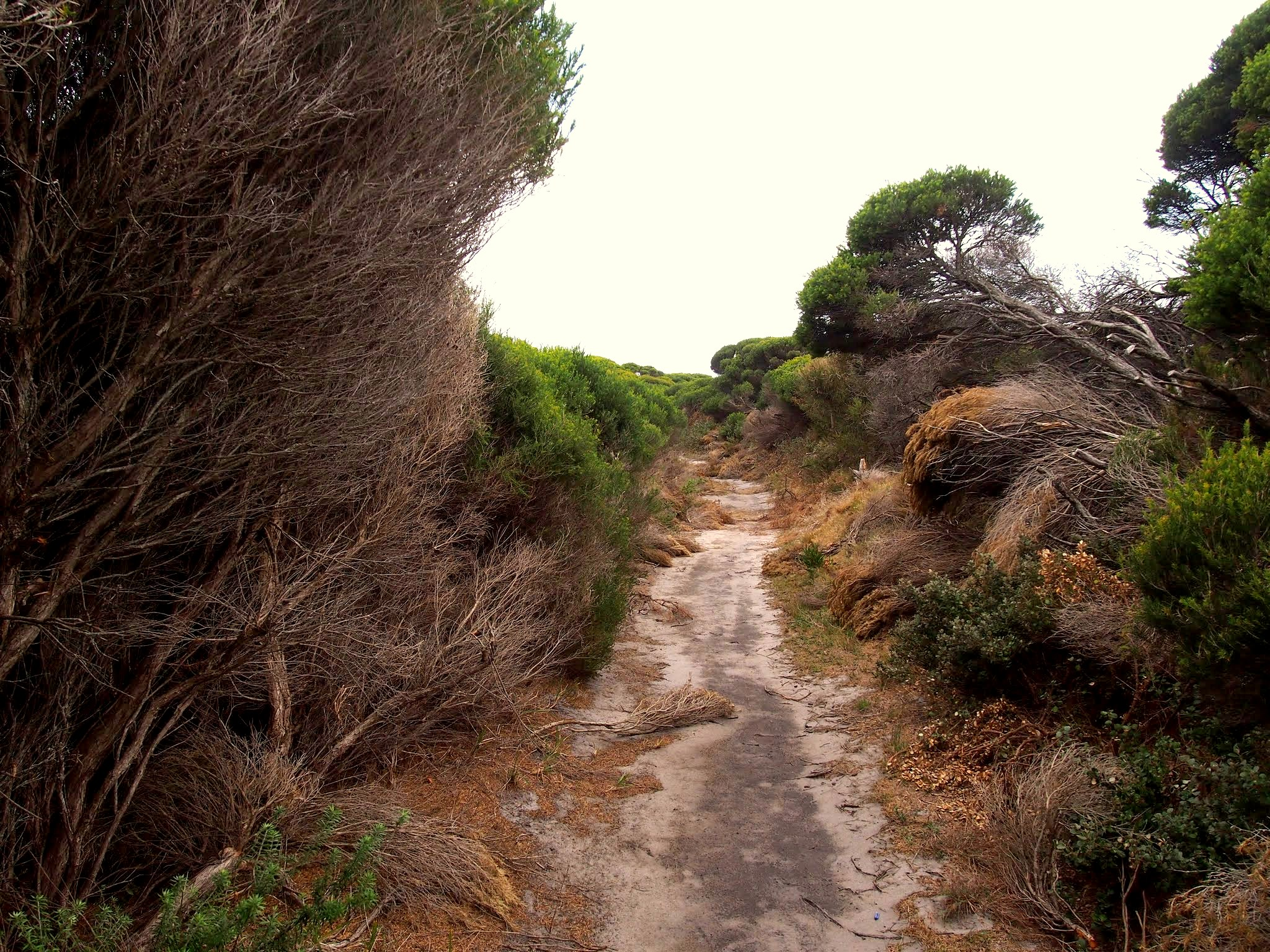
A walking track surrounded by heath and scrub in Botany Bay

The community generally features sclerophyllous heath or scrub species on coastal sandstone highland with infertile, shallow, somewhat moist soils, although small residue of woodland and low forest may occur.

It is dominated by woody shrub species, such as Banksia aemula, Banksia serrata, Gaudium laevigatum, Monotoca elliptica, Acacia longifolia, and Acacia suaveolens; and stunted eucalypts, such as Corymbia gummifera and Angophora costata. Mallee varieties of Corymbia gummifera, Eucalyptus camfieldii, Eucalyptus luehmanniana, and Eucalyptus obstans may be found on coastal heaths.

Understorey species include Pimelea linifolia, Persoonia lanceolata, Philotheca salsolifolia, Pimelea linifolia, Ricinocarpos pinifolius, Styphelia viridis, Xanthorrhoea resinosa, Haemodorum planifolium, Hypolaena fastigiata, Lepidosperma concavum, Lomandra glauca, Xanthosia pilosa, Bossiaea, and Lepidosperma concavum.

Shrubs on the coastal heaths include Allocasuarina distyla, Angophora hispida, Banksia ericifolia, Conospermum taxifolium, Darwinia diminuta, Dillwynia floribunda, Epacris microphylla, Grevillea oleoides, Grevillea sphacelata, Hakea teretifolia, Isopogon anemonifolius, Leptospermum squarrosum, Leptospermum trinervium, Leucopogon microphyllus, Persoonia lanceolata, Pultenaea tuberculata, and Xanthorrhoea resinifera.

=== Fauna ===
Animals include eastern pygmy possum, New Holland honeyeater, brown antechinus, and long-nosed bandicoot. New Holland honeyeaters (Phylidonyris novaehollandiae) are crucial pollinators of flowering plants in the scrubland.

== See also ==
- Sydney Sandstone Ridgetop Woodland
- Chaparral
- Garrigue
