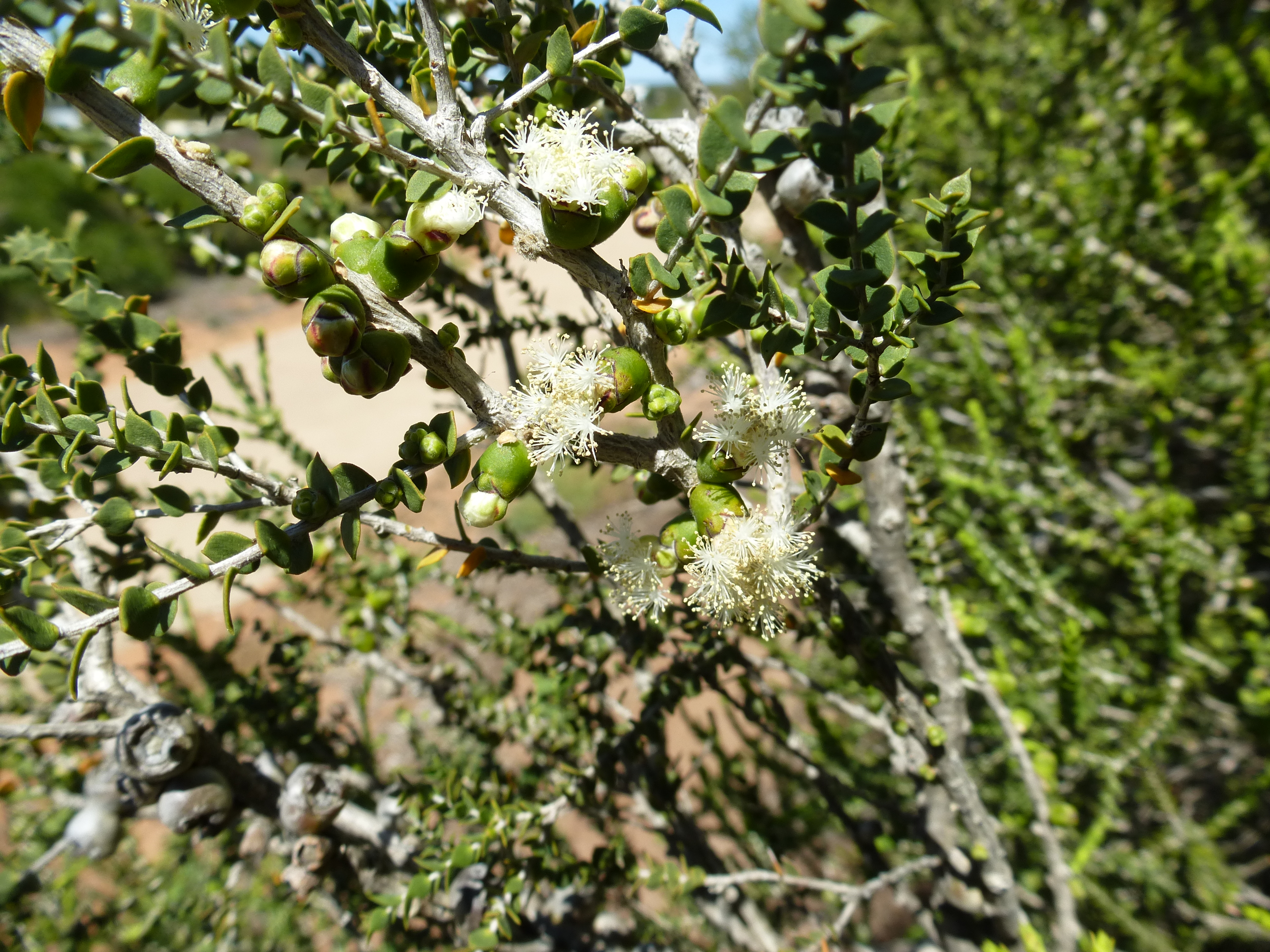

Scientific classification
- Kingdom: Plantae
- Clade: Tracheophytes
- Clade: Angiosperms
- Clade: Eudicots
- Clade: Rosids
- Order: Myrtales
- Family: Myrtaceae
- Genus: Melaleuca
- Species: M. cardiophylla

Binomial name
- Melaleuca cardiophylla F.Muell.

Synonyms
- Myrtoleucodendron cardiophyllum (F.Muell.) Kuntze

= Melaleuca cardiophylla =

Umbrella bush

Species of flowering plant

Melaleuca cardiophylla, commonly known as tangling melaleuca or umbrella bush is a plant in the myrtle family, Myrtaceae and is endemic to the west and south-west of Western Australia. It is a dense, prickly shrub with heart-shaped leaves, stamens that are joined in unusually long claw-like bundles, and distinctive, warty fruits.

== Description ==
Melaleuca cardiophylla is a shrub growing to a height of 3.5 m (10 ft). The leaves are arranged alternately with the stalk of the leaf attached to the underside of the leaf. They are 2–8.5 mm (0.08–0.3 in) long and 1.75–6.5 mm (0.07–0.3 in) wide with about 12 to 20 longitudinal veins and end in a point that is often sharp.

The flowers are arranged in groups of 1 to 5 along considerable lengths of the branches. The petals and sepals have edges that are almost transparent and the petals fall from the flower soon after it opens. The stamens are white or cream and arranged in five bundles around the flower, each bundle having the appearance of a claw. Flowering time is variable but is usually between August and January. The fruit are almost spherical, knobbly, woody capsules that are larger than those of most other melaleucas at about 10 mm (0.4 in) diameter.

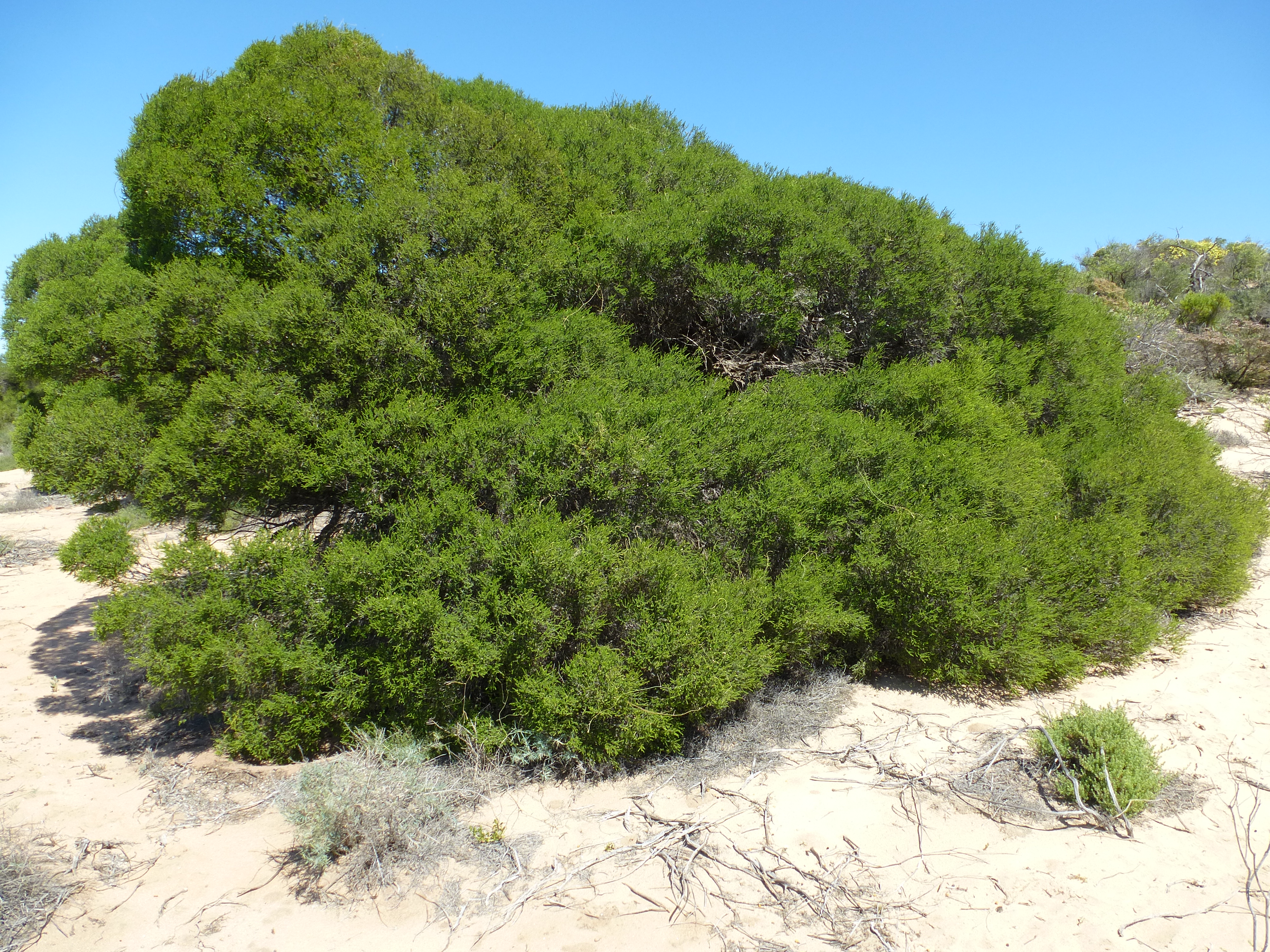
Habit near the coast at Kalbarri

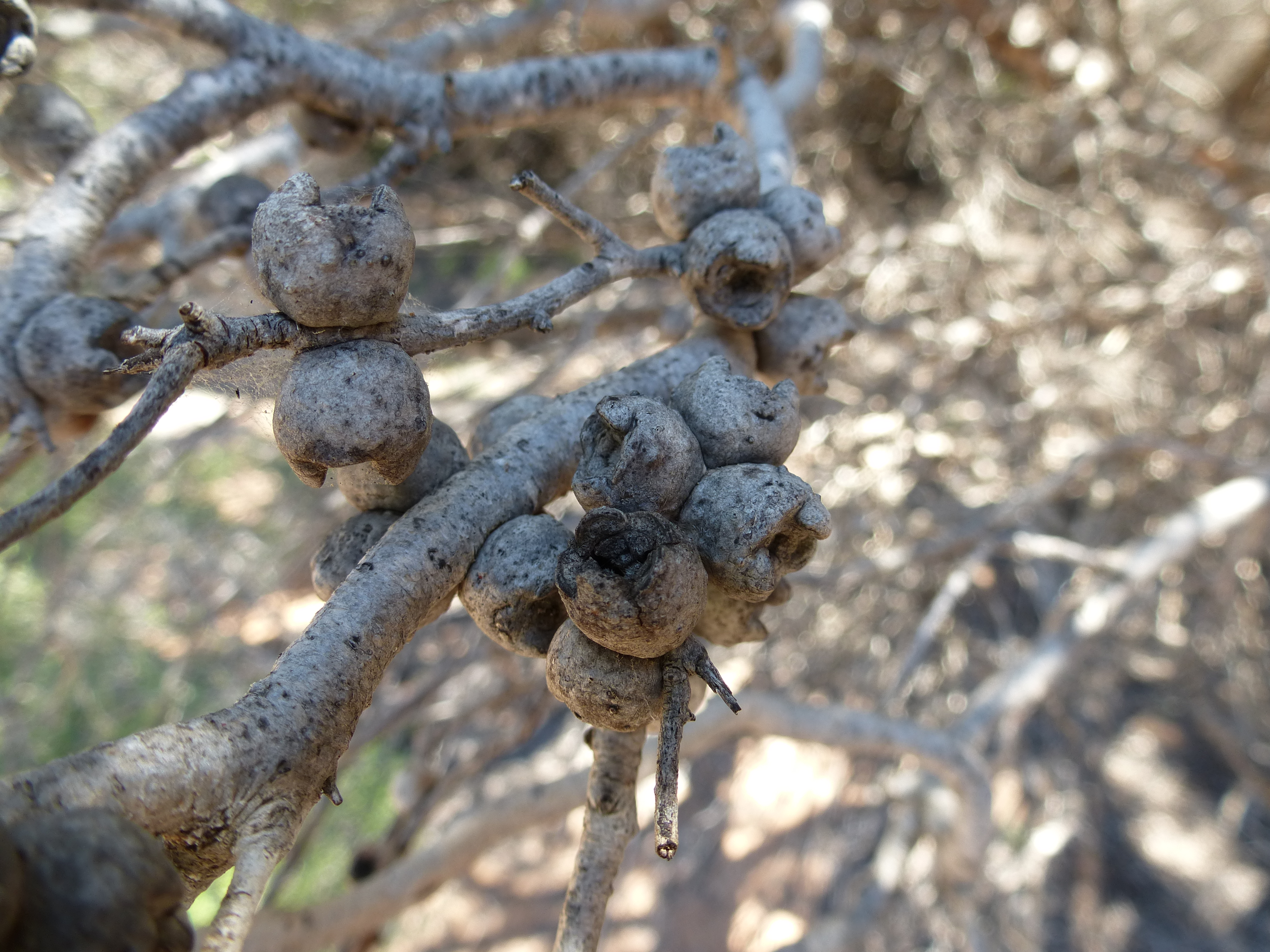
Fruit

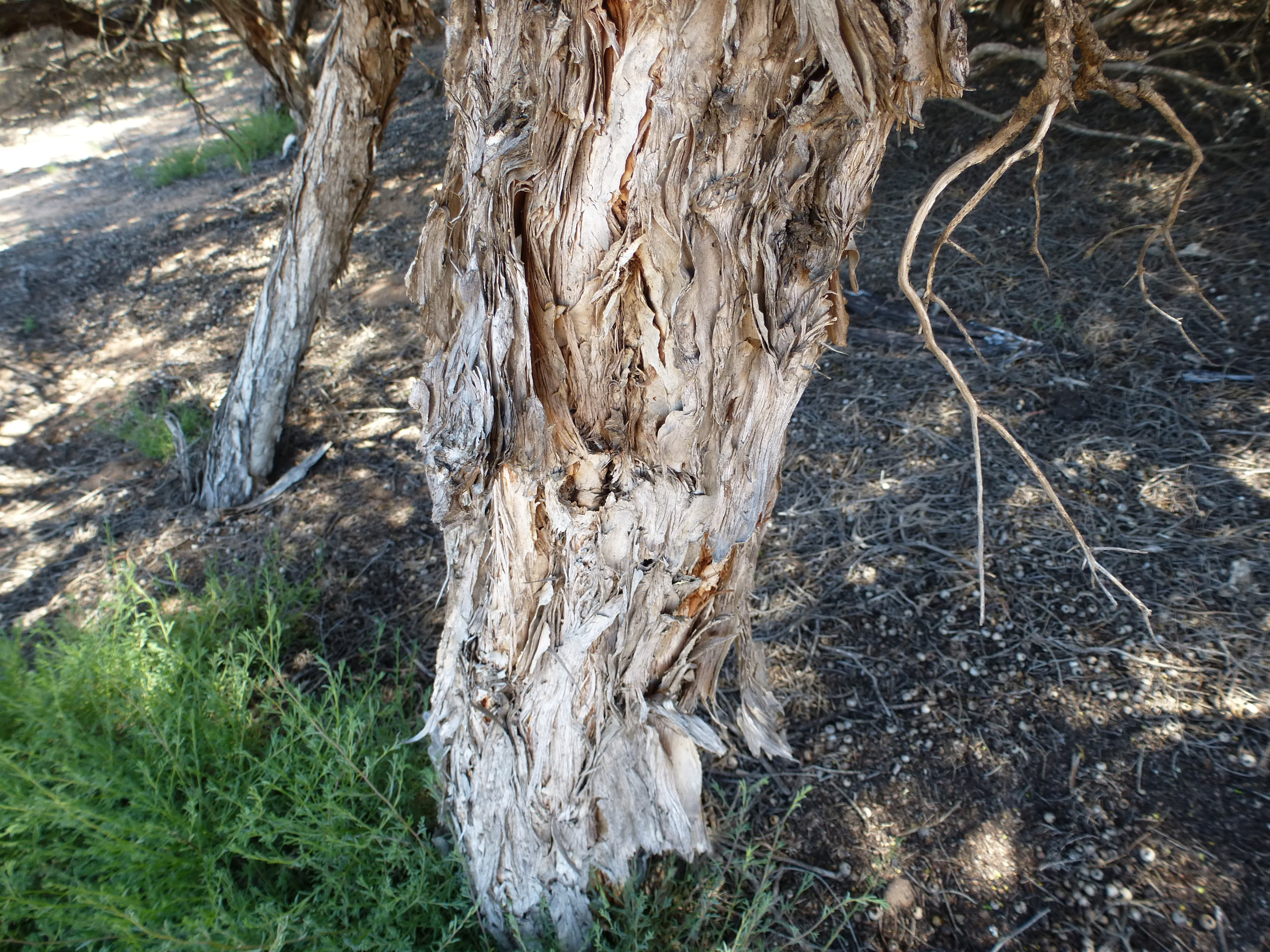
Bark

== Taxonomy and naming ==
Melaleuca cardiophylla was first formally described in 1859 by Ferdinand von Mueller in Fragmenta Phytographiae Australiae from a specimen found "at Port Gregory by Augustus Oldfield". The specific epithet (cardiophylla) is from the Ancient Greek kardia (καρδία) meaning "heart" and phyllon (φύλλον) meaning "leaf", hence "with heart-shaped leaves".

== Distribution and habitat ==
This melaleuca occurs in areas close to the coast between Perth, the Exmouth district and the Pilbara in the Carnarvon, Gascoyne, Geraldton Sandplains, Swan Coastal Plain and Yalgoo biogeographic regions. It grows in sand on limestone and sand dunes often in association with Eucalyptus species such as E. obtusiflora, E. oraria and E. zopherophloia.

== Conservation status ==
Melaleuca cardiophylla is listed as not threatened by the Government of Western Australia Department of Parks and Wildlife.
