= Shrubland =

Vegetation dominated by shrubs

Volcanic scrub on Mauga Mu, Samoa

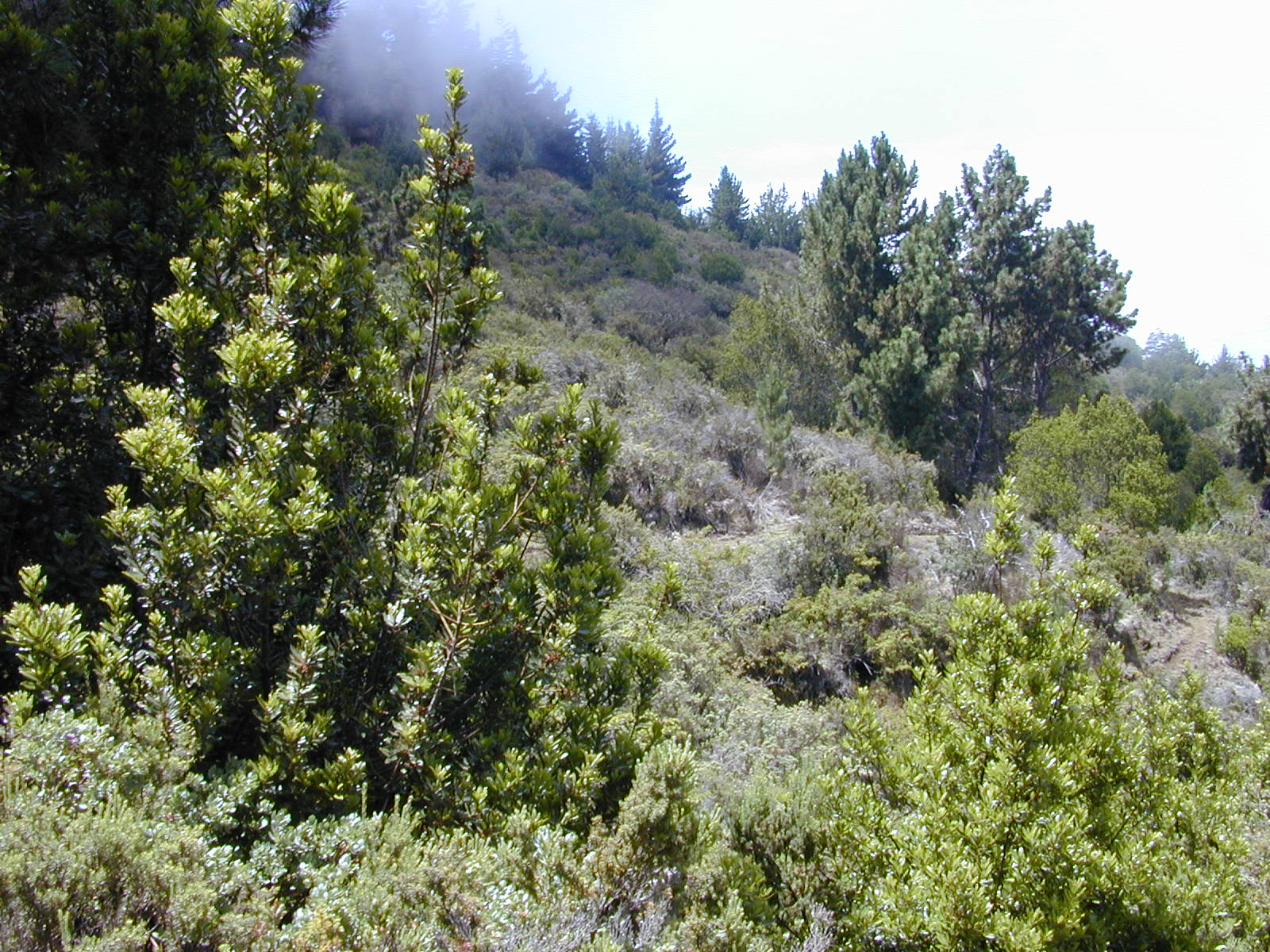
Low shrubland in Hawaii

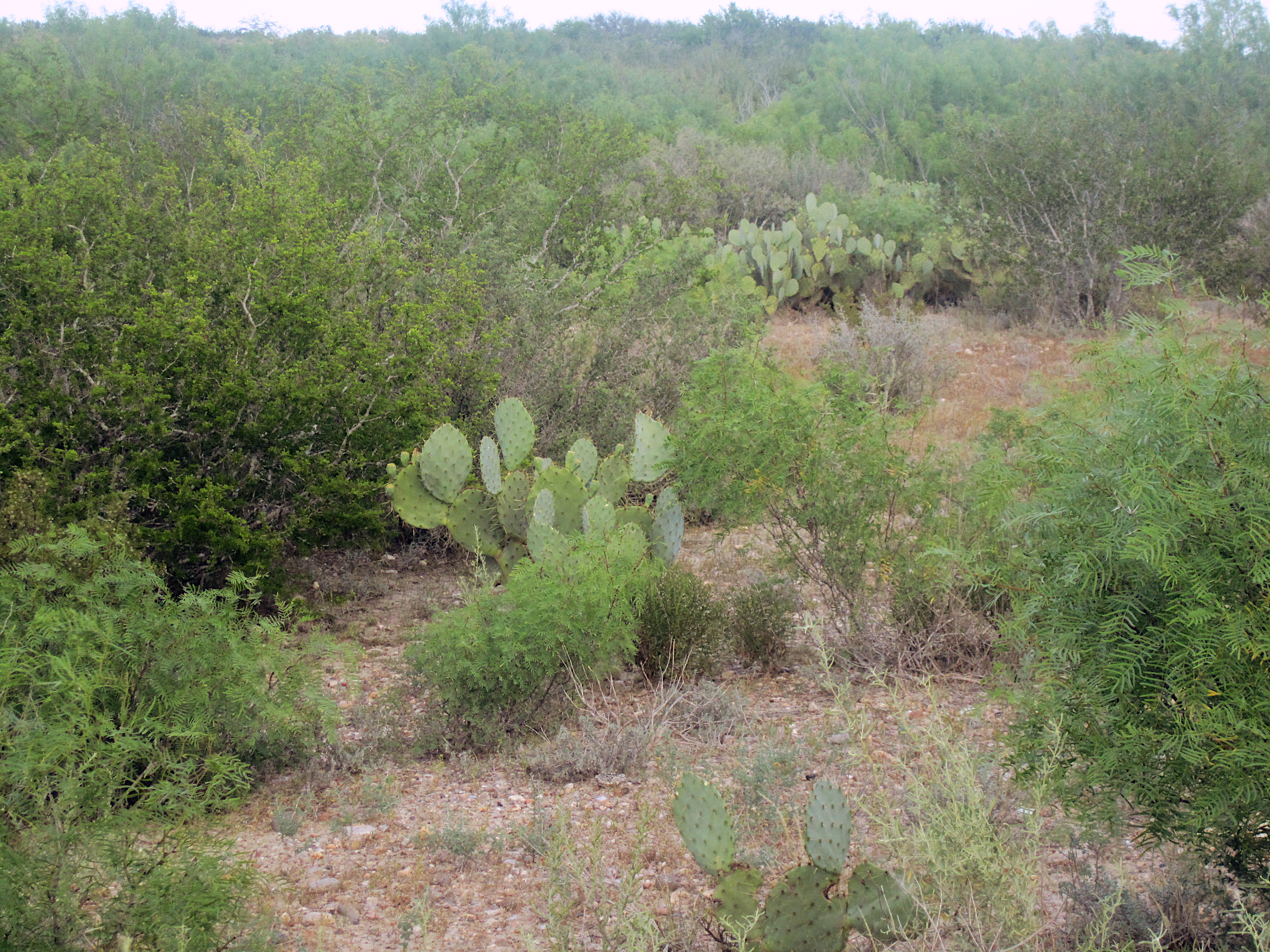
Scrub vegetation with cactus in Webb County in south Texas

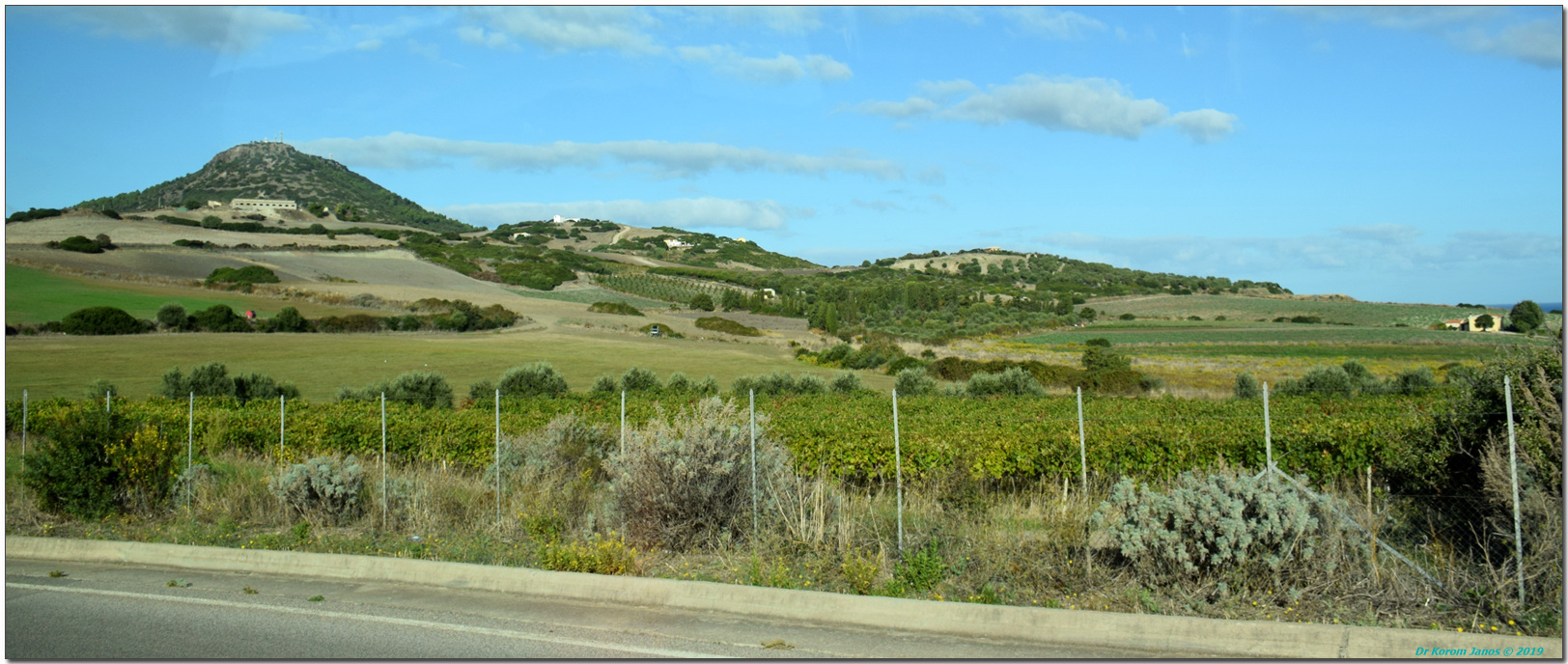
Mediterranean shrubland in Sardinia, Italy

Shrubland, scrubland, scrub, brush, or bush is a plant community characterized by vegetation dominated by shrubs, often also including grasses, herbs, and geophytes. Shrubland may either occur naturally or be the result of human activity, but in the latter case the terms shrubbery or bushes are more commonly used. It may be the mature vegetation type in a particular region and remain stable over time, or it may be a transitional community that occurs temporarily as the result of a disturbance, such as fire. A stable state may be maintained by regular natural disturbance such as fire or browsing.

Shrubland may be unsuitable for human habitation because of the danger of fire. The term was coined in 1903.

Shrubland species generally show a wide range of adaptations to fire, such as heavy seed production, lignotubers, and fire-induced germination.

== Botanical structural form ==
In botany and ecology a shrub is defined as a much-branched woody plant less than 8 m high, usually with many stems. Tall shrubs are mostly 2–8 m high, small shrubs 1–2 m high and subshrubs less than 1 m high.

A descriptive system widely adopted in Australia to describe different types of vegetation is based on structural characteristics and plant life-form, as well as the height and foliage cover of the tallest stratum or dominant species.

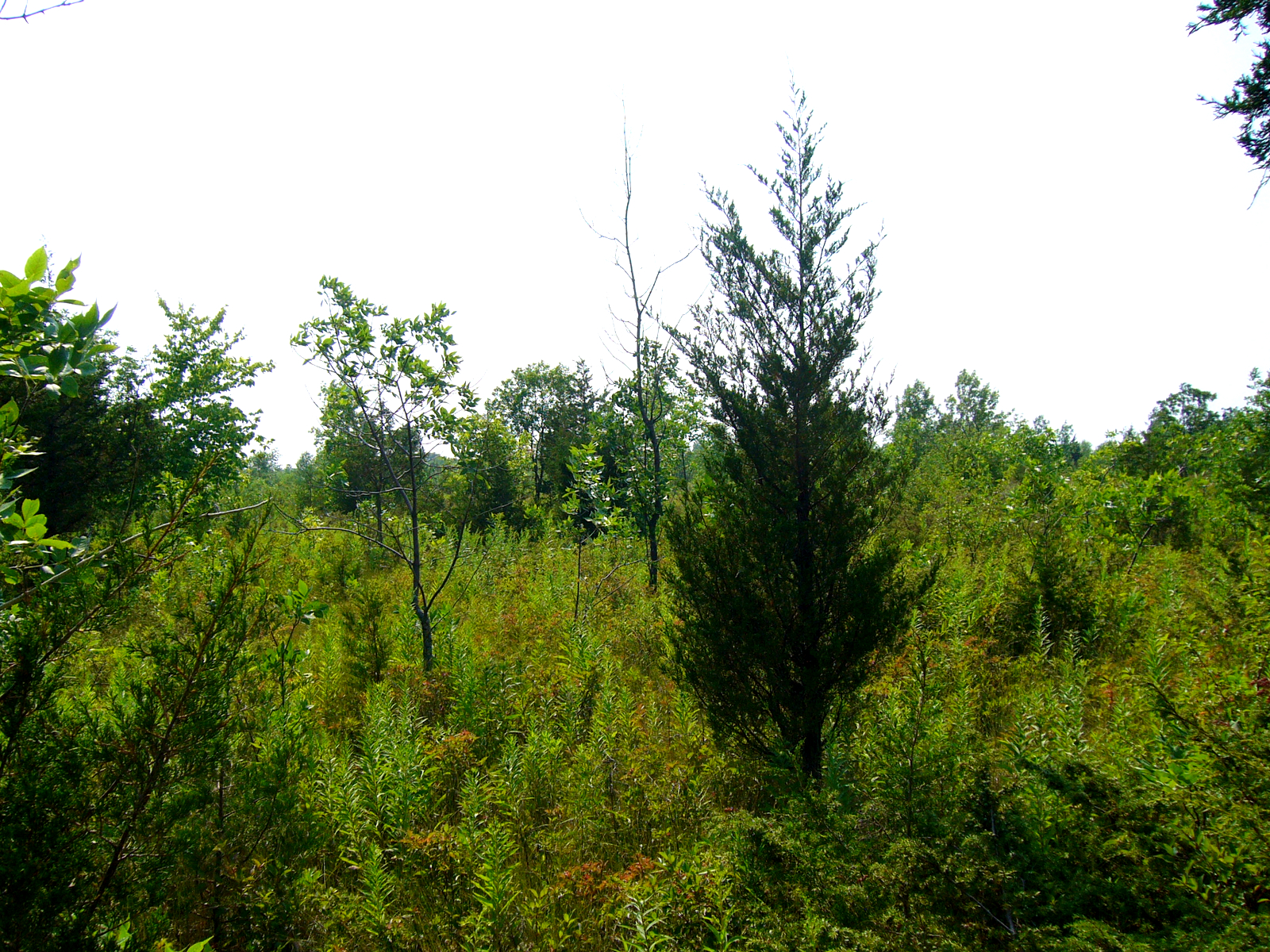
Shrubland in Prince Edward County, Ontario.

For shrubs that are 2–8 metres (6.6–26.2 ft) high, the following structural forms are categorized:

- dense foliage cover (70–100%) — closed-shrubs
- mid-dense foliage cover (30–70%) — open-shrubs
- sparse foliage cover (10–30%) — tall shrubland
- very sparse foliage cover (<10%) — tall open shrubland

For shrubs less than 2 metres (6.6 ft) high, the following structural forms are categorized:

- dense foliage cover (70–100%) — closed-heath or closed low shrubland—(North America)
- mid-dense foliage cover (30–70%) — open-heath or mid-dense low shrubland—(North America)
- sparse foliage cover (10–30%) — low shrubland
- very sparse foliage cover (<10%) — low open shrubland

== Biome plant group ==
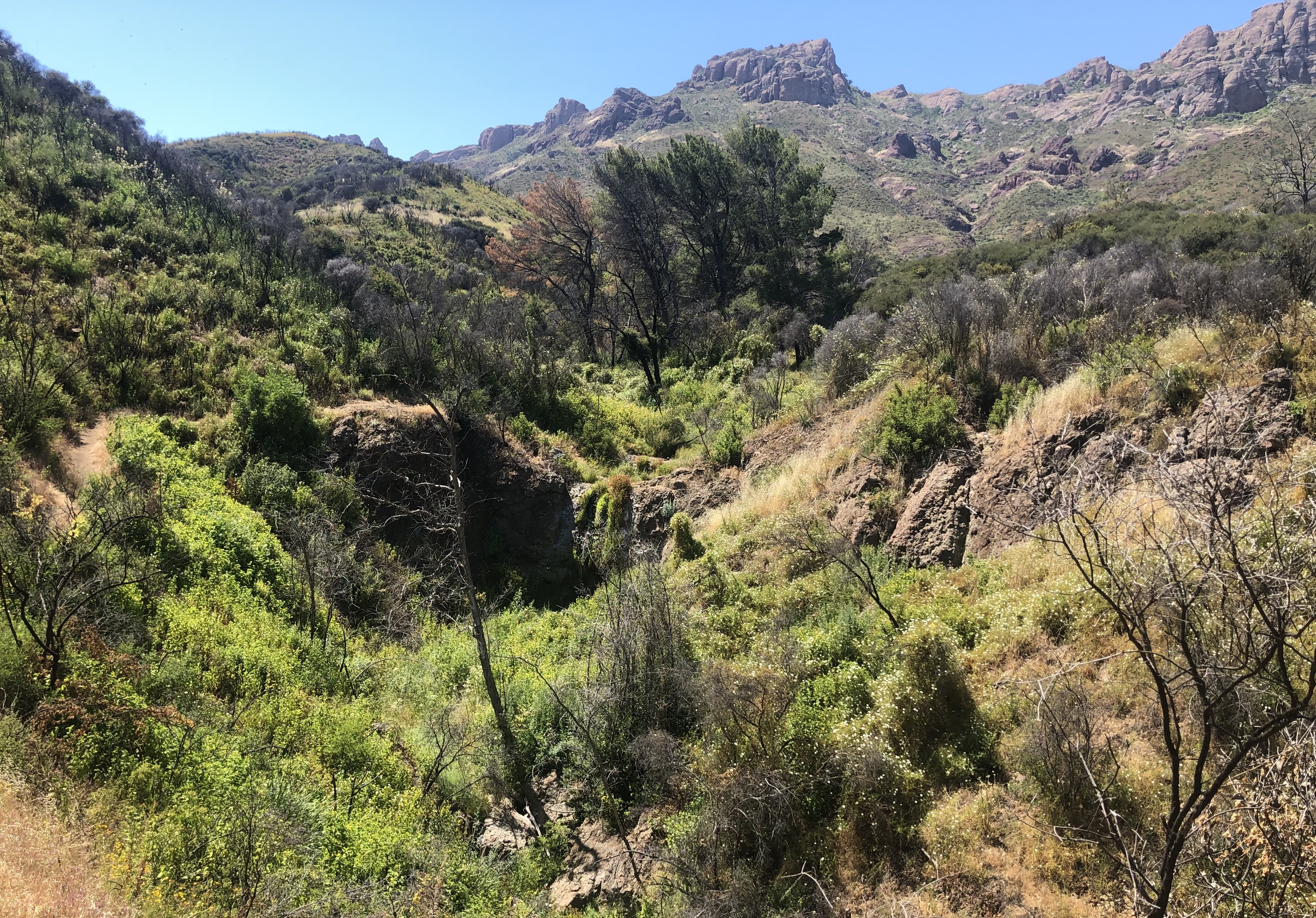
Mixed chaparral habitat in the Santa Monica Mountains National Recreation Area

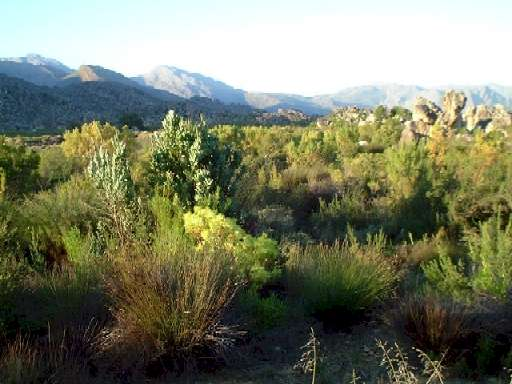
Fynbos in South Africa

Similarly, shrubland is a category that is used to describe a type of biome plant group. In this context, shrublands are dense thickets of evergreen sclerophyll shrubs and small trees, called:

- Chaparral in California
- Matorral in Chile, Mexico, and Spain
- Maquis in France and elsewhere around the Mediterranean
- Macchia in Italy
- Fynbos in South Africa
- Eastern Suburbs Banksia Scrub in Sydney
- Kwongan in Southwest Australia
- Cedar scrub in Texas Hill Country
- Caatinga in northeastern Brazil

In some places, shrubland is the mature vegetation type. In other places, it is the result of degradation of former forest or woodland by logging or overgrazing, or disturbance by major fires.

A number of World Wildlife Fund biomes are characterized as shrublands, including the following:

Desert scrublands

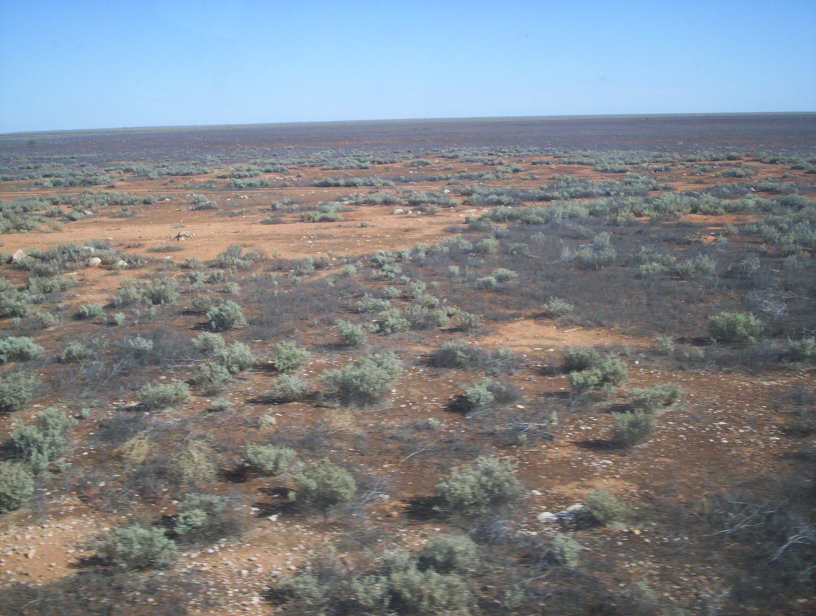
The Nullarbor Plain in Australia

Xeric or desert scrublands occur in the world's deserts and xeric shrublands ecoregions or in fast-draining sandy soils in more humid regions. These scrublands are characterized by plants with adaptations to the dry climate, which include small leaves to limit water loss, thorns to protect them from grazing animals, succulent leaves or stems, storage organs to store water, and long taproots to reach groundwater.

Mediterranean scrublands

Mediterranean scrublands occur naturally in the Mediterranean scrub biome, located in the five Mediterranean climate regions of the world. Scrublands are most common near the seacoast and have often adapted to the wind and salt air of the ocean. Low, soft-leaved scrublands around the Mediterranean Basin are known as garrigue in France, phrygana in Greece, tomillares in Spain, and batha in Israel. Northern coastal scrub and coastal sage scrub occur along the California coast, strandveld in the Western Cape of South Africa, coastal matorral in central Chile, and sand-heath and kwongan in Southwest Australia.

Interior scrublands

Interior scrublands occur naturally in semi-arid areas with nutrient-poor soils, such as on the matas of Portugal, which are underlain by Cambrian and Silurian schists. Florida scrub is another example of interior scrublands.

Dwarf shrubs

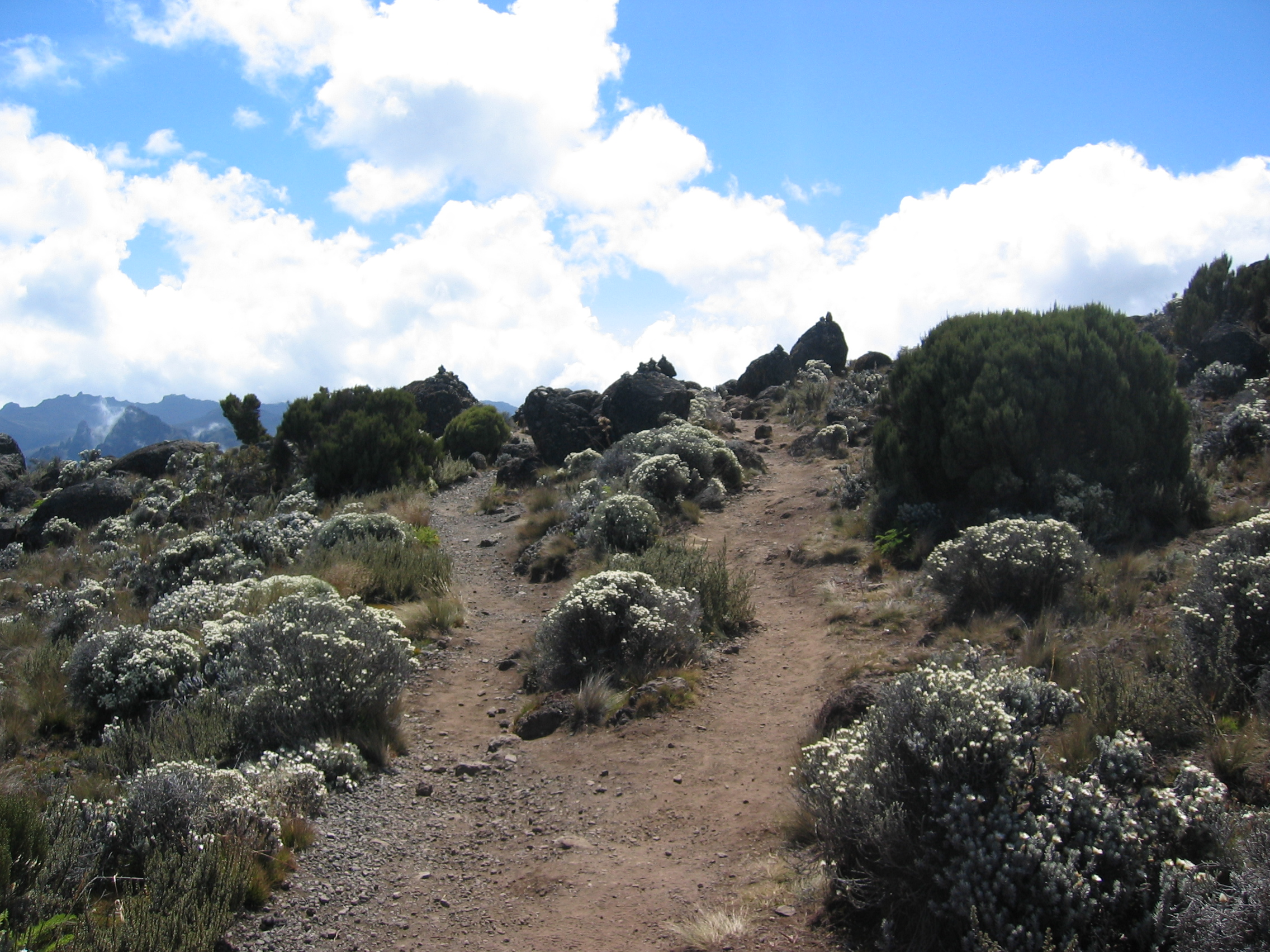
Moorland on Kilimanjaro

Some vegetation types are formed of dwarf-shrubs, low-growing or creeping shrubs. They include the maquis and the garrigues of Mediterranean climates and the acid-loving dwarf shrubs of heathland and moorland.

== See also ==
- Woody plant
- Shrub
- Prostrate shrub
- Semi-desert
- Shrub-steppe
- Shrub swamp
