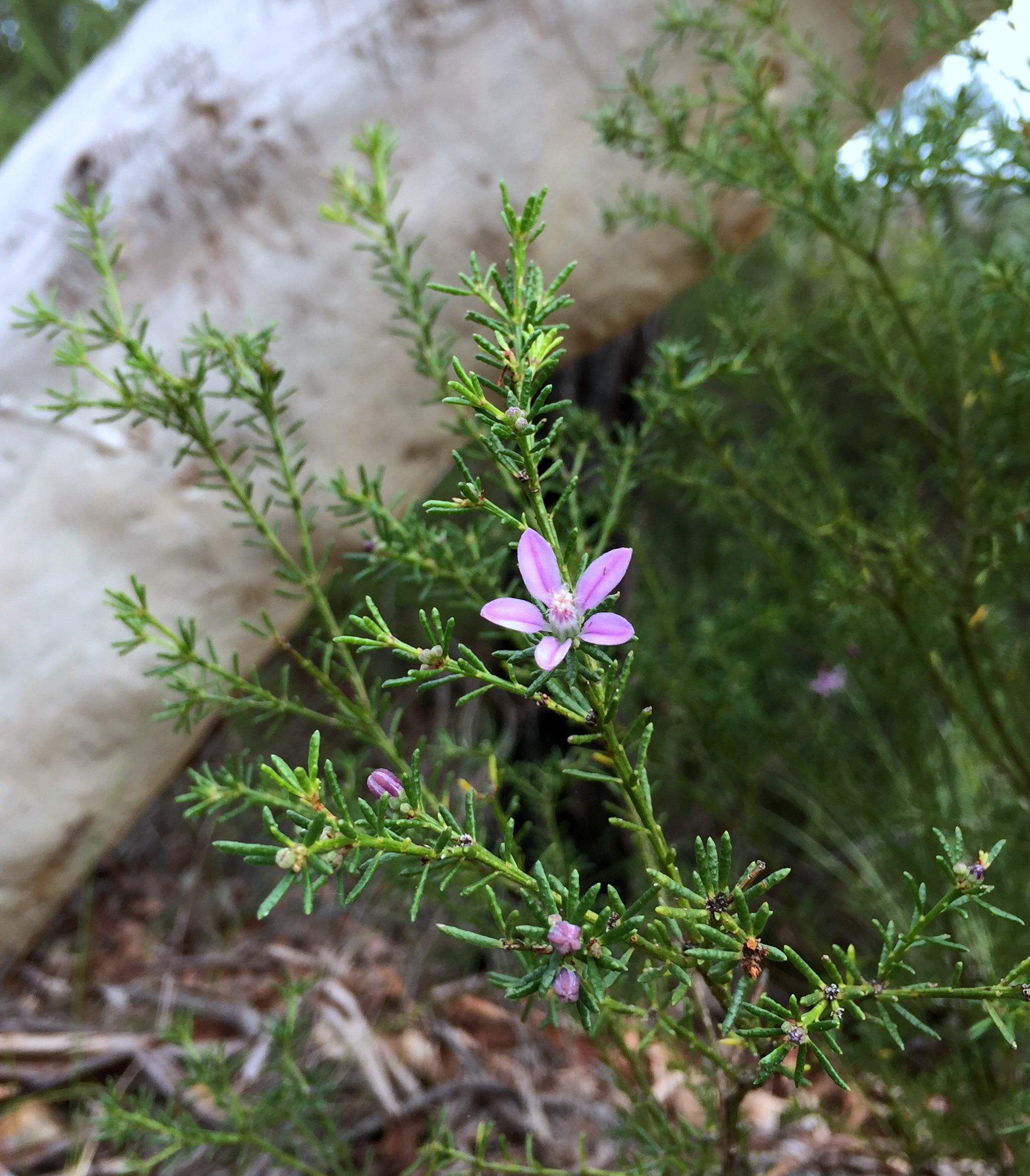
- In Muogamarra Nature Reserve

Scientific classification
- Kingdom: Plantae
- Clade: Tracheophytes
- Clade: Angiosperms
- Clade: Eudicots
- Clade: Rosids
- Order: Sapindales
- Family: Rutaceae
- Genus: Philotheca
- Species: P. salsolifolia

Binomial name
- Philotheca salsolifolia (Sm.) Druce

Synonyms
- Eriostemon gracile Graham; Eriostemon salsolifolia Sm. orth. var.; Eriostemon salsolifolius Sm.; Philotheca australis Rudge nom. illeg.; Philotheca australis Rudge var. australis; Philotheca gaudichaudii G.Don nom. inval., nom. subnud.

= Philotheca salsolifolia =

Species of flowering plant

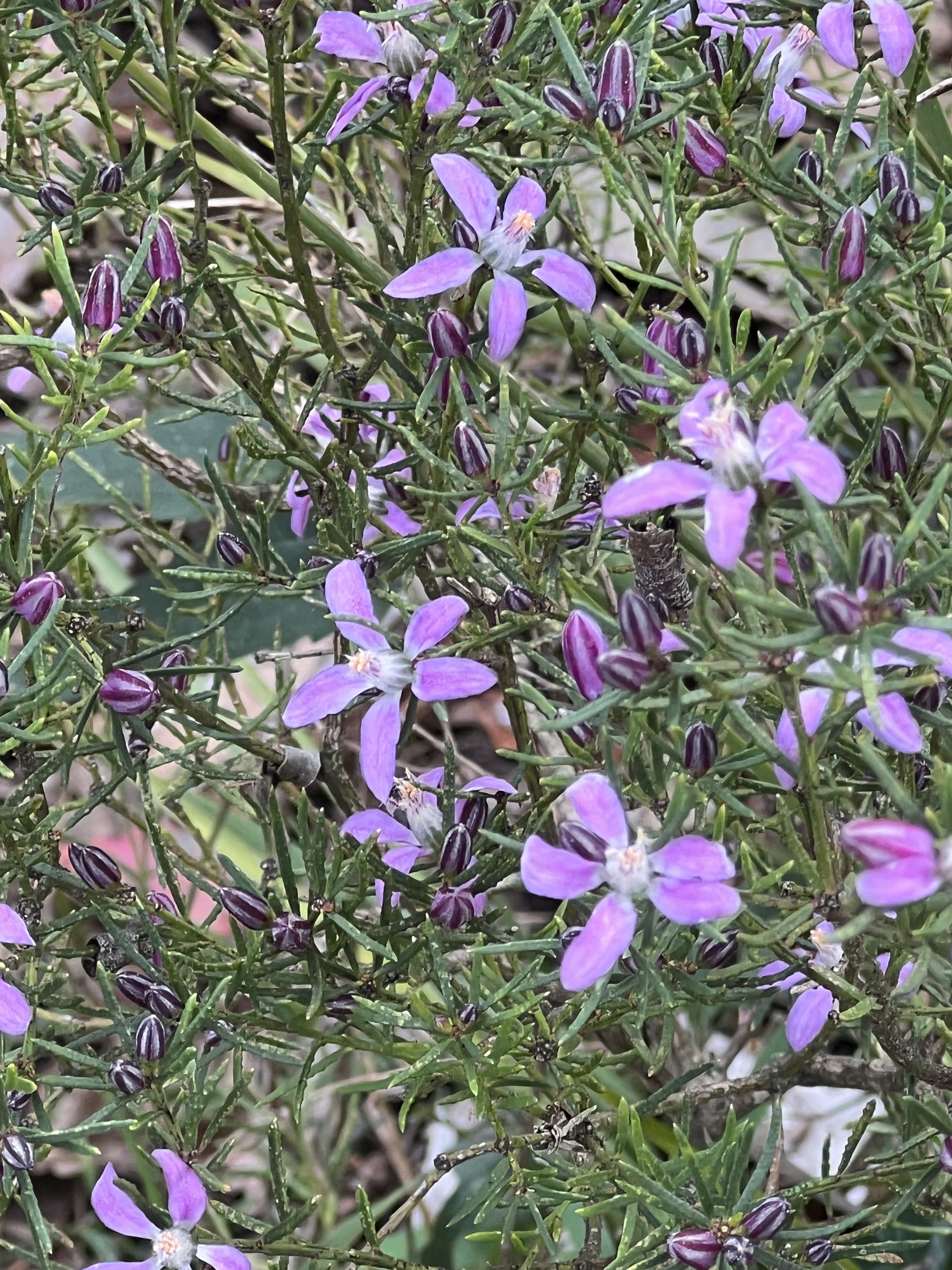
P. salsolifolia subsp. pedicellata

Philotheca salsolifolia is a species of flowering plant in the family Rutaceae and is endemic to New South Wales and the Australian Capital Territory. It is a shrub with crowded, more or less cylindrical leaves and pink to mauve flowers with a dark central stripe and arranged singly or in twos or threes on the ends of branchlets.

== Description ==
Philotheca salsolifolia is a shrub that typically grows to a height of 2 m (6 ft 7 in) and has more or less glabrous branchlets. The leaves are crowded, thick and from cylindrical, 3–5 mm (0.12–0.20 in) long to narrow, pointed and up to 12 mm (0.47 in) long. The flowers are arranged singly or in twos or threes on the ends of branchlets, each flower on a top-shaped pedicel 1–2 mm (0.039–0.079 in) long or a thin pedicel about 8 mm (0.31 in) long. The five sepals are triangular, about 1.5 mm (0.059 in) long and the five petals are narrow elliptic, 6–12 mm (0.24–0.47 in) long and pink to mauve with a dark central stripe. The ten stamens are glabrous, fused together in the lower half, and densely hairy above. Flowering occurs from September to December and the fruit is 5–6 mm (0.20–0.24 in) long with a pointed tip.

== Taxonomy ==
This species was first formally described in 1809 by James Edward Smith and given the name Eriostemon salsolifolius in Rees's The Cyclopaedia. In 1917, George Claridge Druce changed the name to Philotheca salsolifolia in The Botanical Exchange Club and Society of the British Isles Report for 1916, Supplement 2.

In 1998, Paul Wilson described two subspecies in the journal Nuytsia, and the names are accepted by the Australian Plant Census:

- Philotheca salsolifolia subsp. pedicellata Paul G.Wilson has thin pedicels 6–9 mm (0.24–0.35 in) long and leaves 8–15 mm (0.31–0.59 in) long;
- Philotheca salsolifolia (Sm.) Druce subsp. salsolifolia has top-shaped pedicels 1–2 mm (0.039–0.079 in) long and leaves 3–5 mm (0.12–0.20 in) long.

== Distribution and habitat ==
Philotheca salsolifolia grows in heath in rocky or sandy places in forest and woodland. It is widespread in New South Wales and the Australian Capital Territory, from near Yamba in the north to Bega on the south coast and as far inland as West Wyalong and the Pilliga scrub. Subspecies pedicellata is only known from near Angourie on the north coast of New South Wales where it grows in coastal or near-coastal sand.
