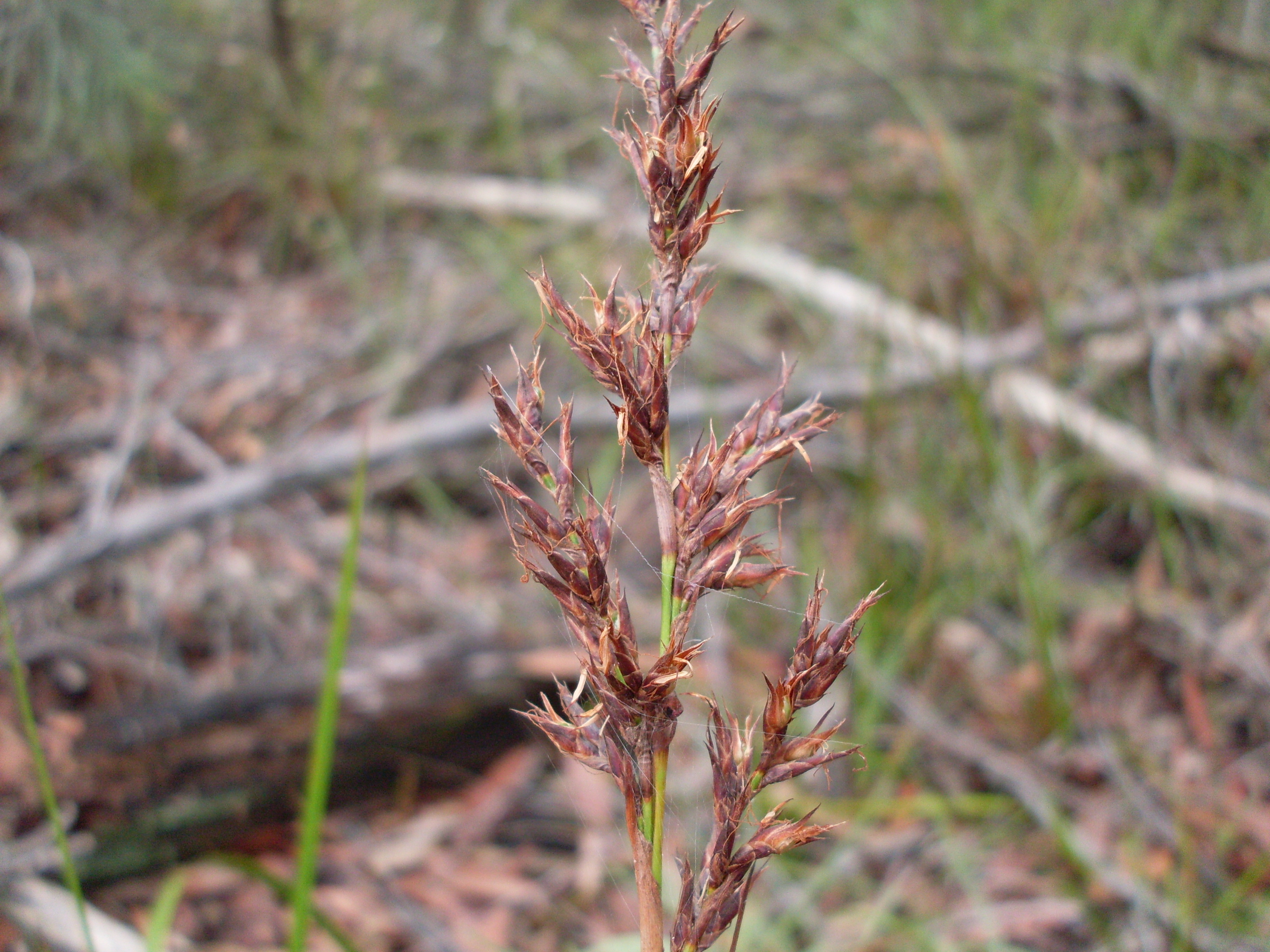

Scientific classification
- Kingdom: Plantae
- Clade: Tracheophytes
- Clade: Angiosperms
- Clade: Monocots
- Clade: Commelinids
- Order: Poales
- Family: Cyperaceae
- Genus: Lepidosperma
- Species: L. concavum

Binomial name
- Lepidosperma concavum R.Br.
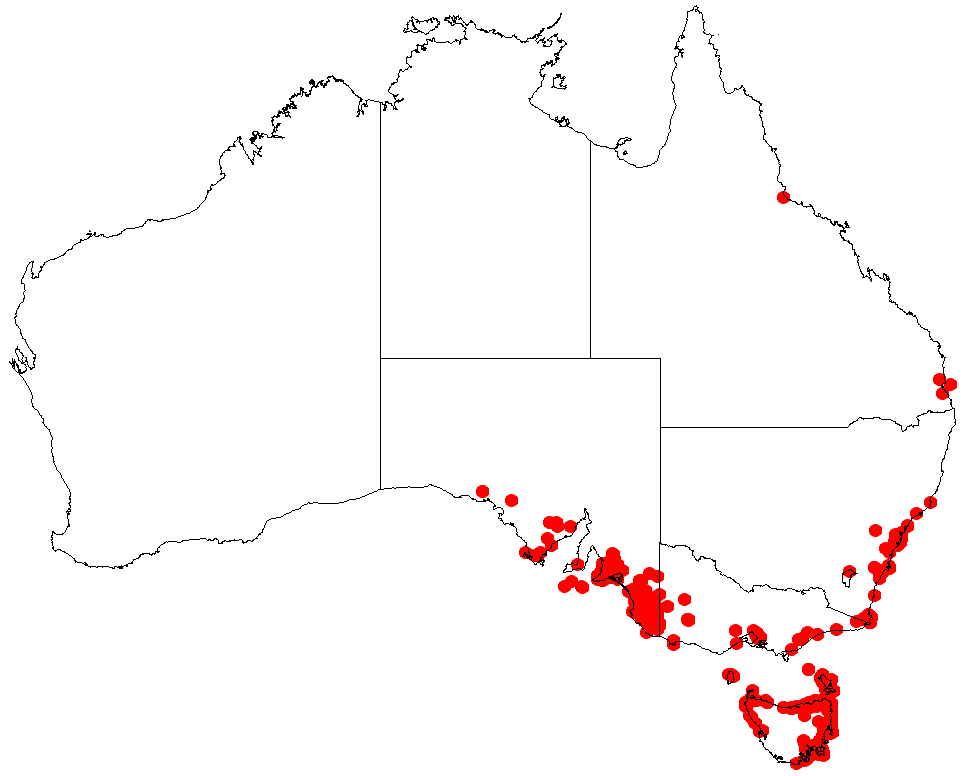
- Occurrence data from AVH

Synonyms
- Schoenus concavum

= Lepidosperma concavum =

Sandhill sword-sedge

Species of plant

Lepidosperma concavum, commonly known as the sandhill sword-sedge, is a plant found in coastal regions of south-eastern and eastern Australia. It grows on sandy soils in woodland, forest and heathland.

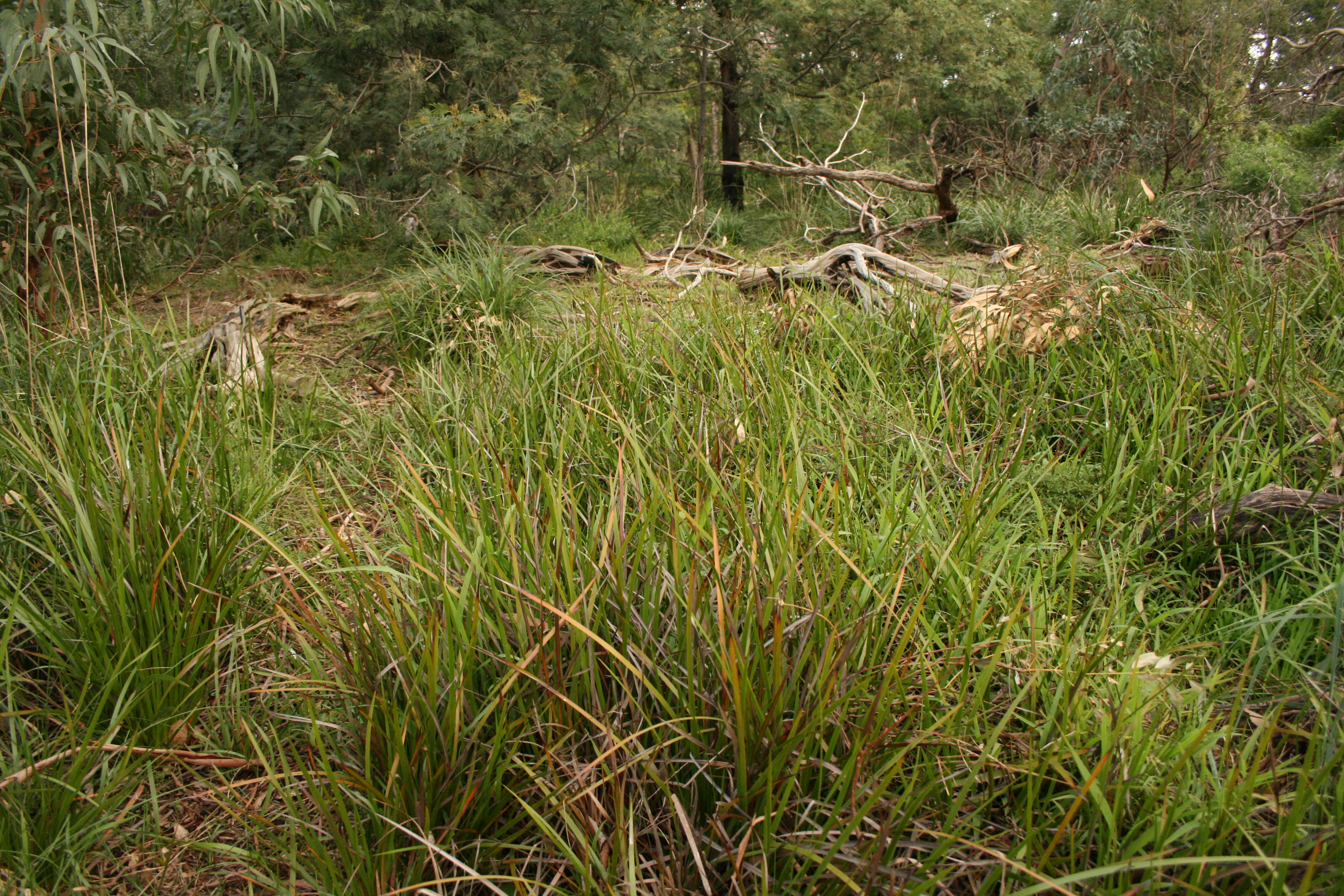
Ground layer of Lepidosperma concavum in heathy woodland

== Description ==
The sandhill sword-sedge is a tufted perennial with a short vertical rhizome and rigid, erect, sharp-edged culms. It grows to 20–60 cm in height and 3–7 mm in width. The inflorescence is erect, dense, ovate to oblong, 3–15 cm long and 2–4 cm in diameter, with a shorter involucral bract. The numerous spikelets are 5–8 mm long, with 6 to 8 bracts, covered in short fine hairs, red-brown to grey-brown. There are 6 scales at the base of stamen, whitish in colour. The smooth, pale to dark brown, ovoid nut is 2.7–4.0 mm long and 1.3–1.8 mm in diameter. It flowers in spring and summer.
