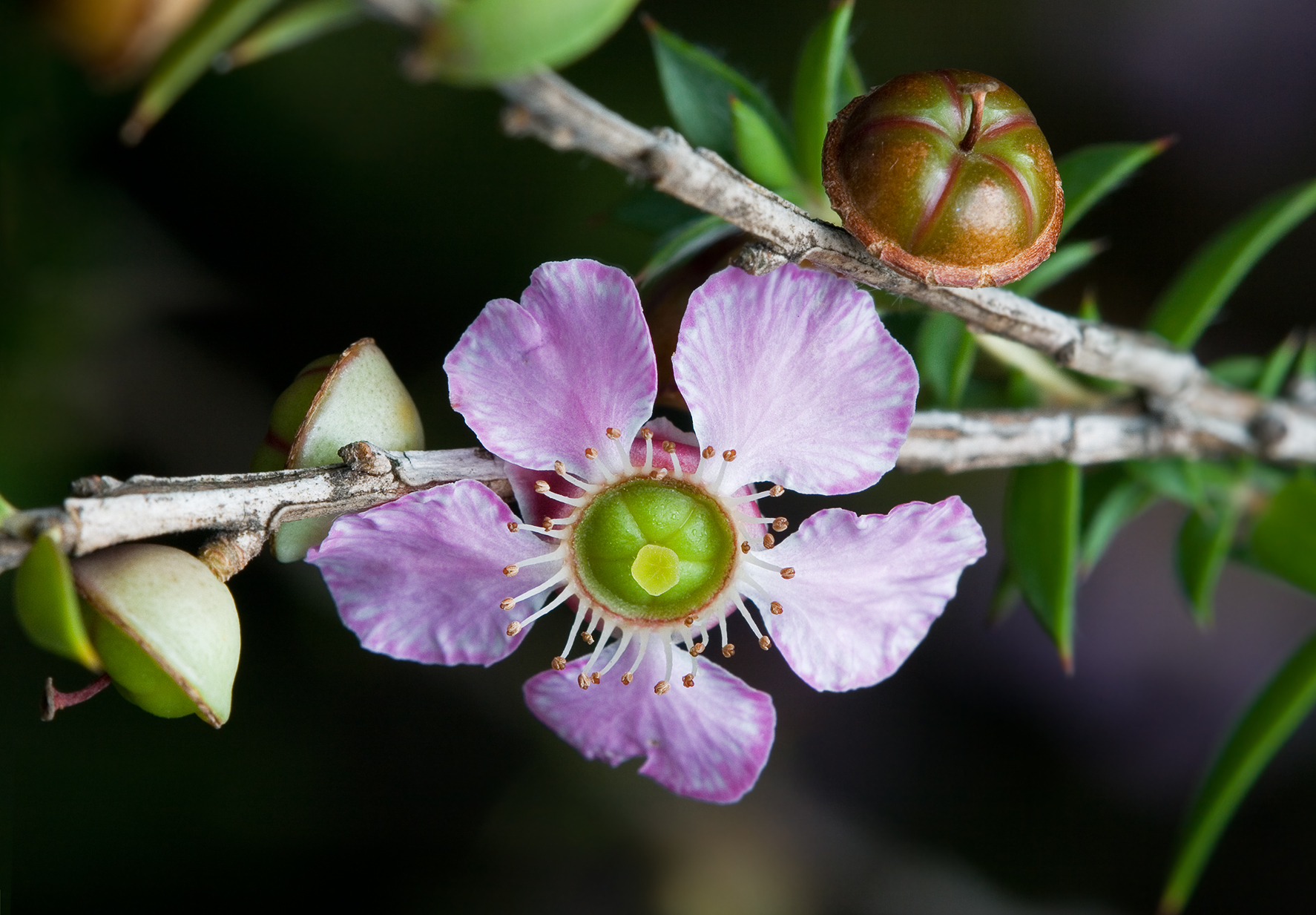
- Flower

Scientific classification
- Kingdom: Plantae
- Clade: Tracheophytes
- Clade: Angiosperms
- Clade: Eudicots
- Clade: Rosids
- Order: Myrtales
- Family: Myrtaceae
- Genus: Leptospermum
- Species: L. squarrosum

Binomial name
- Leptospermum squarrosum Gaertn.

Synonyms
- Leptospermum baccatum var. roseum S.Schauer; Leptospermum persiciflorum Rchb.; Leptospermum scoparium var. grandiflorum Hook.; Leptospermum scoparium var. squarrosum (Gaertn.) Dum.Cours.; Leptospermum scoparium var. vulgare Domin nom. illeg.; Philadelphus squarrosus Sol. ex Gaertn. nom. inval., pro syn.

= Leptospermum squarrosum =

Peach blossom tea-tree

Species of shrub

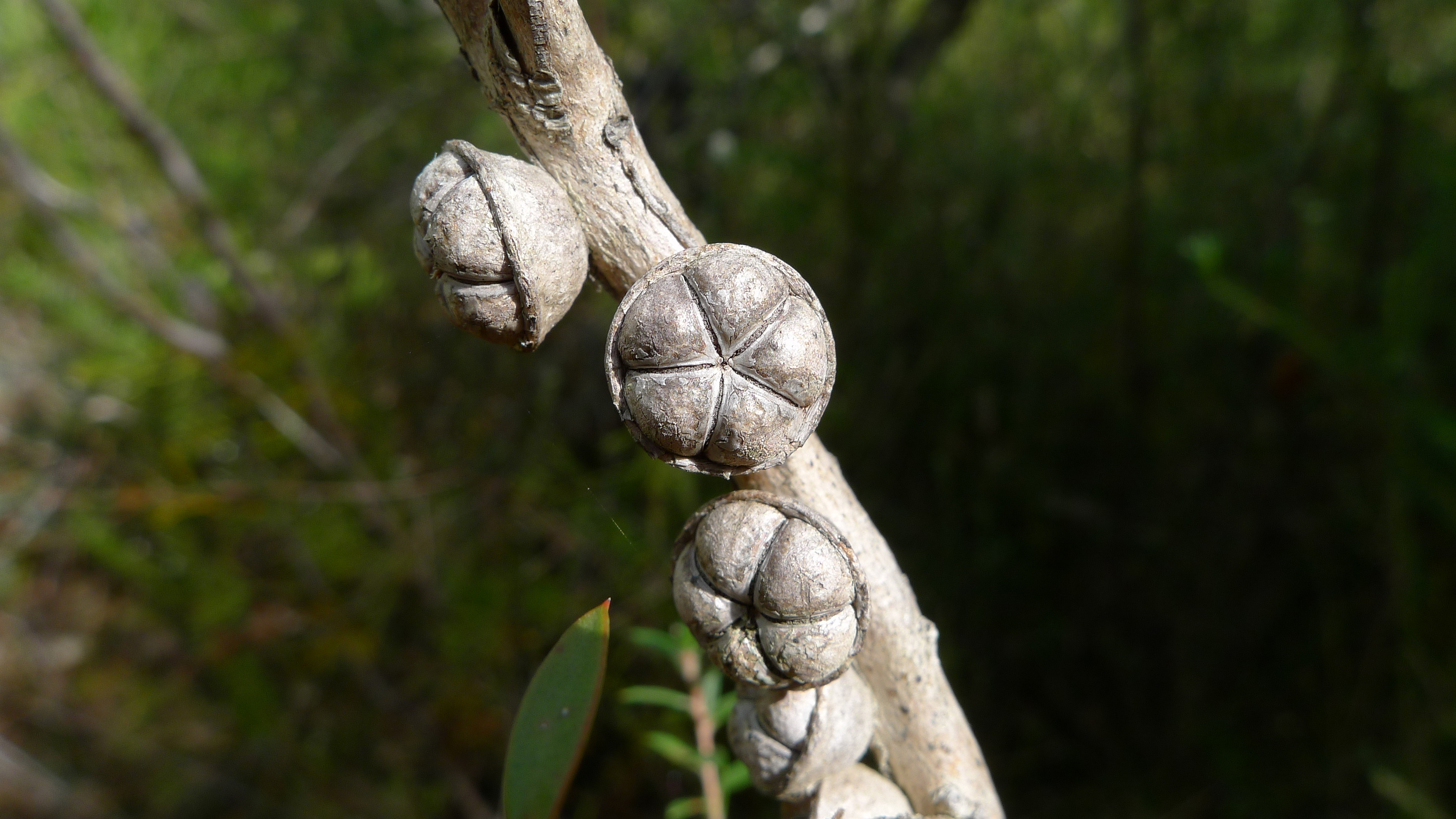
Fruit

Leptospermum squarrosum, commonly known as the peach blossom tea-tree, is an upright shrub of the family Myrtaceae and is endemic to central eastern New South Wales. It has thin, firm bark, broadly lance-shaped to elliptical leaves, relatively large white or pink flowers and fruit that remain on the plant when mature.

== Description ==
Leptospermum squarrosum is an erect shrub of variable habit, growing to a height of less than 1 m (3 ft 3 in) to 4 m (13 ft) or more and has thin, firm bark. Young stem are silky-hairy at first, soon glabrous. The leaves are variable but mostly broadly lance-shaped to elliptical, 5–15 mm (0.20–0.59 in) long and 2–5 mm (0.079–0.197 in) wide with a sharply-pointed tip and tapering to a short petiole. The flowers are white or pink, mostly 10–20 mm (0.39–0.79 in) wide and arranged singly on short side shoots. The floral cup is sessile, 2.5–4 mm (0.098–0.157 in) long and glabrous. The sepals are also glabrous, 2–3 mm (0.079–0.118 in) long, the five petals 3–7 mm (0.12–0.28 in) long and the stamens 3–4 mm (0.12–0.16 in) long. Flowering mostly occurs from March to April and the fruit is a capsule mostly 8–12 mm (0.31–0.47 in) wide that remain on the plant at maturity.

== Taxonomy ==
Leptospermum squarrosum was first formally described in 1788 by Joseph Gaertner in his book De Fructibus et Seminibus Plantarum from specimens collected by Joseph Banks.

== Distribution and habitat ==
Peach blossom tea-tree grows in shrubland on sandstone soils in coastal areas and nearby tablelands of New South Wales, but especially in the Sydney region.

== Use in horticulture ==
This tea-tree is a hardy shrub that grows best in a sunny situation in well-drained soil, but is salt-resistant and tolerates exposed positions.
