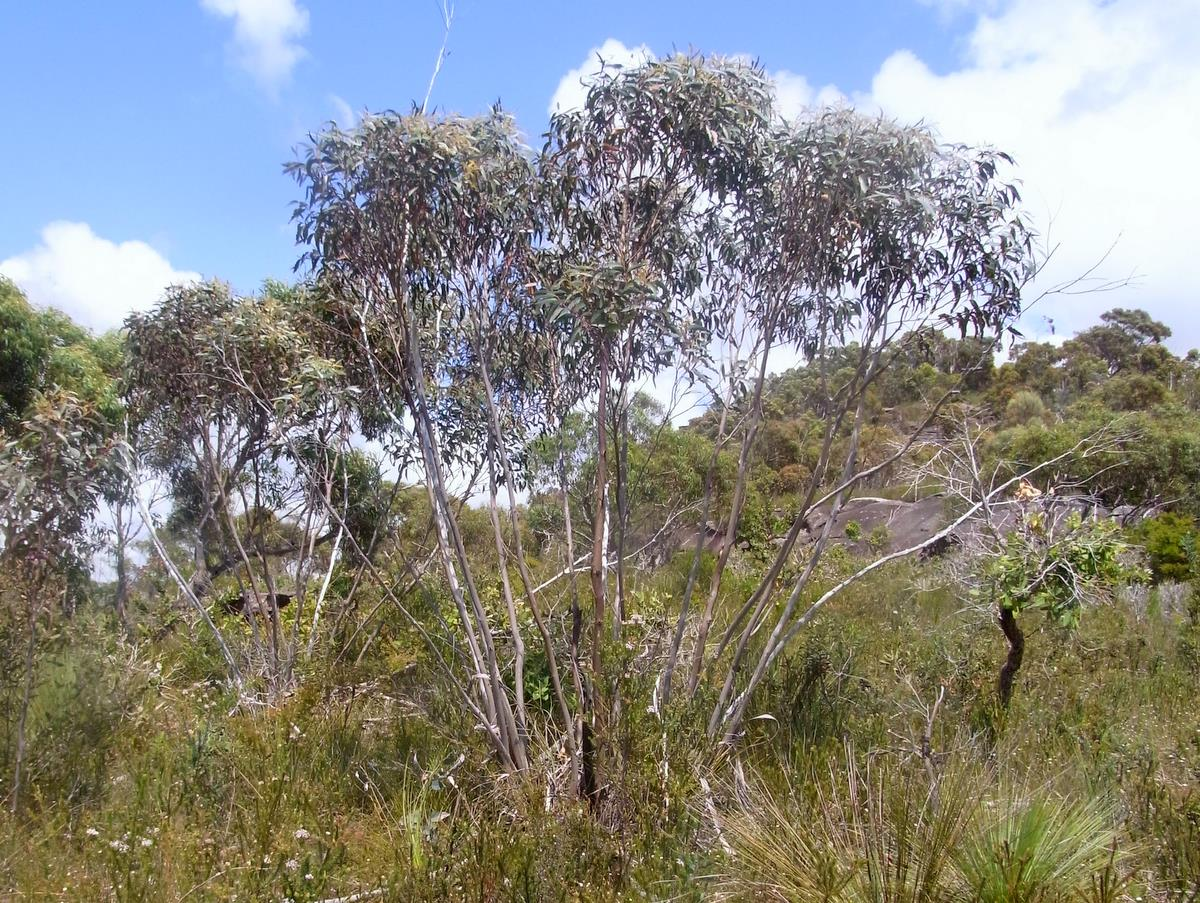
- mallee at Ku-ring-gai Chase National Park, New South Wales

Scientific classification
- Kingdom: Plantae
- Clade: Tracheophytes
- Clade: Angiosperms
- Clade: Eudicots
- Clade: Rosids
- Order: Myrtales
- Family: Myrtaceae
- Genus: Eucalyptus
- Species: E. obstans

Binomial name
- Eucalyptus obstans L.A.S.Johnson & K.D.Hill

= Eucalyptus obstans =

Port Jackson mallee

Species of eucalyptus

Eucalyptus obstans, commonly known as the Port Jackson mallee, is a common eucalyptus of south eastern Australia. It grows as a multi-stemmed mallee reaching 4 metres in height.

The bark is smooth, grey or greenish. It grows on poor shallow sandstone soils from Ku-ring-gai Chase National Park to Jervis Bay.

Eucalyptus obstans was first formally described in 1991 by Lawrie Johnson and Ken Hill in the journal Telopea, but the Australian Plant Census considers E. obstans to be a synonym of E. burgessiana.
