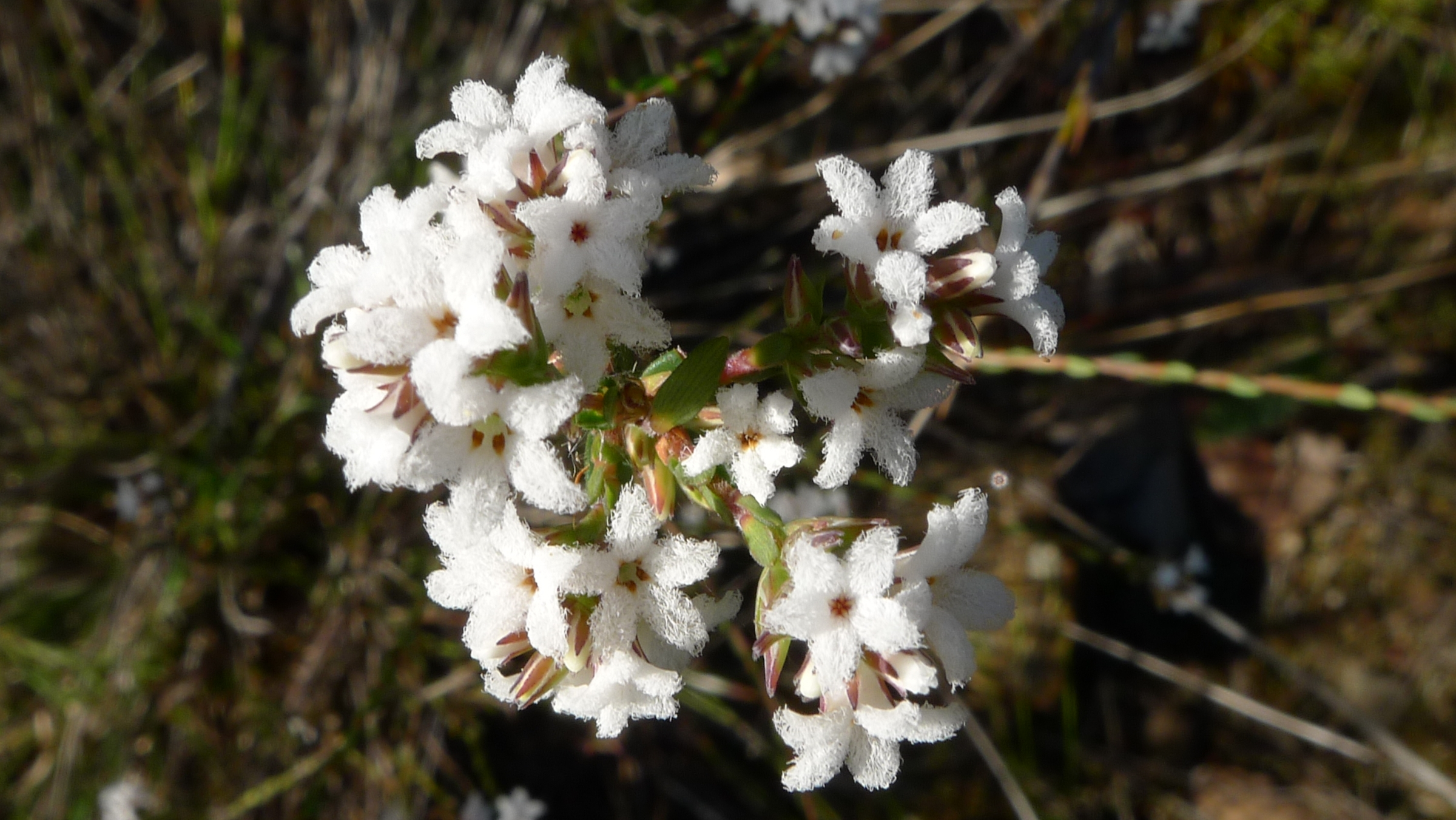

Scientific classification
- Kingdom: Plantae
- Clade: Tracheophytes
- Clade: Angiosperms
- Clade: Eudicots
- Clade: Asterids
- Order: Ericales
- Family: Ericaceae
- Genus: Leucopogon
- Species: L. microphyllus

Binomial name
- Leucopogon microphyllus (Cav.) R.Br.
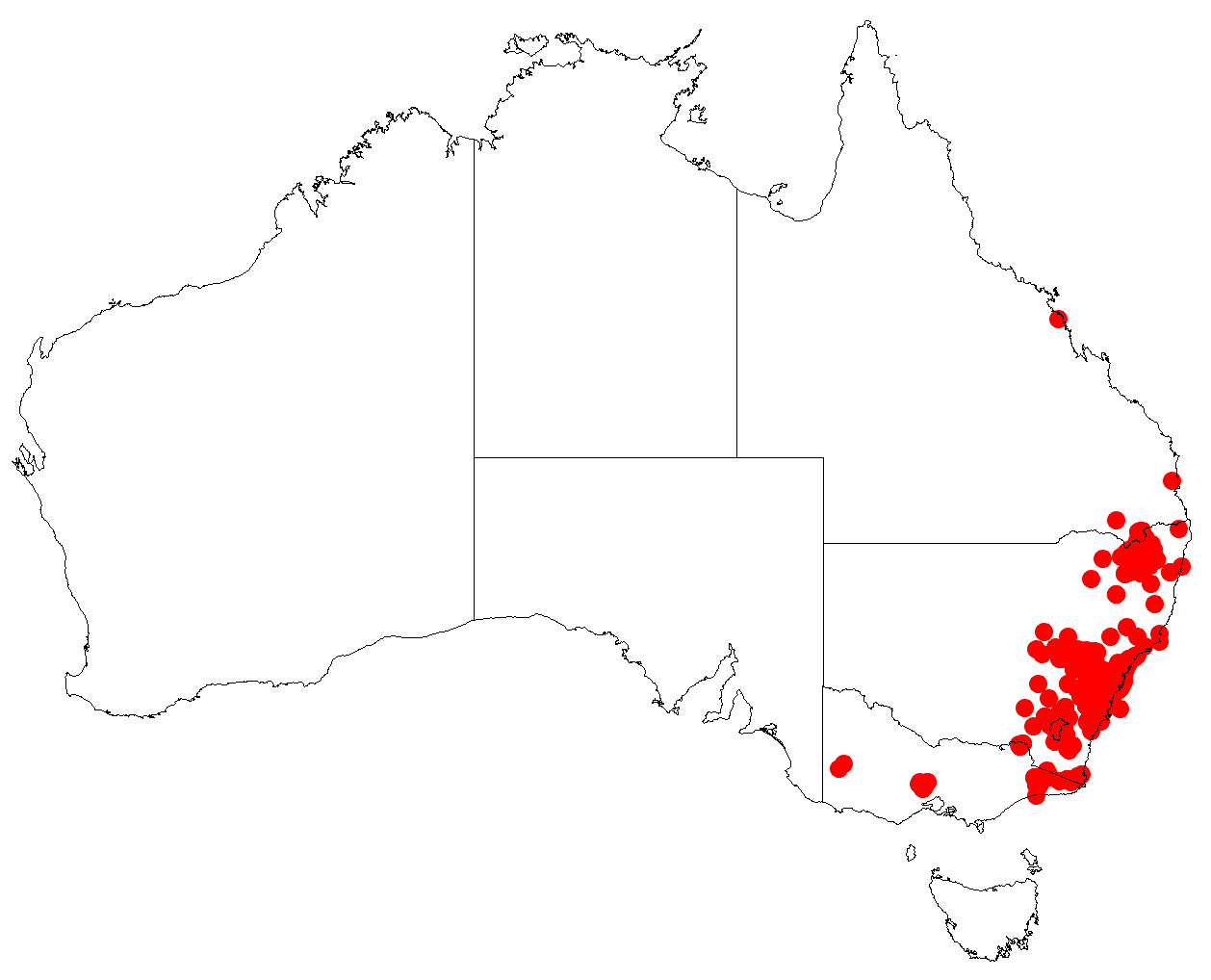
- Occurrence data from AVH

Synonyms
- Leucopogon denudatus (Spreng.) Sieber ex DC.; Leucopogon fraternus DC.; Peroa microphylla Pers. orth. var.; Perojoa microphylla Cav.; Styphelia denudata Spreng.; Styphelia microphylla (Cav.) Spreng.; Styphelia microphylla (Cav.) F.Muell. isonym

= Leucopogon microphyllus =

Species of flowering plant

Leucopogon microphyllus is a species of flowering plant in the heath family Ericaceae and is endemic to eastern Australia. It is a bushy or spreading shrub with egg-shaped leaves, sometimes with the narrower end towards the base, and compact spikes of usually four to nine white, tube-shaped flowers.

== Description ==
Leucopogon microphyllus is a bushy or spreading shrub that typically grows to a height of up to 1 m (3 ft 3 in), its branchlets with fine, bristly hairs. The leaves are egg-shaped leaves, sometimes with the narrower end towards the base, 2.2–7.3 mm (0.087–0.287 in) long and 1.4–2.5 mm (0.055–0.098 in) wide on a petiole up to 0.5 mm (0.020 in) long. The leaves are more or less glabrous, the upper surface convex and the lower surface with more or less parallel veins. The flowers are arranged in erect spikes of mostly four to nine 5–11 mm (0.20–0.43 in) long with bracteoles 1.3–1.8 mm (0.051–0.071 in) long at the base. The sepals are 2.3–2.7 mm (0.091–0.106 in) long, the petals white and joined at the base to form a tube 1.1–1.8 mm (0.043–0.071 in) long with lobes 1.5–2.6 mm (0.059–0.102 in) long and softly-hairy inside. Flowering occurs in most months but mainly from August to October, and the fruit is an oblong drupe 1.2–1.5 mm (0.047–0.059 in) long.

== Taxonomy ==
This species was first formally described in 1797 by Antonio José Cavanilles who gave it the name Perojoa microphylla in his Icones et Descriptiones Plantarum. In 1810, Robert Brown transferred the species to Leucopogon as L. microphyllus in his Prodromus Florae Novae Hollandiae et Insulae Van Diemen. The specific epithet (microphyllus) means "small-leaved".

In 1868, George Bentham reduced Leucopogon pilibundus A.Cunn. ex DC. to Leucopogon microphyllus var. pilibundus in Flora Australiensis, and the new name, and that of the autonym are accepted by the Australian Plant Census:

- Leucopogon microphyllus (Cav.) R.Br. var. microphyllus has glabrous leaves, bracteoles and sepals, the petal lobes only slightly longer than the petal tube.
- Leucopogon microphyllus var. pilibundus (A.Cunn. ex DC.) Benth. has short to long hairs on the leaves, bracteoles and sepals, the petal lobes up to twice as long as the petal tube.

== Distribution and habitat ==
The autonym (var. microphyllus) grows in heath and forest on ridges and hillsides, and is widespread on the coasts and tablelands of New South Wales and the Australian Capital Territory, extending into south-eastern Queensland. It is found at sea level to altitudes of up to 1,200 m (3,900 ft). The variety pilibundus grows in open forest and woodland on ridges and on rocky creek banks on near-coastal areas and tablelands of New South Wales, the Australian Capital Territory and north-eastern Victoria, with a disjunct population near Lerderderg Gorge. It grows at altitudes of 800–1,200 m (2,600–3,900 ft).
