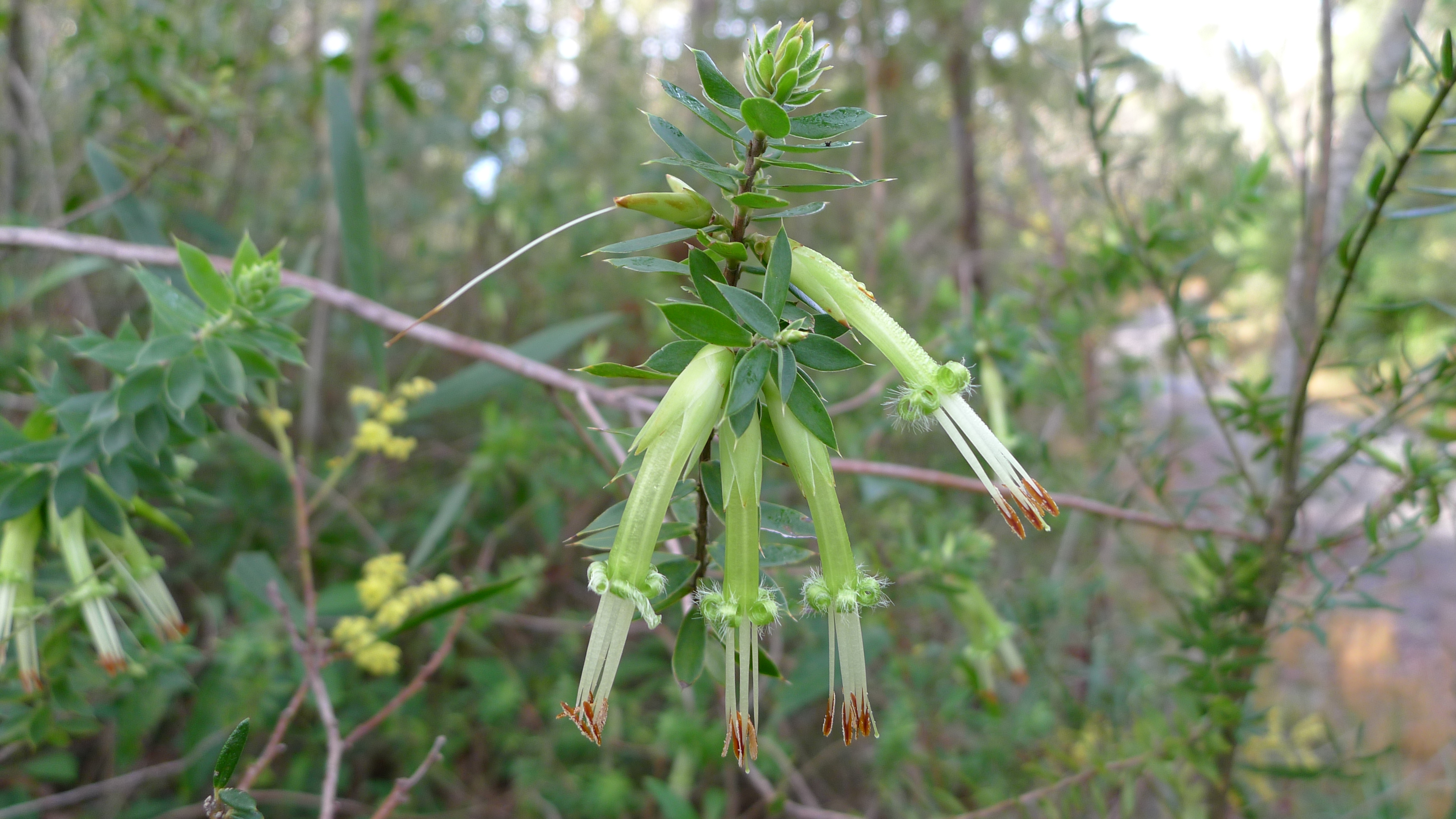
- Styphelia viridis at Waterfall

Scientific classification
- Kingdom: Plantae
- Clade: Tracheophytes
- Clade: Angiosperms
- Clade: Eudicots
- Clade: Asterids
- Order: Ericales
- Family: Ericaceae
- Genus: Styphelia
- Species: S. tubiflora

Binomial name
- Styphelia tubiflora Andrews

= Styphelia viridis =

Green five corners

Species of flowering plant

Styphelia viridis, commonly called green five corners, is a plant in the family Ericaceae and is endemic to the east coast of Australia. It owes its common name to the appearance of its fruit - a drupe with a flat top and five distinct ribs, and to the colour of its flowers. The flowers appear in autumn and winter and are a source of food for honeyeaters.

In describing this species, Henry Cranke Andrews noted: "Few of the plants from New Holland have excited more admiration than the Styphelias....our present plant, together with the other species already known from dried specimens, lead us to conjecture that the genus is as copious as any, Banksias not excepted, from that country."

== Description ==
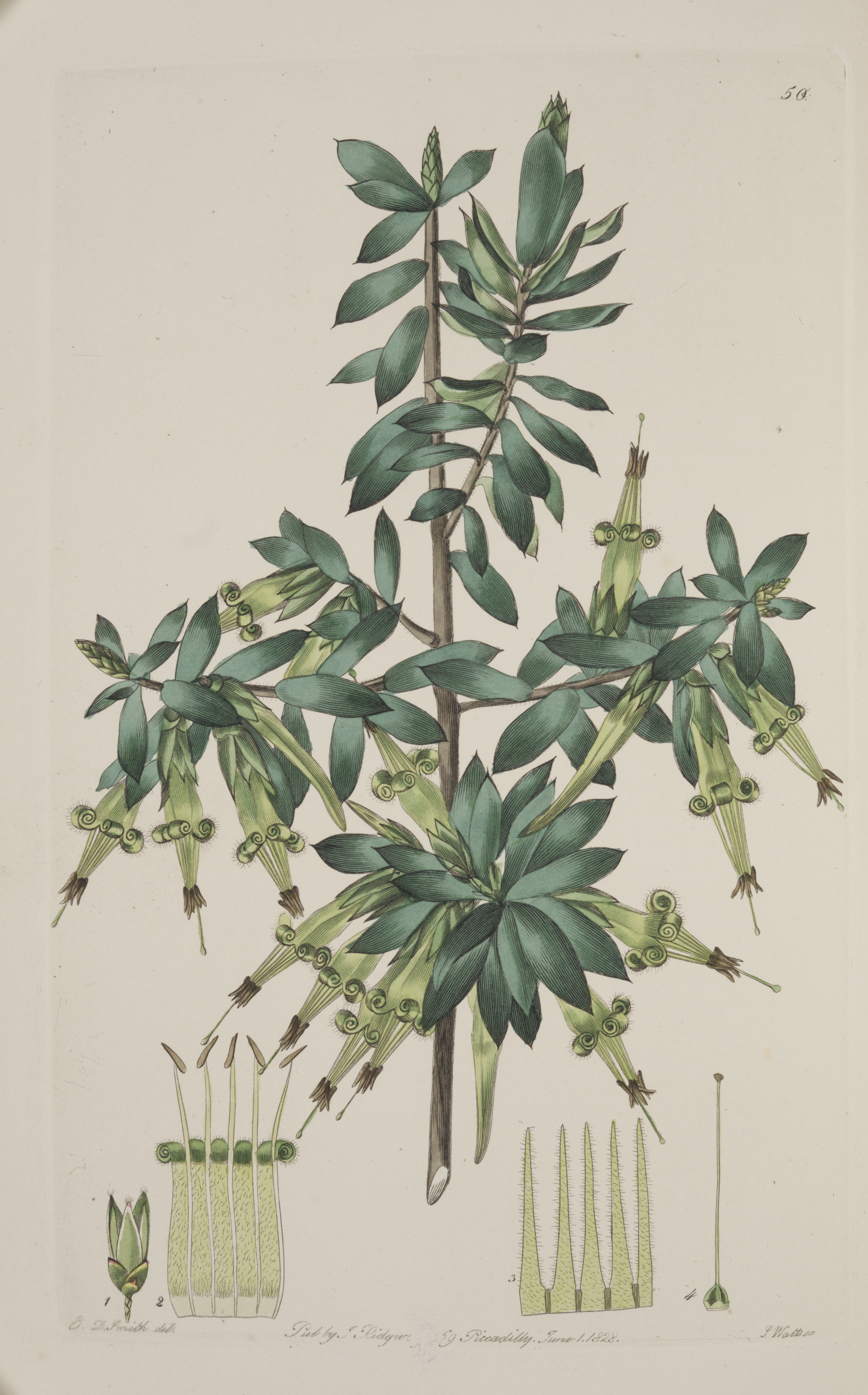
Styphelia viridis illustration from Robert Sweet's Flora Australasica (1828)

Styphelia viridis is an erect or straggly, small shrub growing to a height of no more than 1.8 metres (6 ft) and usually much less. The branchlets are stiff and covered with very fine, white hairs. The leaves are similar to those of other styphelias, 12–29 millimetres (0.5–1 in) long, 2.9–7.6 millimetres (0.1–0.3 in) wide and lance shaped, tapering to a fine point. The stalk of the leaf is 1–2 millimetres (0.04–0.08 in) long and the blade of the leaf is flat and glabrous with parallel veins.

The flowers are a translucent bottle-green. The sepals are green, 8.5–16 millimetres (0.3–0.6 in) long and glabrous. The petals are fused into a tube 14–23 millimetres (0.6–0.9 in) long with the ends of the petals rolled back, exposing the hairy inner surface of the tube. The filaments of the stamens and the style extend well beyond the tube, both about 10–16 millimetres (0.4–0.6 in) long. The anthers are brown and a further 3.2–6.3 millimetres (0.1–0.2 in) long. Flowering occurs from April to August and is followed by the fruit which is a flat-topped, five-sided greenish-red drupe.

== Taxonomy and naming ==
Styphelia viridis was first described in 1803 by Henry Cranke Andrews in The Botanist's Repository for New, and Rare Plants. The specific epithet (viridis) is a Latin word meaning "green" referring to the colour of the flowers.

There are two subspecies recognised:

- Styphelia viridis Andrews subsp. viridis occurs between Seal Rocks and Botany Bay in New South Wales and is distinguished by having shorter (4.8–6.8 millimetres (0.2–0.3 in)) anthers as well as other minor differences;
- Styphelia viridis subsp. breviflora (Benth.) J.M.Powell occurs from Red Rock north to southern Queensland and is distinguished from the other subspecies by having somewhat longer anthers (3.2–4.5 millimetres (0.1–0.2 in)).

== Distribution and habitat ==
Styphelia viridis occurs on the coast and ranges of New South Wales and southern Queensland growing in heath and dry sclerophyll forest on sandy soils.

== Uses ==
=== Horticulture ===
This species is not well known in cultivation. It can be grown from seed or cuttings. It requires a semi-shaded position, well drained soil and adequate watering.
