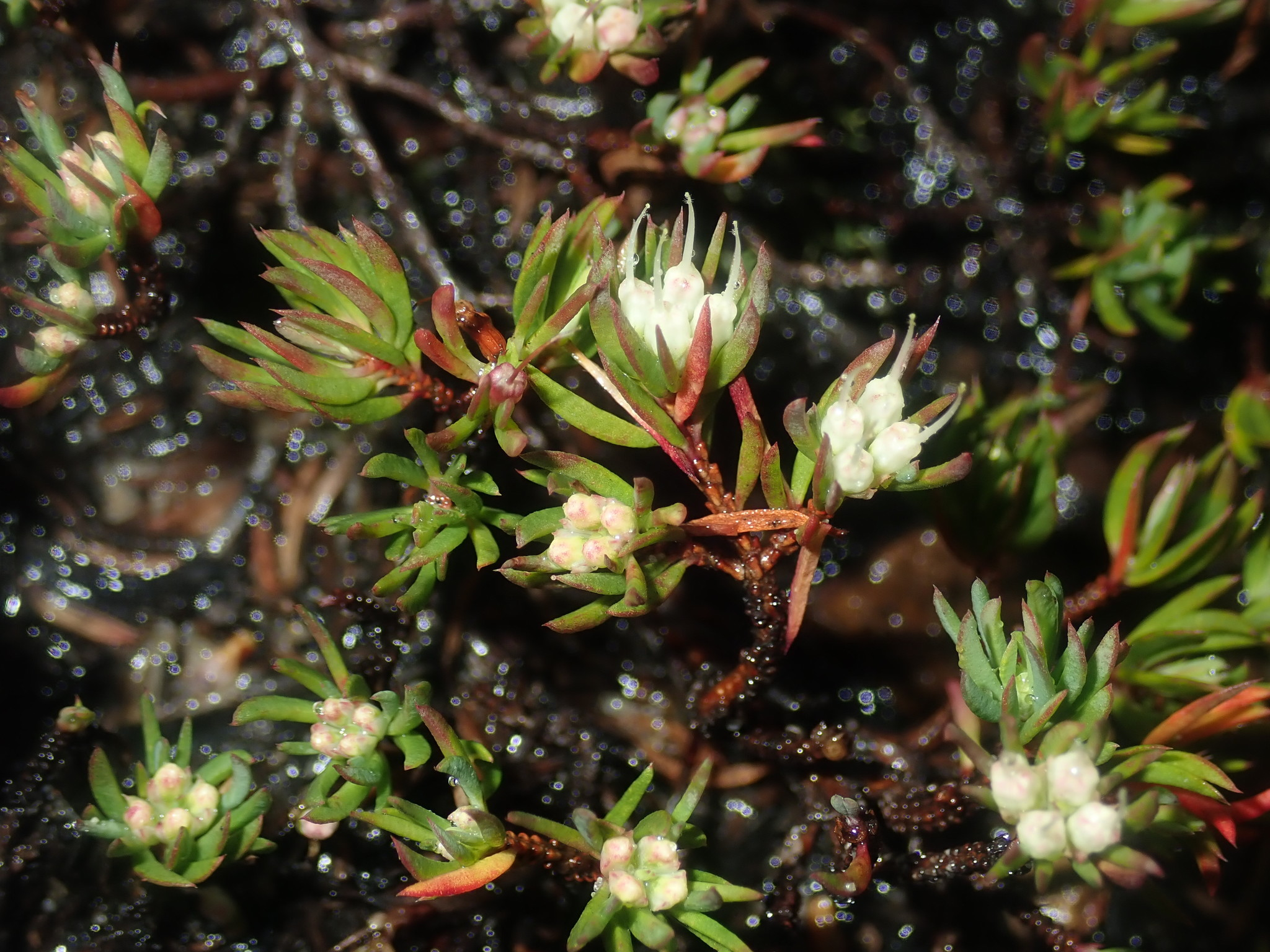

Scientific classification
- Kingdom: Plantae
- Clade: Embryophytes
- Clade: Tracheophytes
- Clade: Spermatophytes
- Clade: Angiosperms
- Clade: Eudicots
- Clade: Rosids
- Order: Myrtales
- Family: Myrtaceae
- Genus: Darwinia
- Species: D. diminuta

Binomial name
- Darwinia diminuta B.G.Briggs
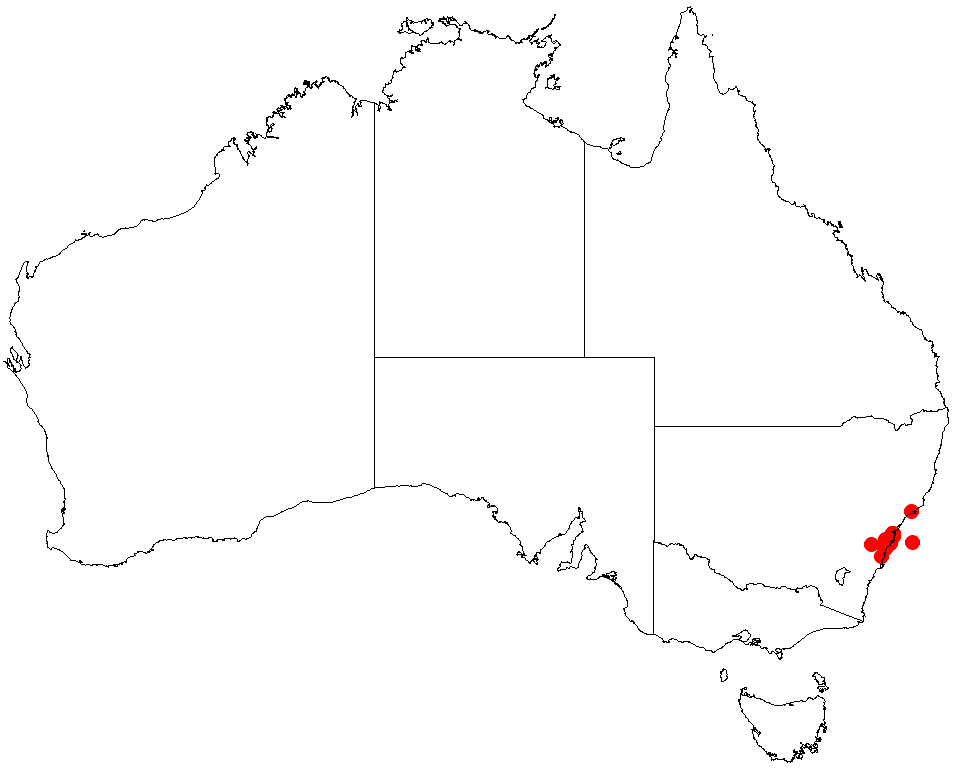
- Occurrence data from AVH

= Darwinia diminuta =

Species of flowering plant

Darwinia diminuta is a plant in the myrtle family Myrtaceae and is endemic to New South Wales. A small spreading shrub with white to pinkish tubular flowers arranged in pairs, with a restricted distribution mostly in the Sydney region.

== Description ==
Darwinia diminuta is a shrub that has an erect and spreading habit with ascending branches, typically growing to a height of 1.5 metres (5 ft). It has decussate leaves triangular in cross-section and 6 to 11 millimetres (0.24 to 0.43 in) long and 0.5–1 mm (0.020–0.039 in) wide. The flower tubes are arranged in pairs 2-4 per cluster, 3–5 mm (0.12–0.20 in) long, on a stem 0.5 mm (0.020 in) long. Flowers have five white to pink curved petals with prominent ribbing each 0.8–1.2 mm (0.031–0.047 in) long. The bracts are leaf-like and 3–10 mm (0.12–0.39 in) long. The smaller yellow-green bracts surrounding the flowers are oblong shaped about 3–5 mm (0.12–0.20 in) long, falling off when the flower opens. The sepals are triangular shaped and narrow about 1.5 mm (0.059 in) long, mostly toothed and sometimes longer than the petals. The white style is 4–9 mm (0.16–0.35 in) long. Flowers from spring to early summer.

== Distribution and habitat ==
A rare species found in heathlands or dry sclerophyll forest in eastern New South Wales between Manly, Ingleside, Loftus and Helensburgh where it grows in poorly drained sandy soils.

== Taxonomy and naming ==
Darwinia diminuta was first formally described by Barbara Briggs in 1962 and published in Contributions from the New South Wales National Herbarium. The species name diminuta means "diminutive" and refers to the small size of the flower.
