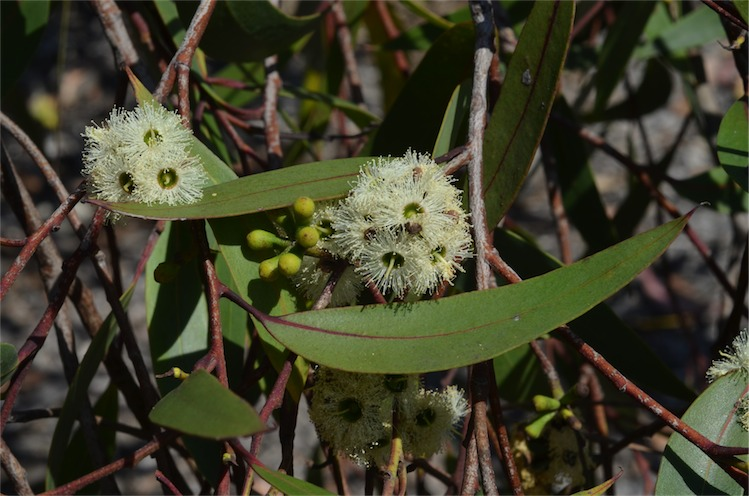
- Eucalyptus burgessiana in the Australian Botanic Garden Mount Annan

Conservation status
- Least Concern (IUCN 3.1)

Scientific classification
- Kingdom: Plantae
- Clade: Embryophytes
- Clade: Tracheophytes
- Clade: Spermatophytes
- Clade: Angiosperms
- Clade: Eudicots
- Clade: Rosids
- Order: Myrtales
- Family: Myrtaceae
- Genus: Eucalyptus
- Species: E. burgessiana

Binomial name
- Eucalyptus burgessiana L.A.S.Johnson & Blaxell

Synonyms
- Eucalyptus obstans L.A.S.Johnson & K.D.Hill; Eucalyptus obtusiflora auct. non DC. Bentham; Eucalyptus obtusiflora auct. non DC. Chippend.; Eucalyptus virgata var. obtusiflora auct. non (DC.) Maiden

= Eucalyptus burgessiana =

Faulconbridge mallee ash

Species of eucalyptus

Eucalyptus burgessiana, commonly known as the Faulconbridge mallee ash, is a small tree or mallee that is endemic to New South Wales. It has smooth bark, narrow lance-shaped or curved adult leaves, flower buds arranged in groups of between seven and eleven, white flowers and barrel-shaped or cup-shaped flowers.

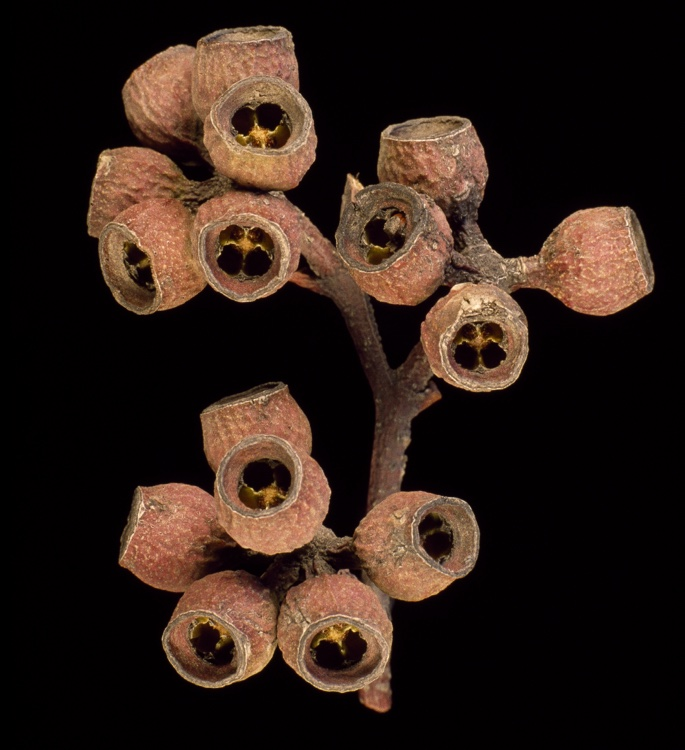
Fruit

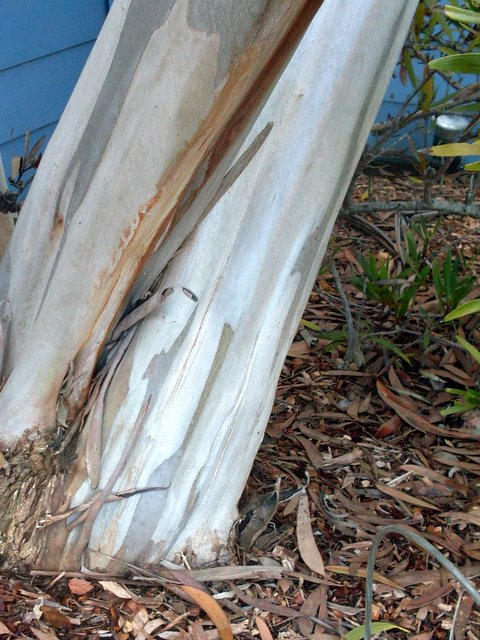
Bark

== Description ==
Eucalyptus burgessiana is a mallee or a small tree that typically grows to 7 metres (23 ft) and forms a lignotuber. It has smooth grey, pink, orange, pale brown or grey bark. Young plants and coppice regrowth are densely warty on the lower stem and have leaves that are glossy and bright green on both sides. The young leaves are broadly lance-shaped up to 150 mm (5.9 in) long, 50 mm (2 in) wide and have a petiole. Adult leaves are narrow lance-shaped to curved, 70–130 mm (2.8–5.1 in) long and 13–25 mm (0.5–1 in) wide on a petiole 5–20 mm (0.20–0.79 in) long. The flower buds are arranged in groups of seven, nine or eleven on an unbranched peduncle 8–19 mm (0.31–0.75 in) long, the individual flowers on pedicels 2–6 mm (0.079–0.24 in) long. Mature flower buds are oval 7–11 mm (0.28–0.43 in) long and 3–6 mm (0.12–0.24 in) wide with a conical to rounded operculum, sometimes with a small point on the tip. Flowering mainly occurs between August and December and the flowers are white. The fruit is a woody barrel-shaped, cup-shaped or urn-shaped capsule 8–12 mm (0.31–0.47 in) long and wide.

== Taxonomy and naming ==
Eucalyptus burgessiana was first formally described in 1972 by Lawrie Johnson and Donald Blaxell from a specimen in Faulconbridge. The description was published in Contributions from the New South Wales National Herbarium. The specific epithet (burgessiana) honours Colin Burgess (1907–1987) who was knowledgeable about the flora of the Blue Mountains.

== Distribution and habitat ==
Faulconbridge mallee ash grows in mallee shrubland between Springwood, Faulconbridge and Jervis Bay.
