= Malabar Headland =

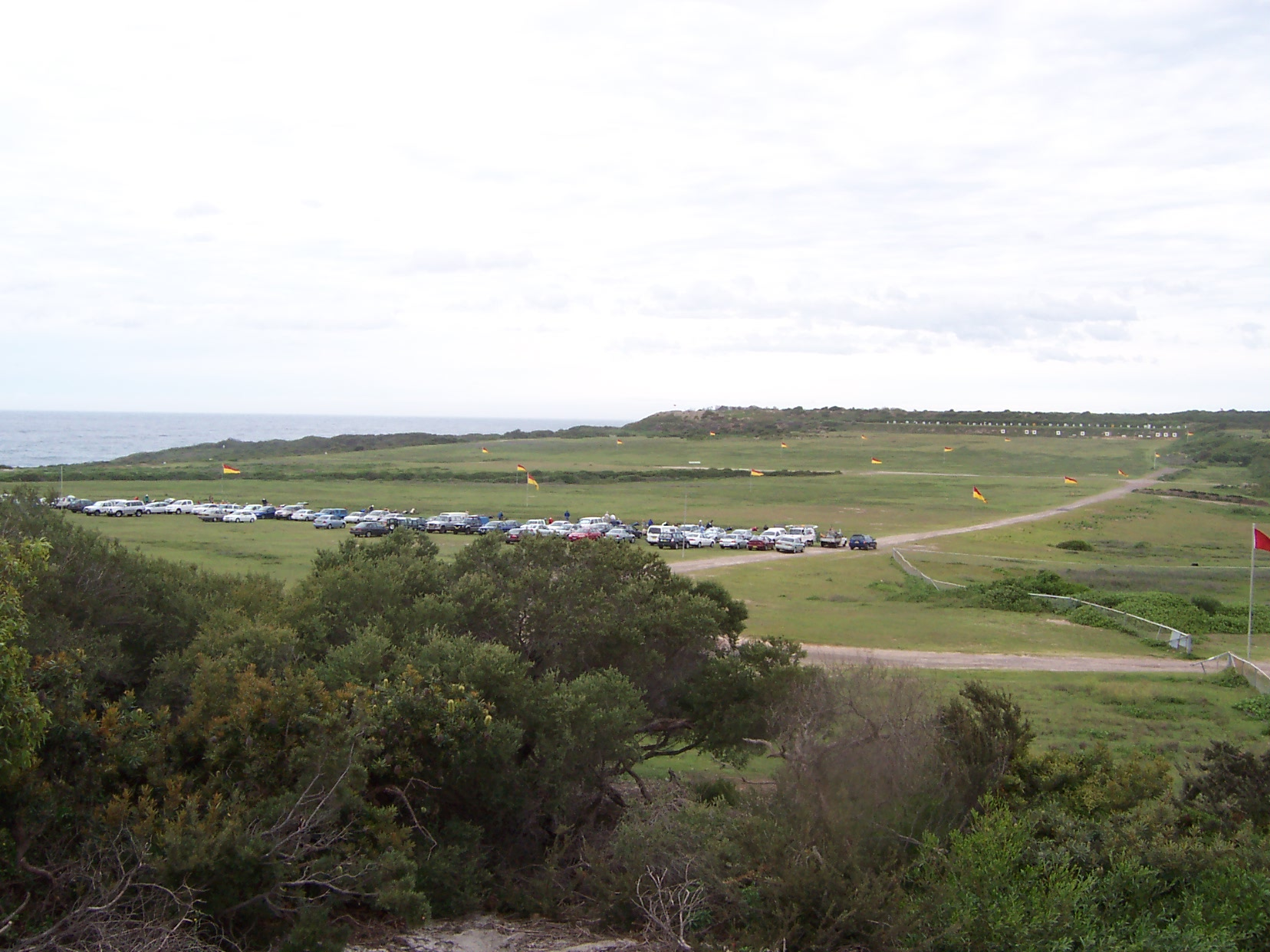
- The full bore rifle range located on the headland, in April 2004.

- Location within Sydney
- 33°57′30″S 151°15′47″E
- Location: Franklin Street, Malabar, City of Randwick, New South Wales, Australia

Site notes
- Owner: New South Wales Government

New South Wales Heritage Register
- Official name: Malabar Headland; Long Bay Rifle Range; Anzac Rifle Range; Boora Point
- Type: State heritage (landscape)
- Designated: 22 July 2005
- Reference no.: 1741
- Type: Historic Landscape
- Category: Landscape – Cultural

The Malabar Headland is a heritage-listed former public recreation area and military installation site and now nature conservation and public recreation headland area located at Franklin Street, Malabar in the City of Randwick local government area of New South Wales, Australia. It is also known as Long Bay Rifle Range, Anzac Rifle Range and Boora Point. The property is owned by the New South Wales Government, which established Malabar Headland National Park in 2012. It was added to the New South Wales State Heritage Register on 22 July 2005.

== Overview ==
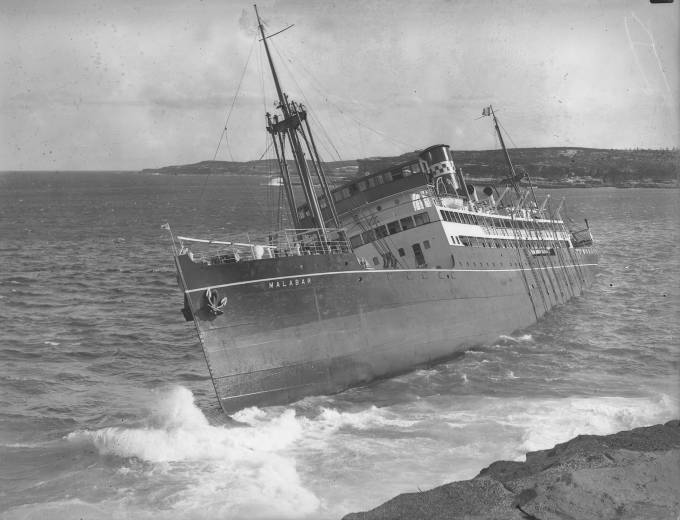
The MV Malabar grounded off Long Bay headland on 2 April 1931 in poor visibility. Visiting the wreck was a popular outing for Sydneysiders.

Malabar is a suburb of Sydney, located 12 kilometres (7.5 mi) south of the Sydney central business district. The suburb is named after a passenger cargo steamer called the MV Malabar shipwrecked at Long Bay on 2 April 1931. The ship was named after the Malabar region of the Indian state of Kerala famous for its history as a spice trade centre. Prior to the shipwreck, the suburb was known as either Brand or Long Bay. The local residents petitioned the government to change the name to avoid the association with the Long Bay Correctional Centre; the new name Malabar was gazetted by the government on 29 September 1933.

There have been several shipwrecks on the Malabar headland – the St Albans in 1882, the Hereward in 1898, the SS Tekapo in 1899, the MV Malabar in 1931, the Belbowrie in 1939, Try One in 1947, the SS Goolgwai in 1955 and a barge in 1955.

The Malabar headland includes dramatic sandstone cliffs and provides spectacular coastal views. The western and eastern sections of the headland contain rare examples of the once extensive Port Jackson mallee scrub (Eucalyptus obstans, formerly Obtusiflora).

The 177-hectare (440-acre) headland was first used by local aboriginal people for fishing and cultural activities. Since European settlement, the headland has been used for dairy farming, recreational shooting, military use as a training facility, and a defensive position during World War II known as the Boora Point Battery.

ANZAC Rifle Range on the headland has been in active use since recreational target shooting first began in the 1850s, and is believed to be the oldest rifle range in Australia. It was previously known as the Long Bay Rifle Range and was renamed ANZAC Rifle Range in 1970 by the Army as a tribute to the rifle club members who served the nation during two World Wars and the Korean Campaign. The range has hosted numerous national and international shooting competitions including the prestigious Empire Matches, the Bicentennial Shooting Championships and the annual NSW Queen's Prize competitions.

The central area of the Malabar headland was used for uncontrolled industrial waste disposal from 1968 to 1988. The Labor Government announced its intention to sell the headland in 1986. The tenders included a proposal from Club Med to build a 300-room resort complex linked to an eighteen-hole golf course on the headland. A legal action brought by the NSW Rifle Association blocked the sale of the headland in 1990. The use of the headland has more recently been shared by a number of recreational organisations including rifle and pistol clubs, horse riding school, model aircraft flying club, bush conservation, bush walking, jogging, bird watching and rock fishing. Discharge of firearms can only occur at an approved target shooting facility. In the greater Sydney metropolitan area there are over 55,000 licensed firearms owners who are required by law to use their equipment two, four, or more times per year. The number of people using the headland exceeded 1,000 per week until the Labor Government terminated the user leases in October 2011 citing questionable health and safety concerns. The Labor Government demolished over $5 million worth of community infrastructure including the Malabar Riding School structures, Army Barrack huts, caretaker's cottage, Smallbore Rifle Range and the Sporting Shooters Association of Australia Bench Rest Rifle Range in October 2012.

== History ==
=== Chronology of the Malabar Headland ===
Major developments include:

- pre-1780s – local Aboriginal people in the area used the site for fishing and cultural activities, in particular it was used as a site of initiation ceremonies. The land was known as Boora to the Aboriginals; rock engravings, grinding grooves and middens were recorded during a 2005 survey but a 2009/2010 survey failed to find the original survey sites.
- 1789 – Governor Arthur Phillip referred to "a long bay", which became known as Long Bay
- 1819 – The land at Long Bay is rented for farming and running stock according to the Government Gazette
- 1820s – Crown grant for "Church and School Lands" of 1,730 hectares (4,300 acres) included the nominated area
- 1842 – The Sydney Rifle Club is formed as the first civilian rifle club in Australia
- 1855 – village reserve set aside at Long Bay
- 1850s – recreational shooting began on the rifle range site
- 1859 – Randwick Municipal Council created, covering the nominated area
- 1861 – Church & School Lands resumed by the Crown and land sales begin
- 1888 – recreational target shooting reported to be in action
- 1898 – the Hereward wrecked on cliff base
- 1899 – the Tokapo wrecked on cliff base
- 1902 – NSW Government reaffirmed public recreation reserves in the nominated area
- 1910 – NSW Government dedicated the whole headland for military purposes
- 1916 – a cliff face ocean outfall for sewerage established south of the nominated area
- 1919 – a permanent rifle range site was surveyed on the site
- 1929 – control of the rifle range was transferred to the Commonwealth
- 1931 – the MV Malabar wrecked near Boora Point, and the name quickly adopted for the local village to distinguish it from Long Bay Gaol
- 1939-1945 – various military installations (c43 in number) built on the site, notably the Boora Point Battery
- 1951 – Cumberland County Plan zoned the nominated area as "special uses"
- 1967 – NSW Rifle Association clubs transferred to the site from Holsworthy
- 1968–1988 – rifle range site used for extensive land fill operations, possibly from nearby industrial sites
- 1970 – name of the area changed to the ANZAC Rifle Range
- 1986 – Commonwealth announced intention to dispose of property, and official military use ceased
- 1980s – the name Malabar Headland began to be used after early natural vegetation surveys began
- 1990s – legal action undertaken by NSW Rifle Association to prevent disposal of the site.

=== Indigenous history ===
Aboriginal people are believed to have inhabited the Sydney region for at least 20,000 years. The population of Aboriginal people between Palm Beach and Botany Bay in 1788 has been estimated to have been 1,500. Those living south of Port Jackson to Botany Bay were the Cadigal people who spoke Dharug, while the local clan name of Maroubra people was "Muru-ora-dial". By the mid nineteenth century the traditional owners of this land had typically either moved inland in search of food and shelter, or had died as the result of European disease or confrontation with British colonisers.

=== European history ===
One of the earliest land grants in this area was made in 1824 to Captain Francis Marsh, who received 4.9 hectares (12 acres) bounded by the present Botany and High Streets, Alison and Belmore Roads. In 1839 William Newcombe acquired the land north-west of the present town hall in Avoca Street.

Randwick takes its name from the town of Randwick, Gloucestershire, England. The name was suggested by Simeon Pearce (1821–86) and his brother James. Simeon was born in the English Randwick and the brothers were responsible for the early development of both Randwick and its neighbour, Coogee. Simeon had come to the colony in 1841 as a 21-year-old surveyor. He built his Blenheim House on the 1.6 hectares (4 acres) he bought from Marsh, and called his property "Randwick". The brothers bought and sold land profitably in the area and elsewhere. Simeon campaigned for construction of a road from the city to Coogee (achieved in 1853) and promoted the incorporation of the suburb. Pearce sought construction of a church modelled on the church of St. John in his birthplace. In 1857 the first St Jude's stood on the site of the present post office, at the corner of the present Alison Road and Avoca Street.

Randwick was slow to progress. The village was isolated from Sydney by swamps and sandhills, and although a horse-drawn omnibus was operated by a man named Grice from the late 1850s, the journey was more a test of nerves than a pleasure jaunt. Wind blew sand over the track, and the bus sometimes became bogged, so that passengers had to get out and push it free. From its early days Randwick had a divided society. The wealthy lived elegantly in large houses built when Pearce promoted Randwick and Coogee as a fashionable area. But the market gardens, orchards and piggeries that continued alongside the large estates were the lot of the working class. Even on the later estates that became racing empires, many jockeys and stablehands lived in huts or even under canvas. An even poorer group were the immigrants who existed on the periphery of Randwick in a place called Irishtown, in the area now known as The Spot, around the junction of St. Paul's Street and Perouse Road. Here families lived in makeshift houses, taking on the most menial tasks in their struggle to survive.

In 1858 when the NSW Government passed the Municipalities Act, enabling formation of municipal districts empowered to collect rates and borrow money to improve their suburb, Randwick was the first suburb to apply for the status of a municipality. It was approved in February 1859, and its first Council was elected in March 1859.

Randwick had been the venue for sporting events, as well as duels and illegal sports, from the early days in the colony's history. Its first racecourse, the Sandy Racecourse or Old Sand Track, had been a hazardous track over hills and gullies since 1860. When a move was made in 1863 by John Tait, to establish Randwick Racecourse, Simeon Pearce was furious, especially when he heard that Tait also intended to move into Byron Lodge. Tait's venture prospered, however and he became the first person in Australia to organise racing as a commercial sport. The racecourse made a big difference to the progress of Randwick. The horse-drawn omnibus gave way to trams that linked the suburb to Sydney and civilisation. Randwick soon became a prosperous and lively place, and it still retains a busy residential, professional and commercial life.

Today, some of the houses have been replaced by home units. Many European migrants have made their homes in the area, along with students and workers at the nearby University of NSW and the Prince of Wales Hospital.

=== Transfer of land from the Commonwealth to New South Wales ===
On 19 January 2016, Federal Minister for the Environment Greg Hunt and NSW Environment Minister Mark Speakman announced the completion of the transfer of ownership of the South-Eastern Malabar Headland (also known as Lot 304) from the Commonwealth to the people of New South Wales. "We have quadrupled the size of land on the Malabar Headland that will be owned by the people of New South Wales," Minister Hunt said. 'The South-Eastern Headland is the most beautiful and scenic part of the Malabar Headland with panoramic coastal views rivalling any other section of Sydney's stunning coastline. We have fully funded a $5 million upgrade to the Central Malabar Headland, confirmed in the recent release of the 2015-16 Mid-Year Economic Fiscal Outlook. This includes funding to return the South East Equestrian Club to the Headland. The necessary remediation and constructions works are expected to be commence shortly. Funding will also be used to improve safety and other amenities on the ANZAC Rifle Range, as well as completing a scoping study to investigate alternative sites for a mutually agreeable relocation of the New South Wales Rifle Association. We are committed to ensuring the whole of the Malabar Headland is kept in public hands in perpetuity,' Minister Hunt said.

Minister Speakman said the transfer was a win for the local environment with the South-Eastern Headland home to some of the last remnants of the threatened Eastern Suburbs Banksia Scrub and a surviving coastal battery from the defence of Sydney during World War II. "On behalf of the people of New South Wales, I am delighted to welcome back this portion of the Headland after nearly a hundred years of Commonwealth ownership," Minister Speakman said. "We will now work hard to gazette the area as a National Park and to enable safe and significant public access," Minister Speakman said.

70 hectares (170 acres) of Malabar Headland (its eastern side) were declared a national park by the state government. The eastern section of the national park was officially opened in March 2017.

== Description ==
Malabar Headland consists of two sections of bushland: an eastern coastal section of approximately 54 hectares (130 acres) on the peninsula seaward edge and a smaller western section of approximately 17 hectares (42 acres) located approximately 1 kilometre (0.62 mi) inland. Both sections contain remnant coastal vegetation communities of Eastern Suburbs Banksia Scrub growing on Pleistocene sand. The vegetation on the eastern edge of the peninsula ranges from low open scrub of less than 1m high on exposed rock to tall open scrub of up to three metres (nine point eight feet) in height in more sheltered situations. The predominant large scrub species are heath banksia (Banksia ericifolia), coast tea tree (Leptospermum laevigatum), scrub she oak (Allocasuarina distyla), Melaleuca armillaris and wallum banksia (Banksia aemula). On exposed cliff edges the vegetation is low scrub of coast rosemary (Westringia fruticosa) and spiny headed mat rush (Lomandra longifolia). In areas of impeded drainage dagger hakea (Hakea teretifolia) and bottlebrush (Callistemon linearis) occur with a ground cover of sedges. The western section contains heath and scrub communities ranging from less than one metre to 3–4 metres (9.8–13.1 ft) in height. The main shrubs are heath banksia, M.Armillaris and tick bush (Kunzea ambigua). More sheltered sites in the north-east gully support a low woodland dominated by red bloodwood (Corymbia gummifera). The high diversity of plant species found in this section of the Long Bay area is the result of the combination of sand sheet and sandstone soils which occur here. The vegetation communities of the Long Bay area provide a habitat for small mammals, reptiles and birds. Although no detailed faunal surveys have been carried out in the area, field observations have noted a diverse bird and small reptile fauna.

On Boora Point are the remains of a coastal defence establishment constructed in 1943. There are remains of concrete walls of two gun emplacements with associated rooms and tramway tunnels, northern and southern searchlight blockhouses and engine rooms, a battery observation post and associated barracks and toilet blocks. There is a rare example of 15-centimetre (6 in) Mark XII gun mountings. There are remnants and sites of many other structures and a sandstone lined cutting of a tramway. Graffiti dating from World War II can be seen. A large wind generator, erected in 1987 by the Department of Minerals and Energy as experimental apparatus, was removed in July 2000. Relics of the south-west ocean outfall sewer exist in the area. Department of Environment and Heritage.

=== Condition ===
As at 8 December 2004, the vegetation is in good condition. The NSW Scientific Committee has stated that the threats to the survival of Eastern Suburbs Banksia Community include fragmentation, development, increased nutrient status, inappropriate fire regimes, invasion by exotic plants, grazing by horses and rabbits, erosion from use of bicycles, motorcycles and from excessive pedestrian use. The principal weed species found in the place; pampas grass, lantana and bitou bush, have been greatly reduced by a volunteer bush regeneration program. Weed reduction is more obvious in the coastal section of the headland. Limited dumping of garden refuse continues. Feral animals, including rabbits, cats and dogs are present on the headland. Periodic fires occur in both sections of the headland, although there are no signs that species diversity has yet been affected. Increasing the frequency of fire events combined with unrestricted trail bike activity will, however, lead to further fragmentation of the vegetation and is a key threatening process to the long-term viability of the vegetation community.

Although access to the place is restricted for safety reasons, the headland is used for passive recreational pursuits such as walking.. The effect of trail bike riding is noticeable in the widening of tracks and the creation of jump obstacles. Evidence of vandalism is widespread. Obvious examples include recent graffiti covering the historic fortifications and the dumping and burning of cars. Condition assessed 2000.

The condition of the landscape is good to high.

== Heritage listing ==
As at 8 December 2004, Malabar Headland contains two significant bushland remnants — referred to as the coastal section and the western section. Together, these contain what is probably the largest area of essentially unmodified bushland in Sydney's Eastern Suburbs. The bushland is a significant part of one of two semi-natural corridors between Botany Bay and Port Jackson. The two sections support at least seven distinct plant communities. This diversity of habitats is only matched in the Eastern Suburbs in Botany Bay National Park.

The vegetation communities of Malabar Headland are of scientific and educational significance because they contain rare examples of coastal communities growing on Pleistocene sand deposits within the Sydney region. These communities have different species composition to those found elsewhere in the Sydney region.

Both the coastal and western sections of Malabar Headland support a high diversity of plant species, with species composition reflecting changes in aspect. At least three hundred plant species occur within the place and only fifty percent of the place's flora is common to both sections.

Eastern Suburbs Banksia Scrub, a nationally endangered ecological community occurs as heath and scrub in the coastal section and as a low woodland in the more protected western section. Eastern Suburbs Banksia Scrub is regarded as of extremely high conservation significance, due to the extent of previous clearing. The community was once common on Quaternary sands in the Eastern suburbs of Sydney; now less than one percent of the original community remains and is restricted to Malabar Headland and La Perouse.

The western section contains remnants of dunes believed to have been formed as a result of the last major glacial period. These occur adjacent to sandstone outcrops and provide an opportunity to study the place's geomorphological formation.

Malabar Headland demonstrates much of the range of landscapes which originally occurred in the Eastern Suburbs, including coastal rock platforms, sea cliffs and headlands in the coastal section, and sandstone escarpments and aeolian sand dunes in the western section.

The place contains the last known population of the once extensive Port Jackson mallee (EUCALYPTUS OBSTANS, formerly OBTUSIFLORA) in the Eastern Suburbs of Sydney.

The place includes a World War Two coastal defence site of historic significance, the Boora Point Battery. This is an imposing, purpose built coastal landmark which is important for providing tangible evidence of Australia's coastal defence efforts in the Sydney area during World War Two. The battery features a number of particularly unusual attributes, including a rare example of 6 inch Mark XII gun mountings, a completely underground counter bombardment facility, with gun crew ready rooms, ammunition supply and engine room and a small gauge sunken railway associated with an imposing observation post. The battery has particular social significance to World War Two veterans and those involved in its war time operations, or interested in the history of fortifications. The area includes a number of additional sites of cultural heritage value, including World War Two graffiti, and features associated with a significant town service - the south-west ocean outfall sewer.

Malabar Headland was listed on the New South Wales State Heritage Register on 22 July 2005 having satisfied the following criteria:

The place is important in demonstrating the course, or pattern, of cultural or natural history in New South Wales.

The Malabar Headland is of state significance as the place includes a World War Two coastal defence site of state significance, the Boora Point Battery. This is an imposing, purpose built coastal landmark which is important for providing tangible evidence of Australia's coastal defence efforts in the Sydney area during World War Two.

The Aboriginal heritage values of the Malabar Headland are still being identified in consultation with the Aboriginal community.

The place has a strong or special association with a person, or group of persons, of importance of cultural or natural history of New South Wales's history.

N.B. The Aboriginal heritage values of the Malabar Headland are still being identified in consultation with the Aboriginal community.

The place is important in demonstrating aesthetic characteristics and/or a high degree of creative or technical achievement in New South Wales.

N.B. The Aboriginal heritage values of the Malabar Headland are still being identified in consultation with the Aboriginal community.

The place has a strong or special association with a particular community or cultural group in New South Wales for social, cultural or spiritual reasons.

The Malabra Headland is of State significance as the extant battery has particular social significance to World War Two veterans and those involved in its war time operations, or interested in the history of fortifications.

The Aboriginal heritage values of the Malabar Headland are still being identified in consultation with the Aboriginal community.

The place has potential to yield information that will contribute to an understanding of the cultural or natural history of New South Wales.

The Malabar Headland is of State significance as it contains the largest area of diverse native bushland in the Sydney's Eastern Suburbs matched only by Botany Bay National Park and is one of few remaining examples of vegetation communities that were present prior to European occupation.

The Aboriginal heritage values of the Malabar Headland are still being identified in consultation with the Aboriginal community.

The place possesses uncommon, rare or endangered aspects of the cultural or natural history of New South Wales.

The Malabar Headland is of State significance as the extant battery features a number of particularly unusual attributes, including a rare example of 6 inch Mark XII gun mountings, a completely underground counter bombardment facility, with gun crew ready rooms, ammunition supply and engine room and a small gauge sunken railway associated with an imposing observation post. The site also contains the only known population of the rare Port Jackson Mallee, and populations of the endangered Eastern Suburbs Banksia Scrub.

The Aboriginal heritage values of the Malabar Headland are still being identified in consultation with the Aboriginal community.

The place is important in demonstrating the principal characteristics of a class of cultural or natural places/environments in New South Wales.

N.B. The Aboriginal heritage values of the Malabar Headland are still being identified in consultation with the Aboriginal community.

== See also ==
- Aboriginal Cultural Heritage Act 2003
- ANZAC Rifle Range
- Australian Light Horse
- Malabar Battery
