= Banksia 'Giant Candles' =

Cultivar of Banksia spinulosa

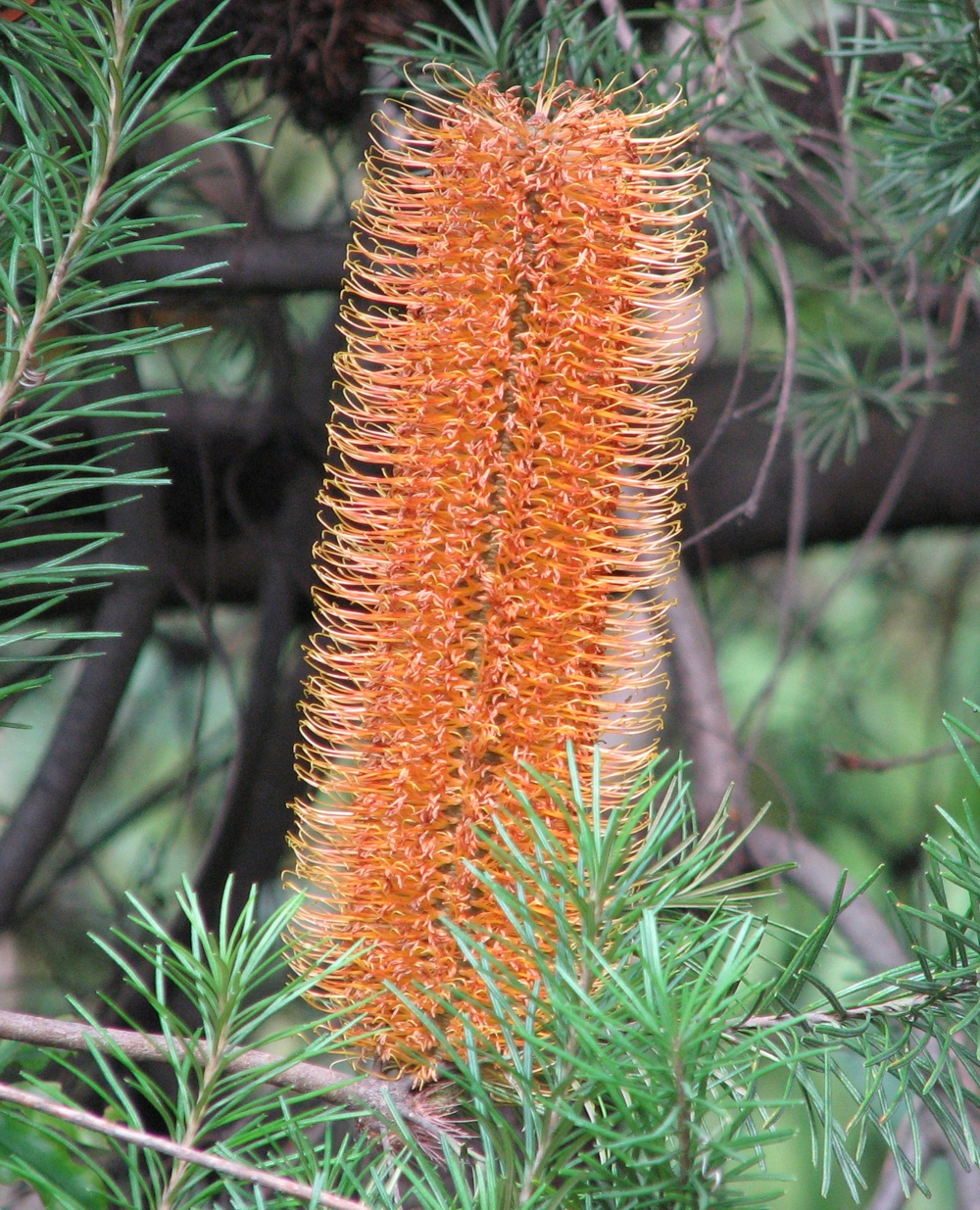
- Hybrid parentage: Banksia ericifolia × B. spinulosa var. cunninghamii
- Cultivar: 'Giant Candles'
- Origin: Sylvia E Peach, Sunnybank Hills, Queensland, 1979

Banksia 'Giant Candles' is a registered Banksia cultivar. It is a hybrid between the Gosford form of B. ericifolia (heath-leaved banksia) and a form of B. spinulosa var. cunninghamii.

It looks like a shrub, and this form, that is equally broad as tall, can grow up to 5 metres. It is well known for its extremely large flower spikes, which easily can become 40 cm long. They have a habit of drooping or bending occasionally. The flowers are a bronzy-orange and will be showy from late autumn through winter. They grow in most well-drained soils, and will flower best if grown in full sun. In an ideal area, they will grow up to 800 mm per year. In areas where irrigation is limited, they will not produce a heavy canopy, but will produce about 30% shade under its evergreen foliage.

Russell Costin of Limpinwood Nursery, who originally propagated and registered it in the 1970s, has reported its popularity waned for a few years but has become more popular in the last decade. Angus Stewart reported it to be iron hungry, so treat yellowing with iron chelate or iron sulfate.

Banksia 'Yellow Wing' is a hybrid derived from Banksia Giant Candles and Banksia spinulosa var. collina.
