= Malabar Battery =

Coordinates: 33°57′55″S 151°15′47″E

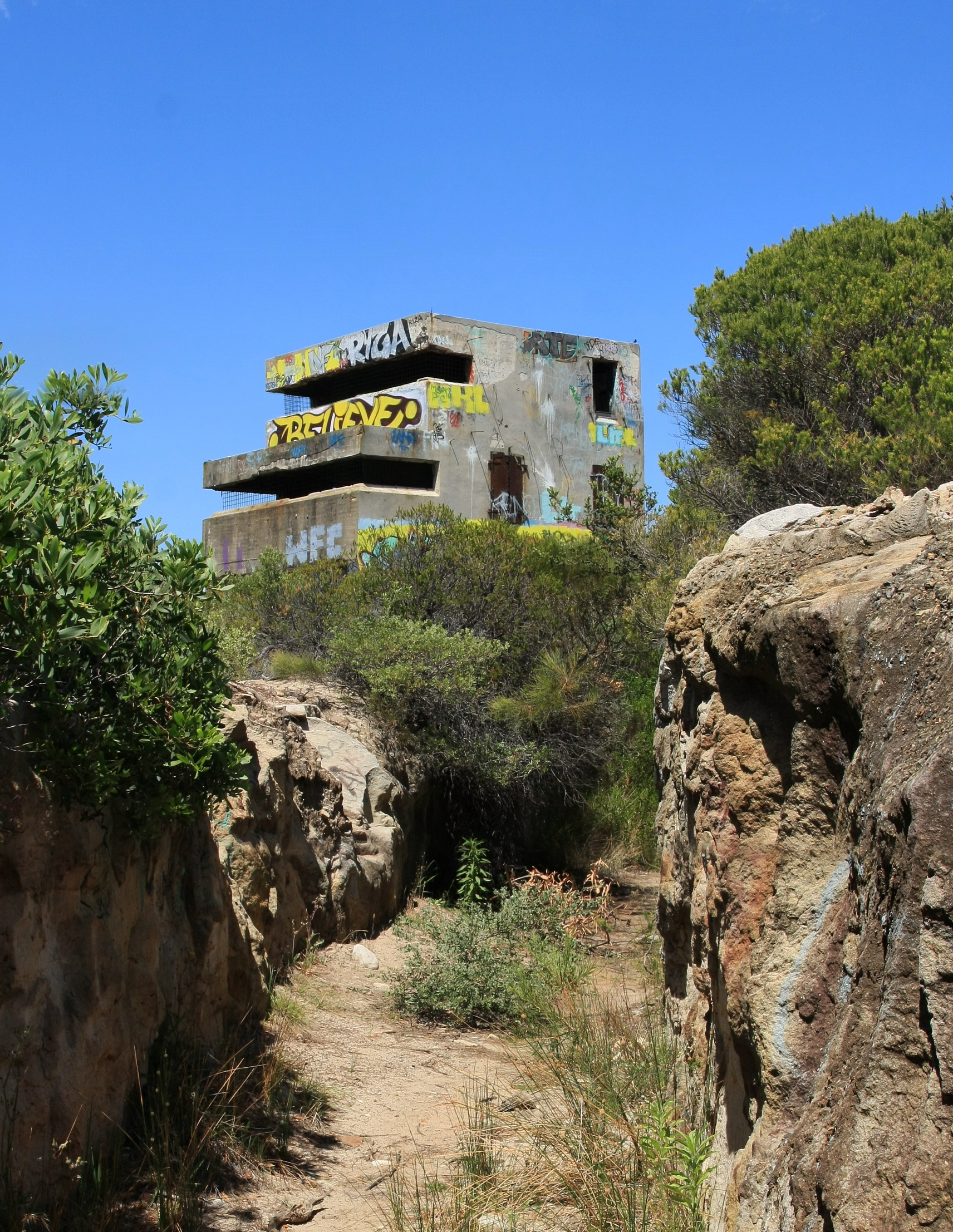
Four story observation post that forms part of the Malabar Battery and bunker complex.

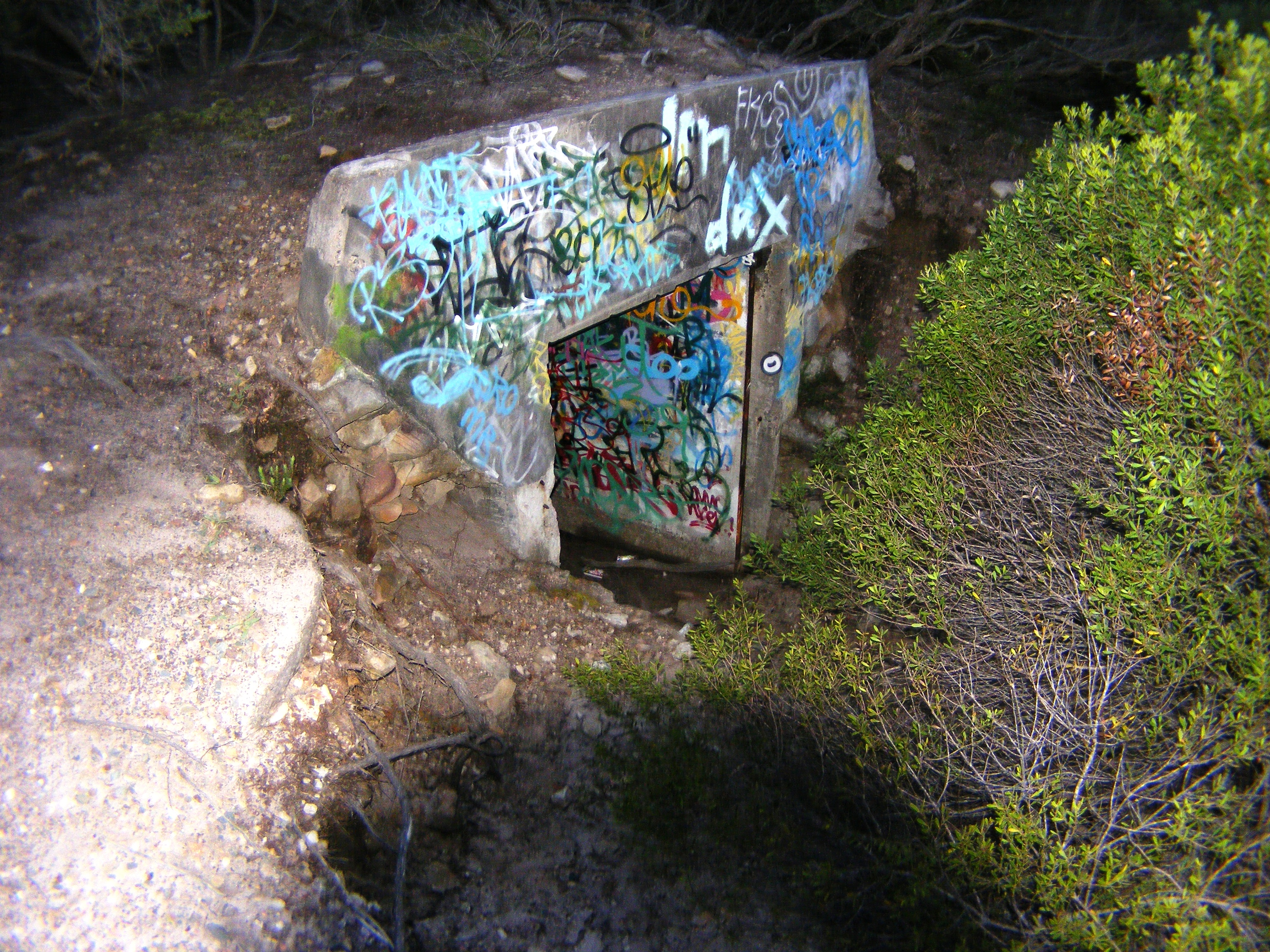
The main tunnel entrance to the Malabar Battery with the tram line running into it.

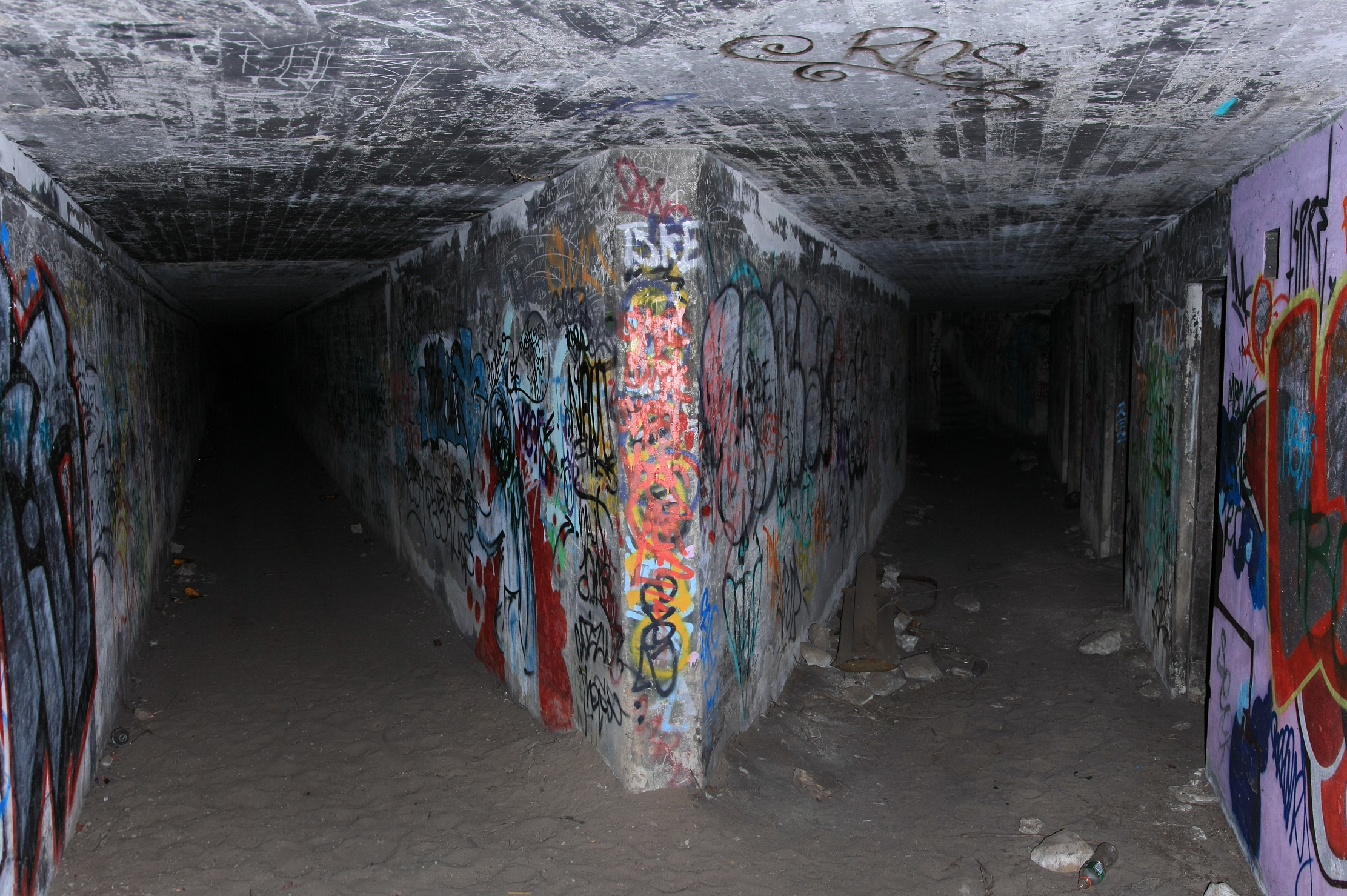
Looking in through the main tunnel entrance. There are two tunnels that lead to two different gun emplacements with tram lines running through them.

Malabar Battery was a coastal defence battery built in 1943 during World War II at Malabar Headland in Sydney, Australia. The battery is also known as Boora Point Battery.

The battery was constructed to complement the existing coastal defence batteries at nearby Henry Battery, Banks Battery and Bare Island Fort.

Two 6 inch Mark XII guns in gun emplacements on mountings were constructed at the battery. An underground counter bombardment facility, with gun crew ready rooms, ammunition supply and engine room together with a narrow-gauge tramway which was cut into the sandstone and lined with sandstone and a large battery observation post were also constructed at the battery.

The tramway was a single track of 560mm (22 in) and was to transport the 6" projectile munitions to the shell expense stores/magazines in the base of each gun emplacement. The tramway traverses through a deep continuous cutting lined with sandstone leads from the ammunition drop off point to the basement of the ammunition supply room and up to the two gun emplacements. Before reaching the gun emplacements the line enters a rectangular section concrete tunnel which is 94 m (310 ft) long.

Also constructed as part of the battery were northern and southern searchlight blockhouses with associated engine rooms and the battery barracks and toilet blocks.

Following decommissioning of the gun emplacements after the war, the site fell into disrepair.

== Gallery ==
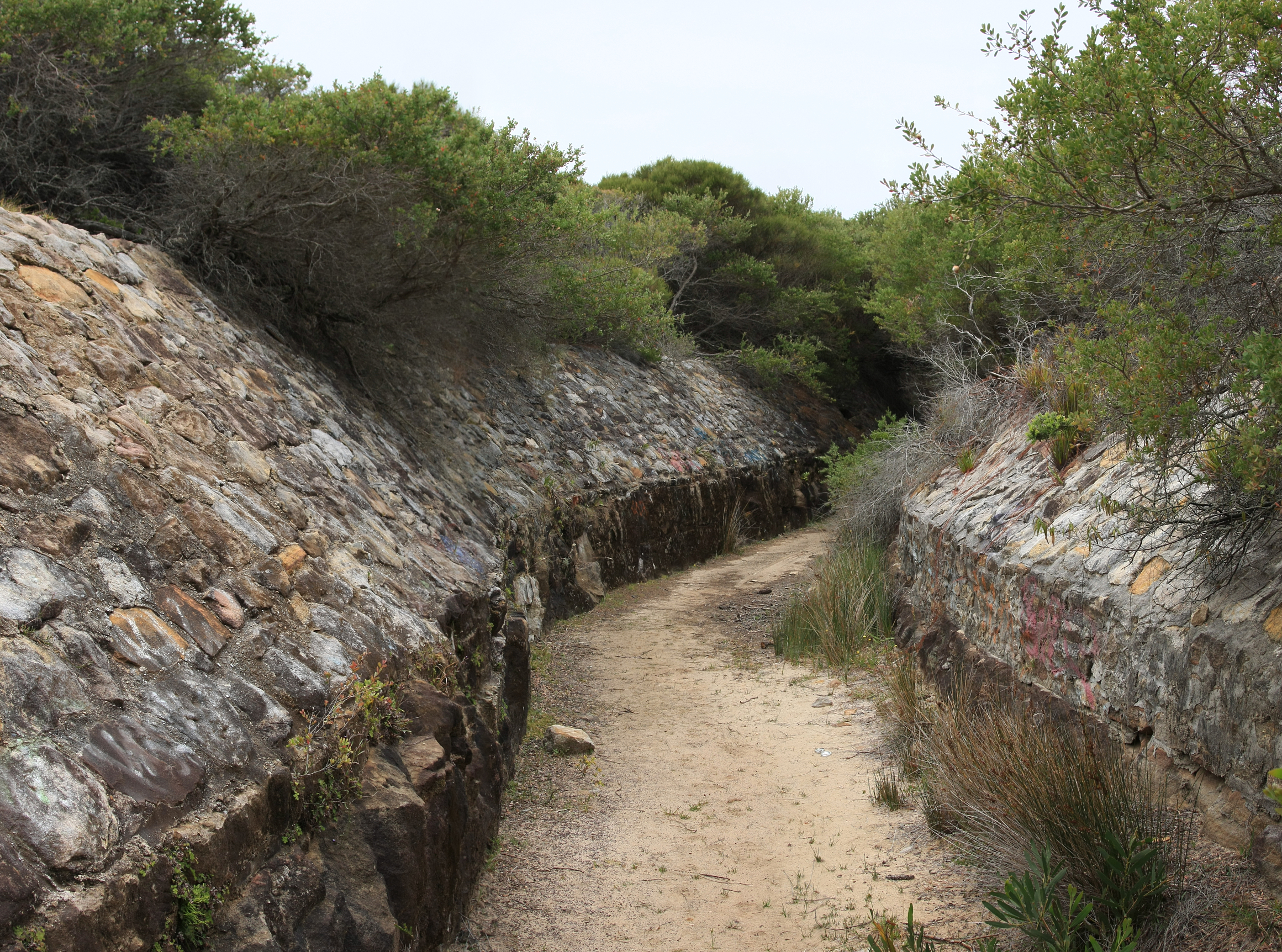
A tram line leading into the battery.

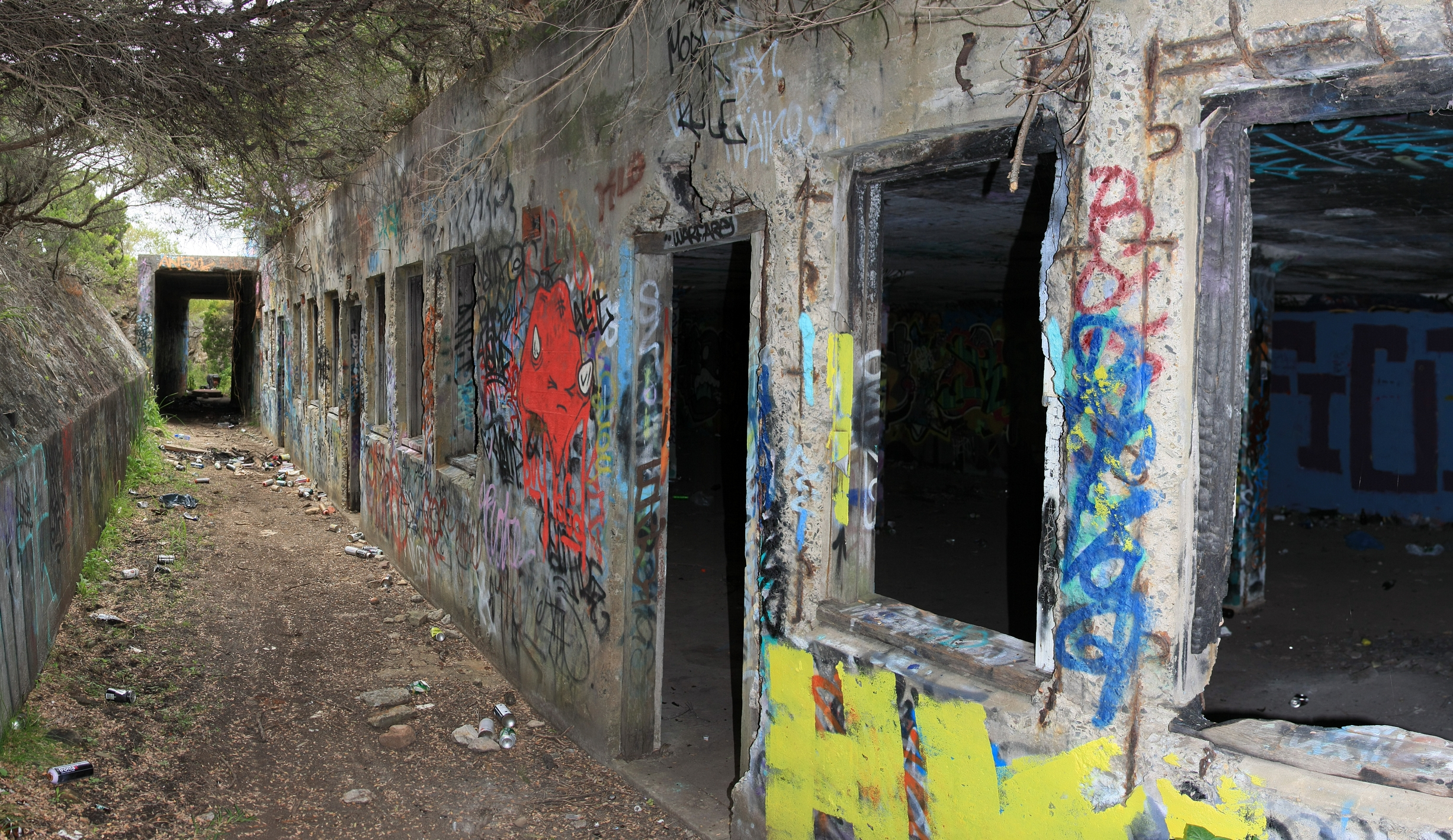
Barracks located alongside the tram line and adjacent to the four story observation post.

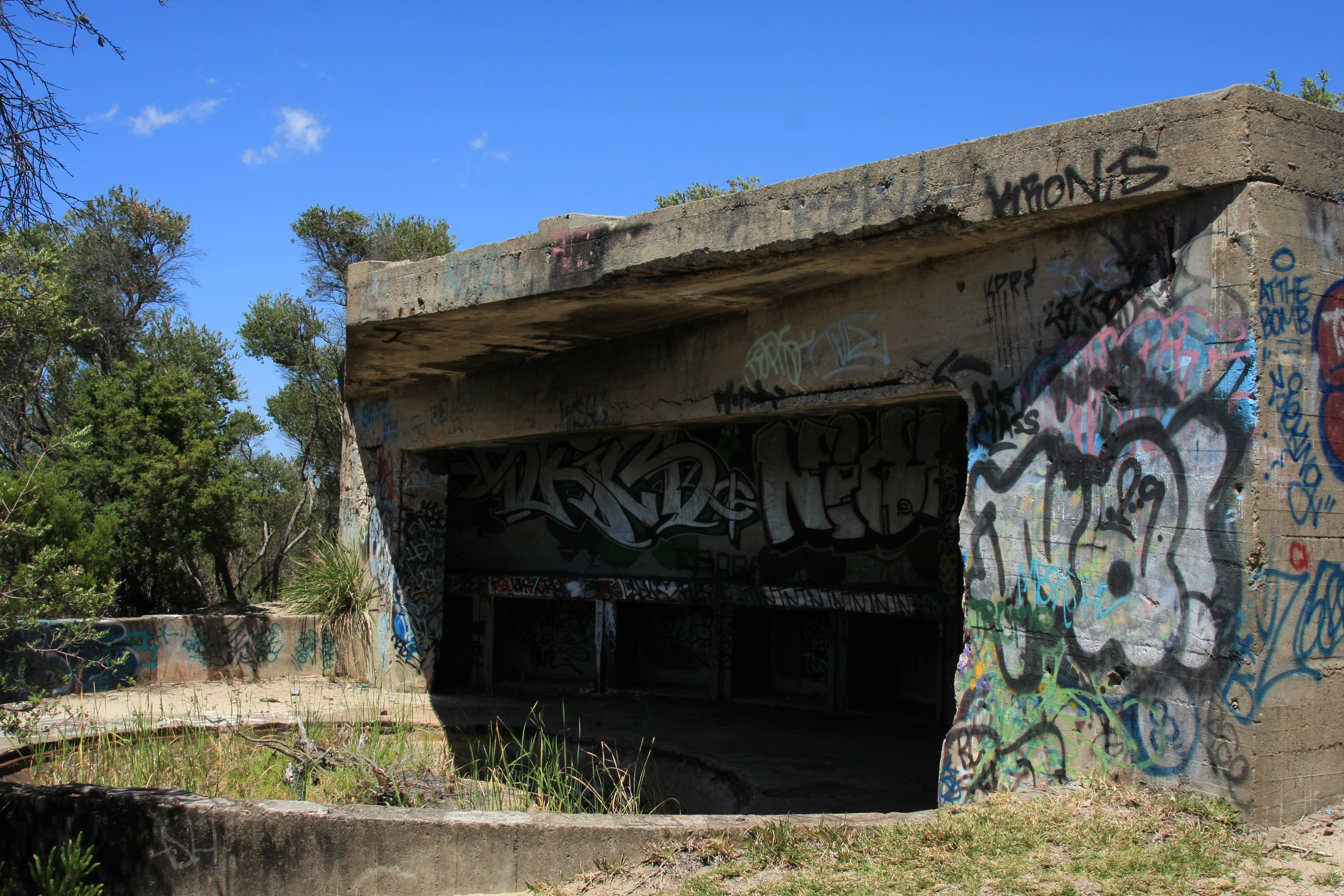
The battery's southernmost gun emplacement.

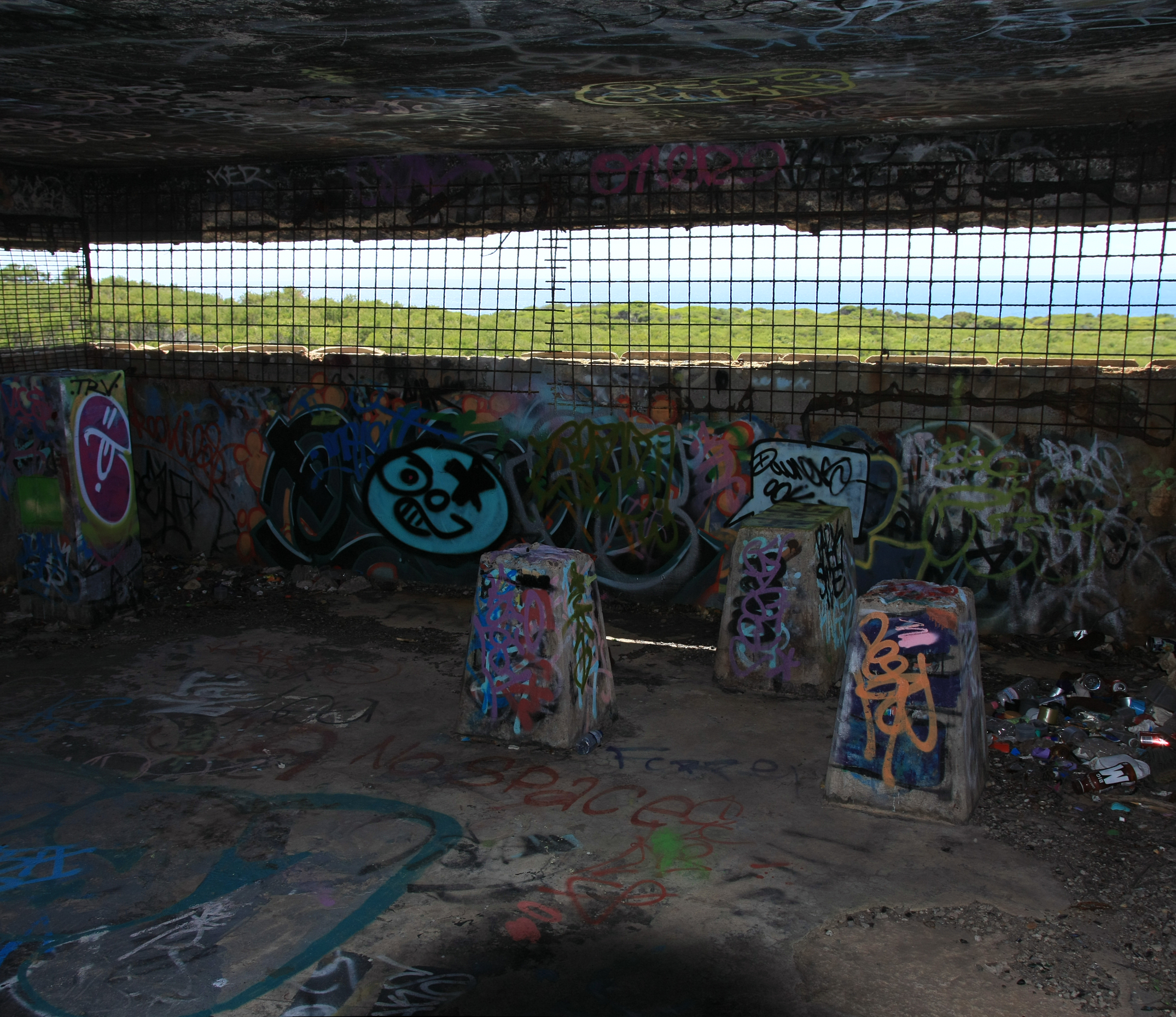
Inside the observation post.
