= Banksia 'Yellow Wing' =

Cultivar of Banksia spinulosa

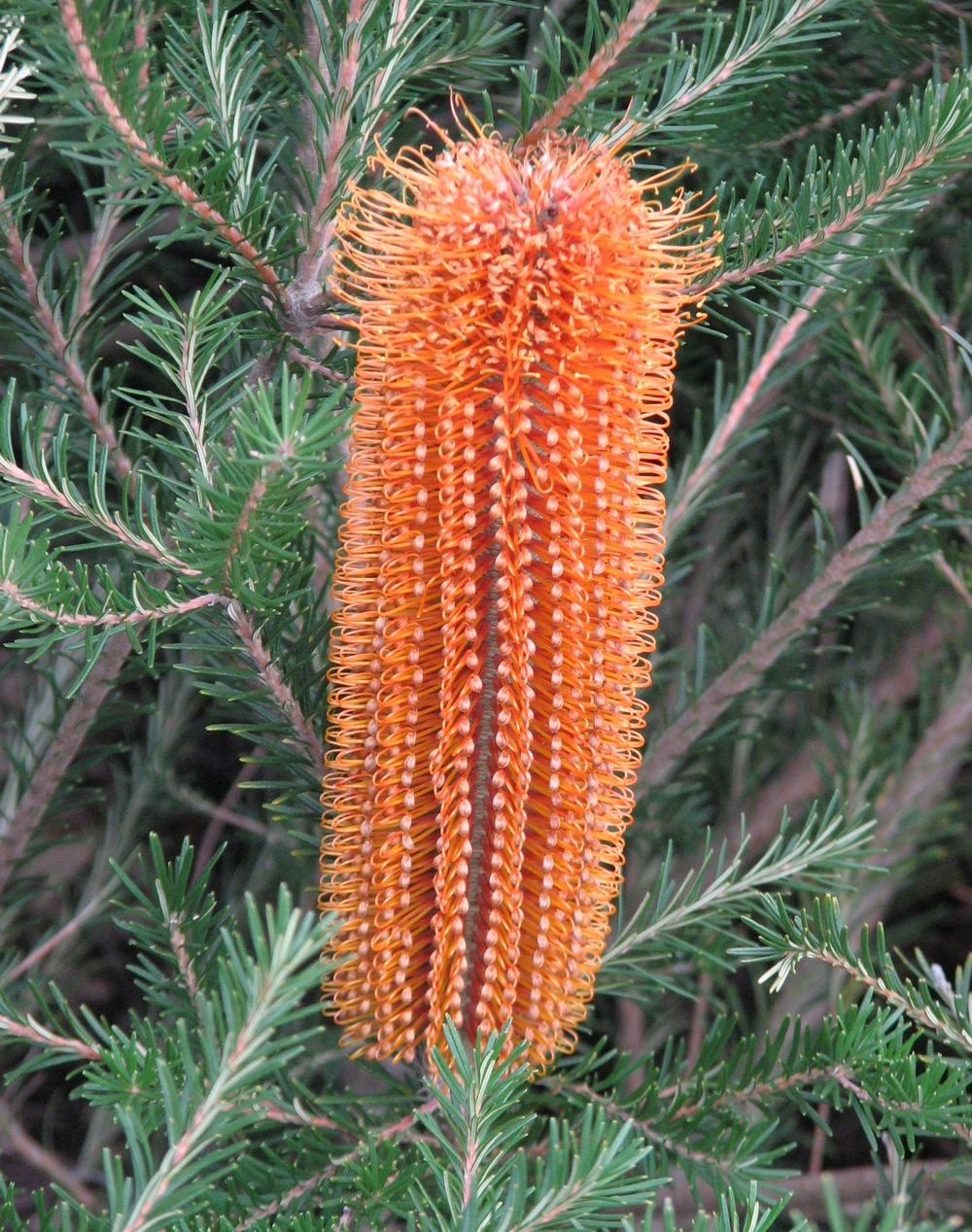
- Genus: Banksia
- Cultivar: 'Yellow Wing'
- Origin: Austraflora Nurseries, Victoria, Australia

Banksia 'Yellow Wing' is a Banksia cultivar developed by Austraflora Nurseries of Dixons Creek in Victoria, Australia.

The cultivar grown to about 1.8 metres in both height and width and has large gold inflorescences held above the foliage.

It is a hybrid between Banksia 'Giant Candles' and Banksia spinulosa var. collina from Carnarvon Gorge in Queensland. The cultivar name references the yellow-winged honeyeater which is attracted to the inflorescences.

The cultivar is suitable to hedge or screen planting and flowers can be cut and used fresh or dried. It is tolerant of a range of climatic conditions and can withstand mild frosts. It prefers a position in full sun or partial shade, and is adaptable to dry conditions once established.
