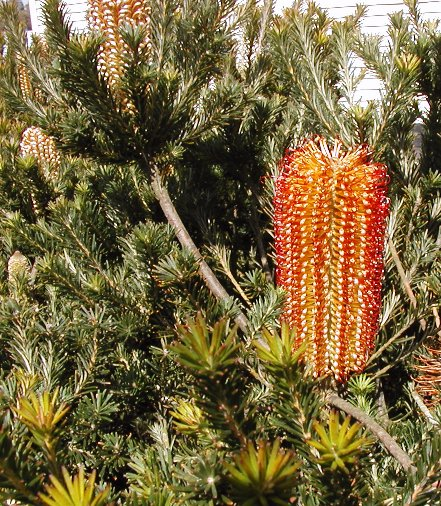
- Banksia ericifolia, cultivated at Colac, Victoria

Conservation status
- Least Concern (IUCN 3.1)

Scientific classification
- Kingdom: Plantae
- Clade: Tracheophytes
- Clade: Angiosperms
- Clade: Eudicots
- Order: Proteales
- Family: Proteaceae
- Genus: Banksia
- Species: B. ericifolia

Binomial name
- Banksia ericifolia L.f.

Subspecies
- B. ericifolia subsp. ericifolia; B. ericifolia subsp. macrantha
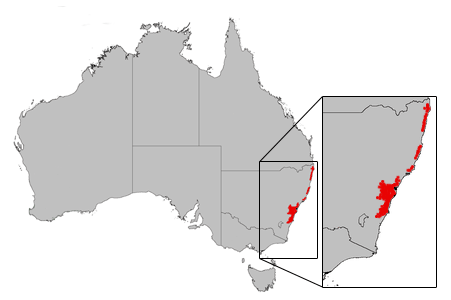
- Distribution map of Banksia ericifolia

Synonyms
- Banksia ericaefolia L.f. orth. var.; Banksia phylicaefolia Salisb. nom. illeg., nom. superfl.; Isostylis ericifolia (L.f.) Britten; Sirmuellera ericifolia (L.f.) Kuntze

= Banksia ericifolia =

Species of shrub native to Australia

Banksia ericifolia, the heath-leaved banksia, or lantern banksia, is a species of woody shrub of the family Proteaceae native to Australia. It grows in two separate regions of Central and Northern New South Wales east of the Great Dividing Range. Well known for its orange or red autumn inflorescences, which contrast with its green fine-leaved heath-like foliage, it is a medium to large shrub that can reach 6 m (20 ft) high and wide, though is usually half that size. In exposed heathlands and coastal areas, it is more often 1–2 m (3.3–6.6 ft).

Banksia ericifolia was one of the original Banksia species collected by Joseph Banks around Botany Bay in 1770 and was named by Carl Linnaeus the Younger, son of Carl Linnaeus, in 1782. A distinctive plant, it has split into two subspecies: Banksia ericifolia subspecies ericifolia of the Sydney region and Banksia ericifolia subspecies macrantha of the New South Wales Far North Coast which was recognised in 1996.

Banksia ericifolia has been widely grown in Australian gardens on the east coast for many years, and is used to a limited extent in the cut flower industry. Compact dwarf cultivars such as Banksia 'Little Eric' have become more popular in recent years with the trend toward smaller gardens.

== Description ==
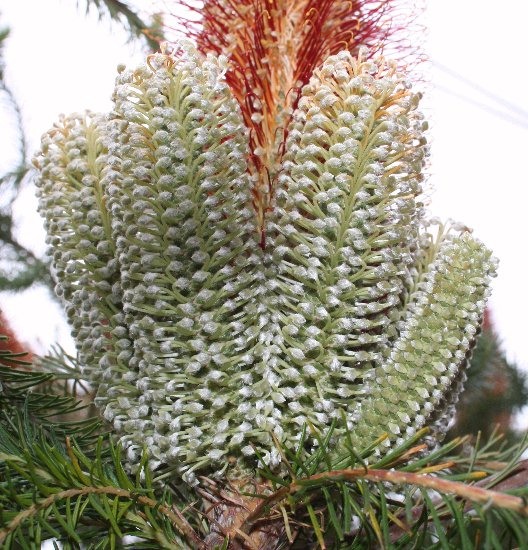
B. ericifolia "White Candles" showing rare multiple spikes

Banksia ericifolia grows as a large shrub up to 6 metres (20 feet) in height, though often smaller, around 1–2 metres (3.5–6.5 ft), in exposed places such as coastal or mountain heathlands. The grey-coloured bark is smooth and fairly thin with lenticels; however it can thicken significantly with age. The linear dark green leaves are small and narrow, 9–20 mm (1/4–3/4 in) long and up to 1 mm wide, generally with two small teeth at the tips. The leaves are crowded and alternately arranged on the branches. New growth generally occurs in summer and is an attractive lime green colour.

Flowering is in autumn, or in winter in cooler areas; the inflorescences are flower spikes 7–22 cm (2.8–8.7 in) high and 5 cm (2.0 in) broad or so. Each individual flower consists of a tubular perianth made up of four fused tepals, and one long wiry style. Characteristic of the taxonomic section in which it is placed, the styles are hooked rather than straight. The styles' ends are initially trapped inside the upper perianth parts, but break free at anthesis, when the flowers open. The spikes are red or gold in overall colour, with styles golden, orange, orange-red or burgundy. Some unusual forms have striking red styles on a whitish perianth. Very occasionally, forms with all yellow inflorescences are seen. Though not terminal, the flower spikes are fairly prominently displayed emerging from the foliage; they arise from two- to three-year-old nodes.

Old flower spikes fade to brown and then grey with age; old flower parts soon fall, revealing numerous small dark grey to dull black finely furred follicles. Oblong in shape and 15–20 mm (9/16–13/16 in) in diameter, the follicles are ridged on each valve and remain closed until burnt by fire. Banksia ericifolia responds to fire by seeding, the parent plant being killed. As plants take several years to flower in the wild, it is very sensitive to too-frequent burns and has been eliminated in some areas where these occur. With time and the production of more cones with seed-containing follicles, however, plants can store up to 16,500 seeds at eight years of age. Some plants produce multiple flower spikes, possibly of varying sizes, from a single point of origin.

== Taxonomy ==
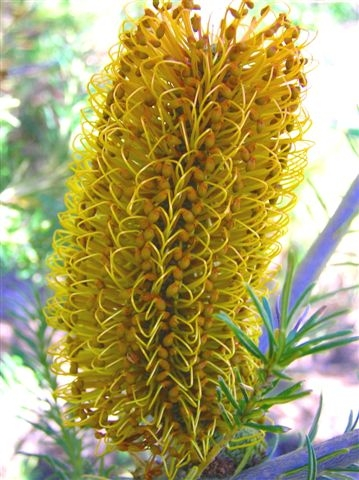
Banksia ericifolia, unusual yellow flowers, late bud cult. near Falls Creek, NSW

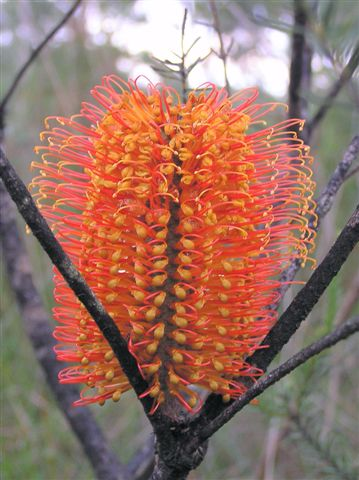
More usual red styles on orange body. Erowal Bay, NSW

B. ericifolia was first collected at Botany Bay on 29 April 1770, by Sir Joseph Banks and Dr Daniel Solander, naturalists on the Endeavour during Lieutenant (later Captain) James Cook's first voyage to the Pacific Ocean. Solander coined the (unpublished) binomial name Leucadendrum ericaefolium in Banks' Florilegium. However, the species was not published until April 1782, when Carl Linnaeus the Younger described the first four Banksia species in his Supplementum Plantarum. Linnaeus distinguished the species by their leaf shapes and named them accordingly. Thus the species with leaves reminiscent of heather (at the time classified in the genus Erica) was given the specific name ericaefolia, from the Latin erica, meaning "heather", and folium, meaning "leaf". This spelling was later adjusted to "ericifolia"; thus the full name for the species is Banksia ericifolia L.f., with the initials L.f. identifying Carolus Linnaeus the Younger.

While many Banksia species have undergone much taxonomic change since publication, the distinctive B. ericifolia has remained largely unchanged as a species concept. Consequently, the species has no taxonomic synonyms; it does, however, have three nomenclatural synonyms. The first synonym, Banksia phylicaefolia Salisb, was published by the English botanist Richard Anthony Salisbury in his 1796 Prodromus stirpium in horto ad Chapel Allerton vigentium. It was intended as a replacement name for B. ericaefolia, but Salisbury gave no reason why such a replacement was necessary. The name was therefore superfluous, and hence illegitimate. The second synonym was created in 1891, when Otto Kuntze, in his Revisio Generum Plantarum, rejected the generic name Banksia L.f., on the grounds that the name Banksia had previously been published in 1776 as Banksia J.R.Forst & G.Forst, referring to the genus now known as Pimelea. Kuntze proposed Sirmuellera as an alternative, referring to this species as Sirmuellera ericifolia. For the same reason, James Britten transferred the species to the genus Isostylis as Isostylis ericifolia in 1905. These applications of the principle of priority were largely ignored, and Banksia L.f. was formally conserved and Sirmuellera rejected in 1940.

A recent change to the species' taxonomy is the recognition, in 1981, of an infraspecific taxon. The existence of different forms of B. ericifolia was first recognised in 1979 by the amateur botanist Alf Salkin, who noted three distinct forms of the species, with one being a possible hybrid with Banksia spinulosa var. cunninghamii. Salkin gave his northern form the provisional infraspecific name "microphylla", but when Alex George published a formal description in his 1981 The genus Banksia L.f. (Proteaceae), he named it B. ericifolia var. macrantha. In 1996, it was promoted to subspecific rank as B. ericifolia subsp. macrantha.

=== Placement within Banksia ===
Banksia ericifolia has traditionally been described as lying within series Spicigerae of Banksia, together with Banksia spinulosa and various western Hairpin-like Banksias such as B. seminuda and B. brownii. This series is placed in Banksia sect. Oncostylis according to Alex George's taxonomy of Banksia, but directly into Banksia subg. Banksia in Thiele's arrangement based on cladistic analysis. Kevin Thiele additionally placed it in a subseries Ericifoliae, but this was not supported by George.

Under George's taxonomic arrangement of Banksia, B. ericifolia's placement may be summarised as follows:

Genus Banksia

Subgenus Banksia

Section Banksia
Section Coccinea
Section Oncostylis

Series Spicigerae

B. spinulosa - B. ericifolia - B. verticillata - B. seminuda - B. littoralis - B. occidentalis - B. brownii

Series Tricuspidae
Series Dryandroidae
Series Abietinae

Subgenus Isostylis

Molecular research by American botanist Austin Mast suggests that B. spinulosa and B. ericifolia may be more closely related to Banksia ser. Salicinae, with includes Banksia integrifolia and its relatives.

In 2005, Mast, Eric Jones and Shawn Havery published the results of their cladistic analyses of DNA sequence data for Banksia. They inferred a phylogeny markedly different from the accepted taxonomic arrangement, including finding Banksia to be paraphyletic with respect to Dryandra. A full new taxonomic arrangement was not published at the time, but early in 2007 Mast and Australian botanist Kevin Thiele initiated a rearrangement by transferring Dryandra to Banksia, and publishing B. subg. Spathulatae for the species having spoon-shaped cotyledons; in this way they also redefined the autonym B. subg. Banksia. They foreshadowed publishing a full arrangement once DNA sampling of Dryandra was complete; in the meantime, if Mast and Thiele's nomenclatural changes are taken as an interim arrangement, then B. ericifolia is placed in B. subg. Spathulatae.

Hybrids with B. spinulosa var. spinulosa have been recorded in the wild, at Pigeon House Mountain in Morton National Park. Banksia 'Giant Candles' was a chance garden hybrid between B. ericifolia and B. spinulosa var. cunninghamii.

=== Subspecies ===
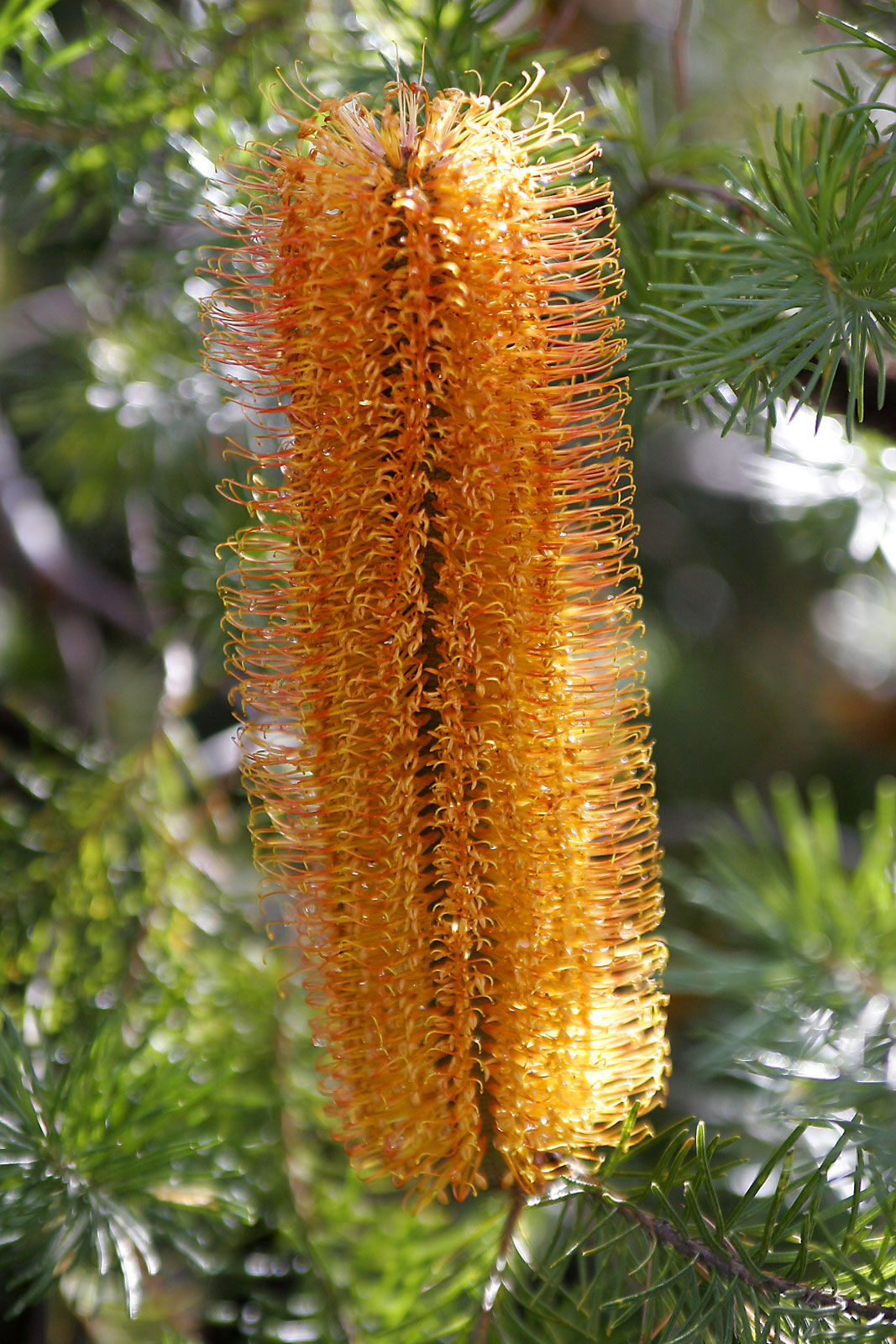
Orange flowers & long leaves, Australian National Botanic Gardens

Two geographically distinct forms are recognised:

Banksia ericifolia subsp. ericifolia
The nominate race is found in the Sydney basin, south to the Illawarra and north to Collaroy, as well as the Blue Mountains. The seedling leaves have 2–6 teeth on each margin, while the perianths are 19–22 mm (3/4–3/4 in) long and pistils are 30–35 mm (1 1/4–1 1/2 in) long. Salkin noted that this subspecies often grew in association with Banksia spinulosa var. cunninghamii and that there were plants with longer leaves some 20–25 mm (3/4–1 in) long with entire, curled margins. He gave them the name "longifolia" and suspected these may have been hybrids.

Banksia ericifolia subsp. macrantha
The northern race is found on the New South Wales north coast, from Crowdy Head northwards to the Queensland border. Described as a distinct subspecies in 1996 by Alex George from material he collected at Byron Bay in 1975, it is distinguished by finer foliage, more crowded leaves and larger flowers, with the perianths 26–28 mm (1.0–1.1 in) long and pistils 46–48 mm (1 3/4–2 in) long. The seedling leaves have one, or occasionally two teeth on each margin. Salkin observed that the inflorescences tended to be terminal rather than axial, and others have noted them to be sometimes taller than the nominate subspecies. Crowdy Bay, in particular, hosts specimens with spikes up to 26 cm (10 in) in height.

=== Name and symbolism ===
In 1992, B. ericifolia was adopted as the official plant of Sydney, and is sometimes seen in amenity plantings and parks around the city. It was known as wadanggari (pron. "wa-tang-gre") to the local Eora and Darug inhabitants of the Sydney basin.

== Distribution and habitat ==
In nature, the variety ericifolia is found on acidic sandstone-based soils; either in elevated heathland within 2 kilometres (1.2 mi) of the coast around the Sydney basin, from Collaroy south to Jervis Bay, or elevated sandstone soils in mountainous areas such as the Blue Mountains and the Budawangs. These heathlands are often moist, with access to some form of underground water, and can even be quite swampy. It can form dense thickets with the Dagger Hakea (Hakea teretifolia) and Scrub She-oak (Allocasuarina distyla). Other plants it associates with include the Coast Tea-tree (Leptospermum laevigatum) and smaller plants such as Woollsia pungens. The inflorescences are a feature of autumn bushwalking in sandstone areas, such as the Kings Tableland walk in the Blue Mountains, Jennifer Street Boardwalk in Little Bay, and Royal National Park.

The northern subspecies macrantha is found in two distinct regions on the far north coast of New South Wales; the first from Crowdy Bay on the Mid North Coast northwards to Hat Head National Park north of Port Macquarie, and then from Yuraygir National Park north to Kingscliff just south of the Queensland border. This variety is more strictly coastal with most populations being found within two kilometres of the coast, or in swampy areas. It may be associated with Banksia oblongifolia.

== Ecology ==
Like other banksias, B. ericifolia plays host to a wide variety of pollinators and is a vital source of nectar in autumn, when other flowers are scarce. It has been the subject of a number of studies on pollination. A 1998 study in Bundjalung National Park in Northern New South Wales found that B. ericifolia inflorescences are foraged by a variety of small mammals, including marsupials such as yellow-footed antechinus (Antechinus flavipes), and rodents such as pale field rat (Rattus tunneyi) and grassland mosaic-tailed rat (Melomys burtoni). These animals carry pollen loads comparable to those of nectarivorous birds, making them effective pollinators. A 1978 study found bush rat (Rattus fuscipes) to bear large amounts of pollen from B. ericifolia and suggested the hooked styles may play a role in pollination by mammals. Other visitors recorded include Western honey bee (Apis mellifera).

A great many bird species have been observed visiting this Banksia species. A 1985 study in the Sydney area of B. ericifolia var. ericifolia found numerous birds visiting the inflorescences, including the honeyeaters eastern spinebill (Acanthorhynchus tenuirostris), white-cheeked honeyeater (Phylidonyris nigra), New Holland honeyeater (Phylidonyris novaehollandiae), white-naped honeyeater (Melithreptus lunatus), yellow-faced honeyeater (Lichenostomus chrysops), red wattlebird (Anthochaera carunculata) and little wattlebird (Anthochaera chrysoptera), as well as the Silvereye (Zosterops lateralis). The beautiful firetail (Stagonopleura bella) also associates with this species. Some mammals were recorded in this study but were found to bear no pollen. Exclusion of certain pollinators showed that birds and insects were important for fertilisation. Additional species seen in The Banksia Atlas survey include white-eared honeyeater (Lichenostomus leucotis), white-plumed honeyeater (Lichenostomus penicillatus), crescent honeyeater (Phylidonyris pyrrhoptera), noisy miner (Manorina melanocephala), and species of friarbird for B. ericifolia var. ericifolia and brown honeyeater (Lichmera indistincta), tawny-crowned honeyeater (Gliciphila melanops) and black-faced cuckoo-shrike (Coracina novaehollandiae) for B. ericifolia var. macrantha.

Insects recovered from inflorescences include the banksia boring moth (Arotrophora canthelias), younger instars of which eat flower and bract parts before tunneling into the rachis as they get older and boring into follicles and eating seeds. This tunneling itself damages the architecture of the spike and prevents seed development. Other seed predators include unidentified species of moth of the genus Cryptophasa, as well as Scieropepla rimata, Chalarotona intabescens and Chalarotona melipnoa, Brachmia trinervis, Carposina hyperlopha and an unidentified weevil species.

Like most other Proteaceae, B. ericifolia has proteoid roots—roots with dense clusters of short lateral rootlets that form a mat in the soil just below the leaf litter. These enhance solubilisation of nutrients, allowing nutrient uptake in low-nutrient soils such as the phosphorus-deficient native soils of Australia. The species lacks a lignotuber, and so is killed by fire and regenerates from seed.

Banksia ericifolia depends on fire for regeneration; if fires are too infrequent, populations age and eventually die out. However, too-frequent fires also threaten this species, which takes around six years to reach maturity and flower. One study estimated an optimum fire interval of 15–30 years. For a large part of its distribution Banksia ericifolia grows near areas of human habitation on Australia's eastern coastline. Bushland near urban areas is subject to both arson and prescribed burns, drastically reducing fire intervals and resulting in the disappearance of the species from some areas. The hotter a fire the more quickly seed is released; timing of rains afterwards is also critical for seedling survival.

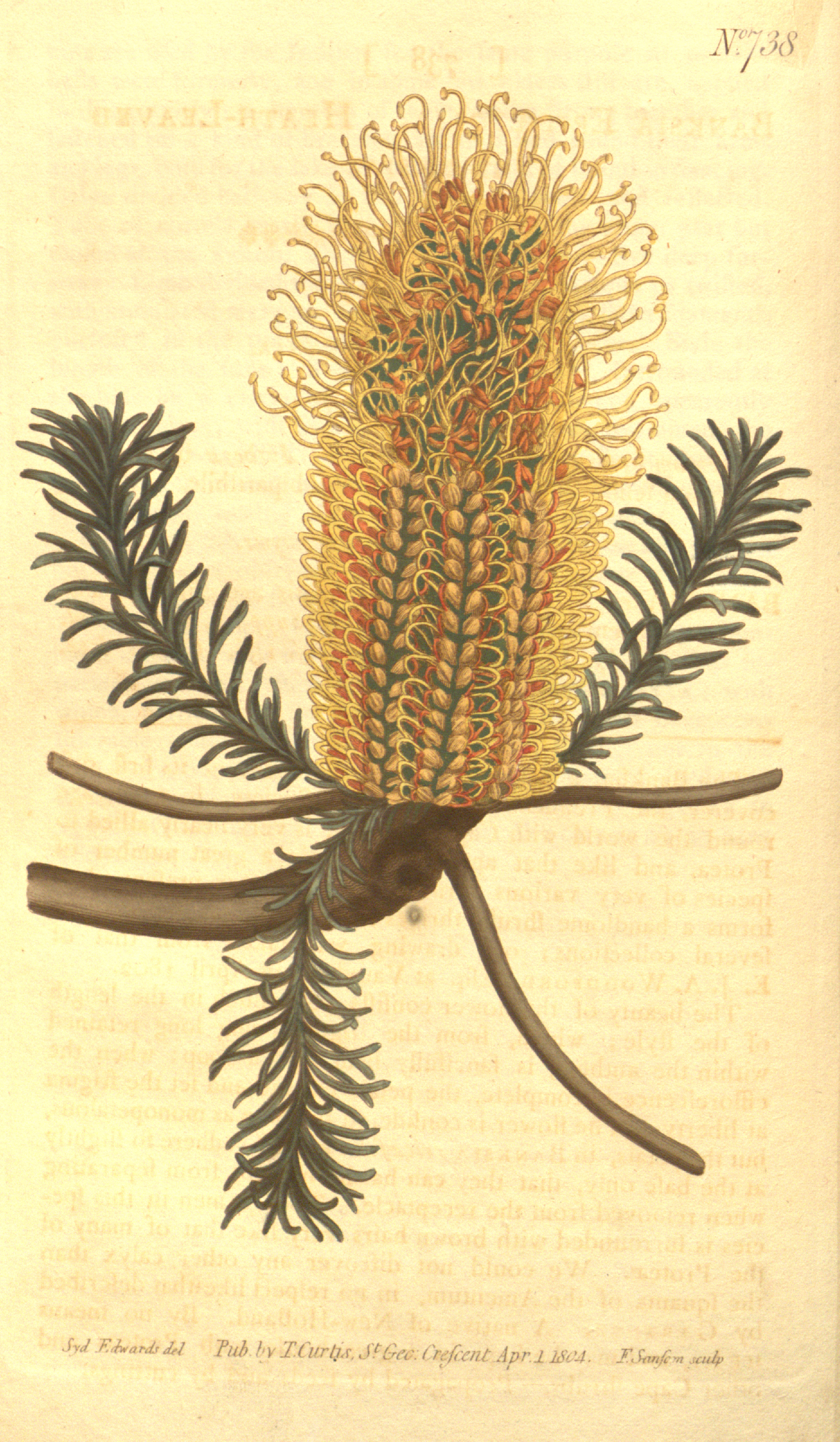
A plate featuring B. ericifolia, painted by Sydenham Edwards in 1802 and published in Curtis's Botanical Magazine in 1804

Banksia ericifolia is listed in Part 1 Group 1 of Schedule 13 of the National Parks and Wildlife Act 1974; this means that as a common and secure species it is exempted from any licensing or tagging requirements under the 2002–2005 management plan to minimise and regulate the use of protected and threatened plants in the cut-flower industry in New South Wales.

== Cultivation ==
Banksia ericifolia was one of the first Banksia species to be cultivated, having been introduced into cultivation in England in 1788. By 1804, it had flowered in several collections. That year a painting of the plant by Sydenham Edwards was featured in Curtis's Botanical Magazine, accompanied by text describing the species as "a handsome shrub [that] thrives freely".

Banksia ericifolia inflorescences attract a variety of birds to the garden. Tough enough to be used as a street plant in parts of Sydney, B. ericifolia is a fairly easy plant to grow in the conditions it likes, namely a sandy, well drained soil and a sunny aspect. It requires extra water over dryer periods until established, which may take up to two years, as it comes from an area with rainfall in predominantly warmer months. It is resistant to Phytophthora cinnamomi dieback, like most eastern banksias. As it grows naturally on acid soils, Banksia ericifolia is particularly sensitive to iron deficiency. Known as chlorosis, this problem manifests as yellowing of new leaves with preservation of green veins; it can occur on plants grown in soils of high pH. This can happen especially where soil contains quantities of cement, either as landfill or building foundations, and can be treated with iron chelate or sulfate.

Flowering may take some years from seed; a minimum of four years is average. Buying an advanced plant may hasten this process, as will getting a cutting-grown plant. Banksia ericifolia can be propagated easily by seed, and is one of the (relatively) easier banksias to propagate by cutting. Named cultivars are by necessity propagated by cuttings as this ensures that the plant produced bears the same attributes as the original plant.

Regular pruning is important to give the plant an attractive habit and prevent it from becoming leggy. Hard-pruning below green growth is not advisable with this banksia; since it lacks a lignotuber, it does not have dormant buds below the bark that respond to pruning or fire and therefore is unable to sprout from old wood as readily as commonly cultivated lignotuberous species, such as B. spinulosa and B. robur.

=== Cultivars ===
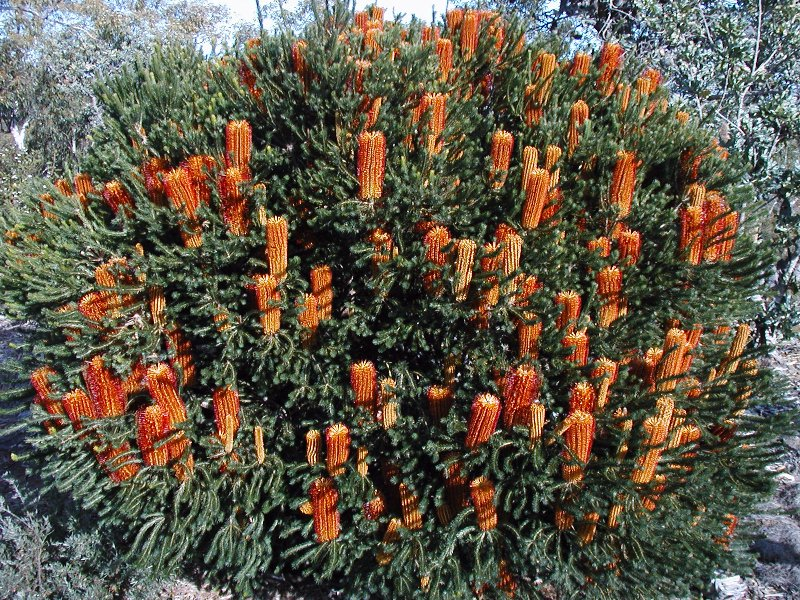
B. ericifolia 'Little Eric', showing compact habit. Cultivar in Kenthurst, NSW

For many years the horticulture industry focussed on registered selections of Banksia spinulosa, but since the late 1990s more and more cultivars of Banksia ericifolia have come on the market, including colour variants and dwarf forms. The latter are particularly attractive as the original plant may reach 6 metres in height, and the new cultivars help enthusiasts choose a plant that is right for their conditions and tastes. Banksia ericifolia is also grown for the cut flower industry in Australia, though not to the degree that the western Australian species such as B. coccinea and B. menziesii are.

There are a number of commercial varieties available from Australian retail nurseries; however none have yet been registered under plant breeders' rights legislation, and only one ('Limelight') is registered with the Australian Cultivar Registration Authority. The lack of official names has led to some varieties bearing several different names.

- Banksia ericifolia 'Bronzed Aussie' is a white-budded terminal-flowering form to 2 m with bronzed foliage; the inflorescences have honey-coloured pistils. It has been propagated by Victorian nurseryman Rod Parsons of Carawah Nursery in Hoddles Creek. A new release in 2003, its provenance is unknown; seed had been given to Rod's father by an SGAP member many years ago.
- Banksia ericifolia 'Golden Girl' is a golden yellow-flowered form which grows to 1.5–1.8 m (4.9–5.9 ft) in height with blue-grey foliage. It has hidden wide fat flowers to 8 cm high and has been propagated by Rod Parsons of Carawah Nursery. Released in 2003, its provenance is unknown (seed donated to Rod's father by an SGAP member many years ago.)
- Banksia ericifolia 'Kanangra Gold', propagated by Kuranga Nursery in Melbourne, is a gold flowered form to 4 m (13 ft) from the Kanangra-Boyd region of the Blue Mountains. It is bushy and flowers are much paler than the regular orange or red forms.
- Banksia ericifolia 'Limelight', registered with Australian Cultivar Registration Authority (ACRA) in 1987, is a large plant to 5 m (16 ft) with bright lime green foliage and orange blossoms. It is seldom seen due to the current focus on smaller forms for smaller gardens.

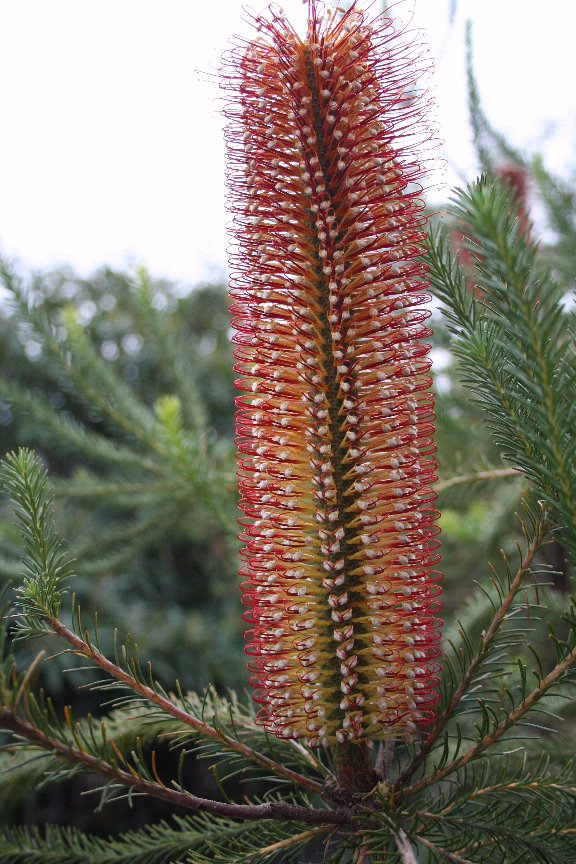
B. ericifolia 'White Candles' Cultivar in Sydney, NSW

- Banksia ericifolia 'Little Eric' is a dwarf form reaching 1 or 2 m (3.3 or 6.6 ft); the inflorescences have maroon styles and whitish perianth. It is propagated by Richard Anderson of Merricks Nursery on the Mornington Peninsula southeast of Melbourne, the original having arisen as a chance garden seedling.
- Banksia ericifolia 'Purple Pygmy', also called B. 'Port Wine', is a dwarf form propagated by Kuranga Nursery that grows to 1 m (3.3 ft) with purplish foliage with claret flowers. It only flowers rarely and is difficult to propagate. Also, due to low demand it is only propagated in low numbers.
- Banksia ericifolia 'Red Rover' is a dwarf cultivar reaching 1.8 m (5.9 ft) with a more open habit than other forms of similar size. This form has lime green foliage and scarlet-red flowers and was propagated by Rod Parsons of Carawah Nursery from a garden selection and released in 2004.
- Banksia ericifolia 'St Pauls' is a dwarf form that grows to 2 m (6.6 ft) with conspicuous red inflorescences which has been available from time to time from Cranebrook Nursery in Sydney's western suburbs. It was originally propagated from a plant cultivated at St Pauls' secondary school (a local high school).
- Banksia ericifolia 'White Candles/Christmas Candles', also known as B. ericifolia 'Ruby Clusters', originated from a plant growing in the Sutherland Shire in Sydney's south. It has an unusual red style/white body colour combination somewhat reminiscent of B. coccinea. The buds are white and contrast with the red styles that emerge through them. It is an open shrub to 3–4 m (9.8–13.1 ft).
- Banksia ericifolia macrantha 'Creamed Honey', so called because its flowers are the colour of creamed honey, is a pale flowered variant originally found at Crowdy Head on the New South Wales north coast. Propagated by Kuranga nursery, it grows to 4 or 5 m (13 or 16 ft) with a more open habit. It is notable in that it is the only cultivar of the northern subspecies of Banksia ericifolia currently available.
