= Banksia 'Limelight' =

Cultivar of Banksia ericifolia

- Species: Banksia ericifolia
- Cultivar: 'Limelight'
- Origin: Kariong, New South Wales, Australia

Banksia 'Limelight', also known by its extended cultivar name Banksia ericifolia 'Limelight', is a registered cultivar of Banksia ericifolia (heath-leaved banksia). It has bright lime-green foliage, otherwise appearing typical of B. ericifolia. It grows at about half the rate of B. ericifolia, and can only be propagated vegetatively.

It arose as a sport from a mature plant found growing near an expressway at Kariong, New South Wales in 1986. Cuttings were propagated, and a cultivar registered by Phil Packham in December 1987. Propagating rights are with Princeton Nursery, Mount White. Due to little consumer interest, the two existing plants have not been propagated from for some years.
