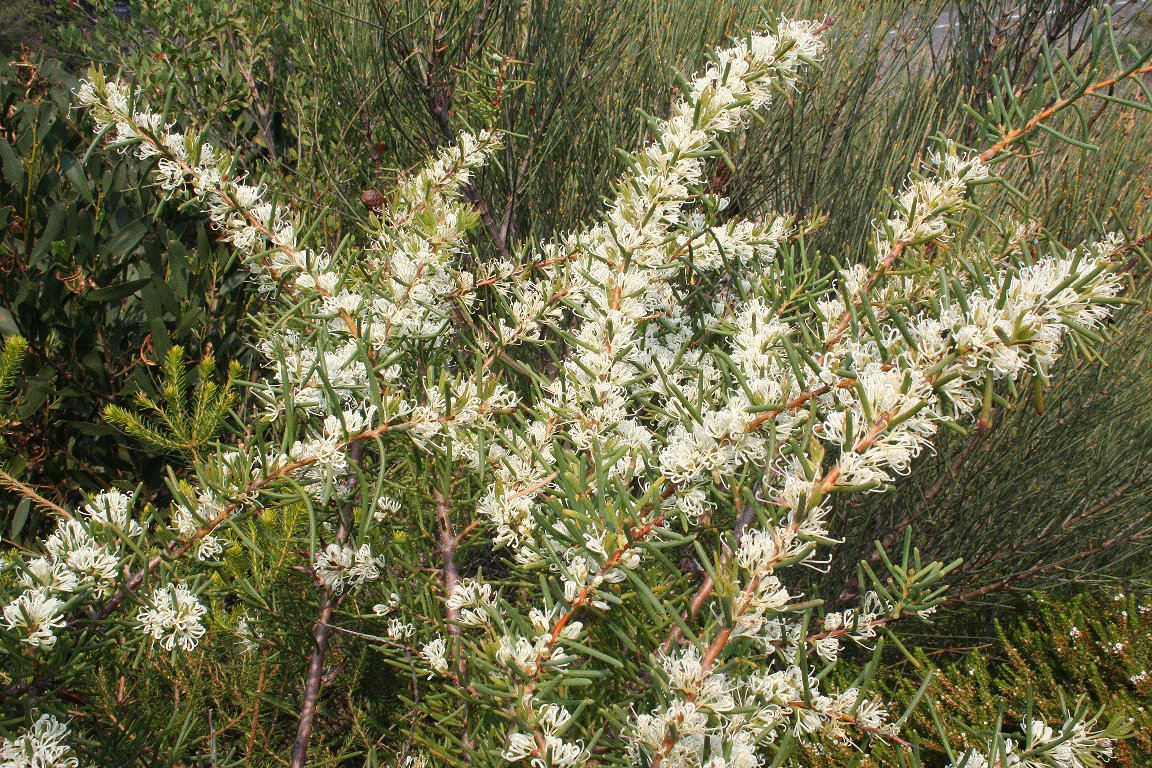
- Hakea teretifolia in Botany Bay National Park near Kurnell

Scientific classification
- Kingdom: Plantae
- Clade: Tracheophytes
- Clade: Angiosperms
- Clade: Eudicots
- Order: Proteales
- Family: Proteaceae
- Genus: Hakea
- Species: H. teretifolia

Binomial name
- Hakea teretifolia (Salisb.) Britten

Synonyms
- Banksia teretifolia Salisb.; ? Hakea longifolia Dum.Cours.; Lambertia teretifolia C.F.Gaertn. nom. illeg.

= Hakea teretifolia =

Dagger hakea

Species of plant

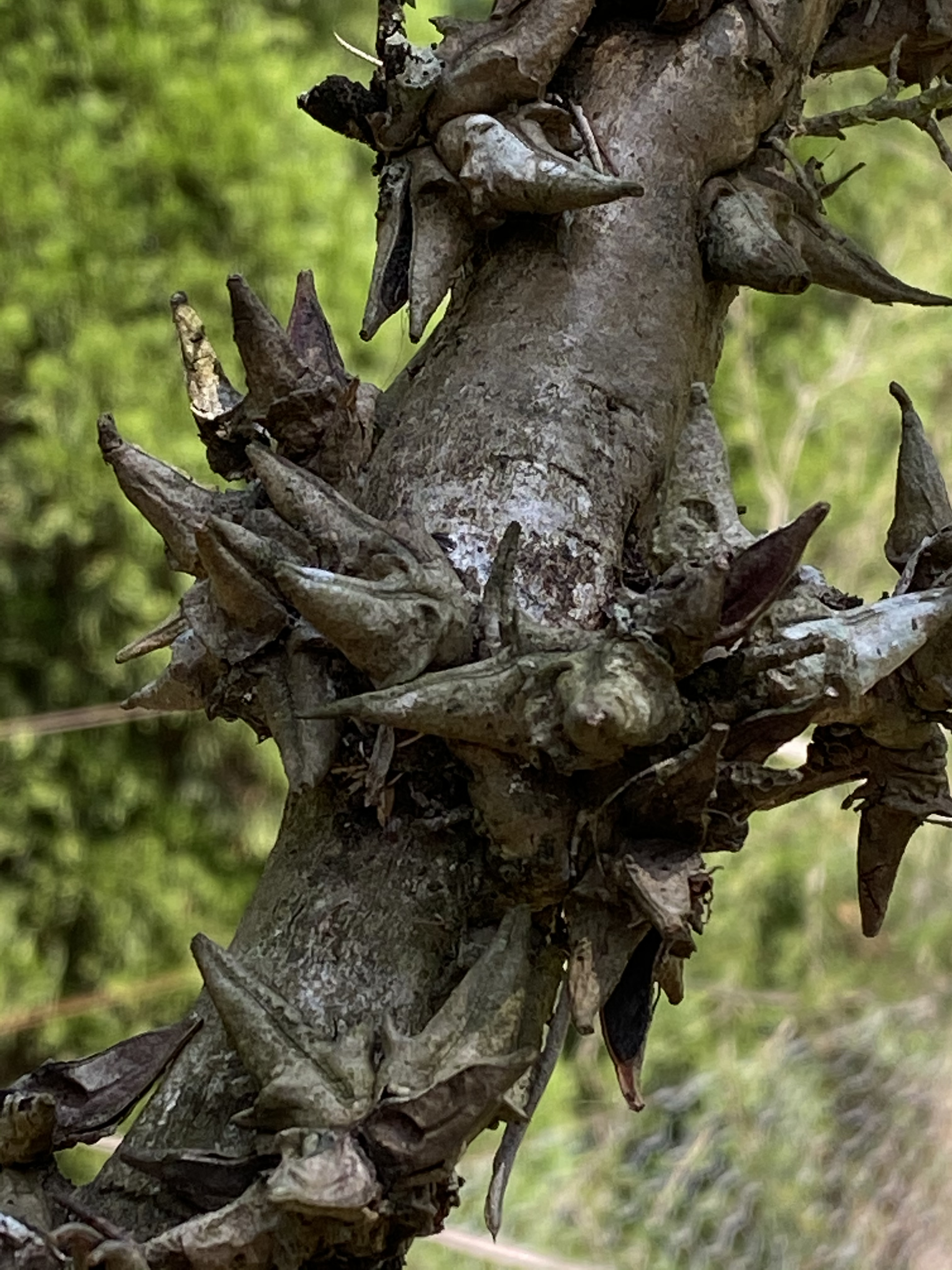
Fruit

Hakea teretifolia, commonly known as the dagger hakea, is a species of woody shrub of the family Proteaceae and is common on heathlands in coastal eastern Australia from northern New South Wales through to Victoria and Tasmania. A very prickly shrub, it is rarely cultivated but easy to grow.

== Description ==
Hakea teretifolia is a prickly shrub that can reach 4 m (13 ft) in height. It has spirally arranged, thick, tough, succulent spike-tipped leaves. Flowering occurs in summer though some may be seen in winter. The small white inflorescences occur on branches and consist of 4–8 individual small flowers. These are followed by sharp pointed (dagger-shaped) seed pods from where the plant gets its common name.

== Taxonomy and naming ==
Hakea teretifolia was first collected at Botany Bay in April 1770, by Sir Joseph Banks and Daniel Solander, naturalists on the British vessel HMS Endeavour during Lieutenant (later Captain) James Cook's first voyage to the Pacific Ocean. Solander coined the (unpublished) binomial name Leucadendroides corniculata in Banks' Florilegium. Richard Salisbury described the species in his book Prodromus stirpium in horto ad Chapel Allerton vigentium in 1796 and gave it the name Banksia teretifolia. The specific epithet (teretifolia) is from the Latin teretifolium, meaning "with terete leaves".

In 1797, Heinrich Schrader and Johann Christoph Wendland described the genus Hakea and the type species Hakea glabra in their book Sertum Hannoveranum.

In 1916, James Britten changed the name of Salisbury's Banksia teretifolia to Hakea teretifolia in the Journal of Botany, British and Foreign. Britten considered Schrader's Hakea glabra, Antonio José Cavanilles' Hakea pugioniformis and Joseph Gaertner's Conchium teretifolium to be synonyms. The Australian Plant Census lists H. glabra, H. pugioniformis and C. teretifolium as synonyms of H. teretifolia subsp. teretifolia. Hakea teretifolia was classified in Hakea sect. Hakea series Pubiflorae by George Bentham in his Flora Australiensis, but was reclassified on its own in the Teretifolia group in the 1999 Flora of Australia treatment.

In 1990, Robyn Mary Barker described two subspecies of H. teretifolia in the Journal of the Adelaide Botanic Gardens, and the names are accepted by the Australian Plant Census:

- H. teretifolia (Salisb.) Britten subsp. teretifolia; which ranges from Coffs Harbour south through the Sydney region to the Budawang Range in New South Wales.
- H. teretifolia subsp. hirsuta (Endl.) R.M.Barker that has more densely hairy perianths and pedicels. It is an upright, spreading shrub 1–4 m (3 ft 3 in – 13 ft 1 in) high. Its branchlets are densely covered with short, soft, matted hairs, smooth at flowering. It has rigid, straight, needle-shaped leaves 0.5–7.7 cm (0.20–3.03 in) long, 0.8–1.7 mm (0.031–0.067 in) wide and cream-white flowers from November to February. It occurs further south from the Sydney region through to Tasmania with a separate population in the Grampians in western Victoria.

== Distribution and habitat ==
Hakea teretifolia grows on damp or wet low-nutrient soil, in sandstone soil-based heathland, and can form dense thickets with the heath banksia (Banksia ericifolia) and scrub she-oak (Allocasuarina distyla). It grows in moist to wet locations in heath and woodlands east of Melbourne and a disjunct population in the Grampians.

It is found in woodland alongside scribbly gum (Eucalyptus haemastoma), peppermint gum (E. piperita) and red bloodwood (Corymbia gummifera).

== Ecology ==
Hakea teretifolia is killed by bushfire and regenerates by seed, though plants with lignotubers have been recorded.

== Use in horticulture ==
Hakea teretifolia is rarely cultivated but is an easy plant to grow provided it has a sunny aspect. Unlike many other proteaceae it can be tolerant of poor drainage. Its extremely prickly foliage can make a good deterrent. When planted in clumps, this species provides an excellent shelter for small birds such as superb fairywrens (Malurus superbus) and the smaller sized honeyeaters. It can also prove a prickly deterrent for burglars.
