= Hereward (ship) =

British clipper ship

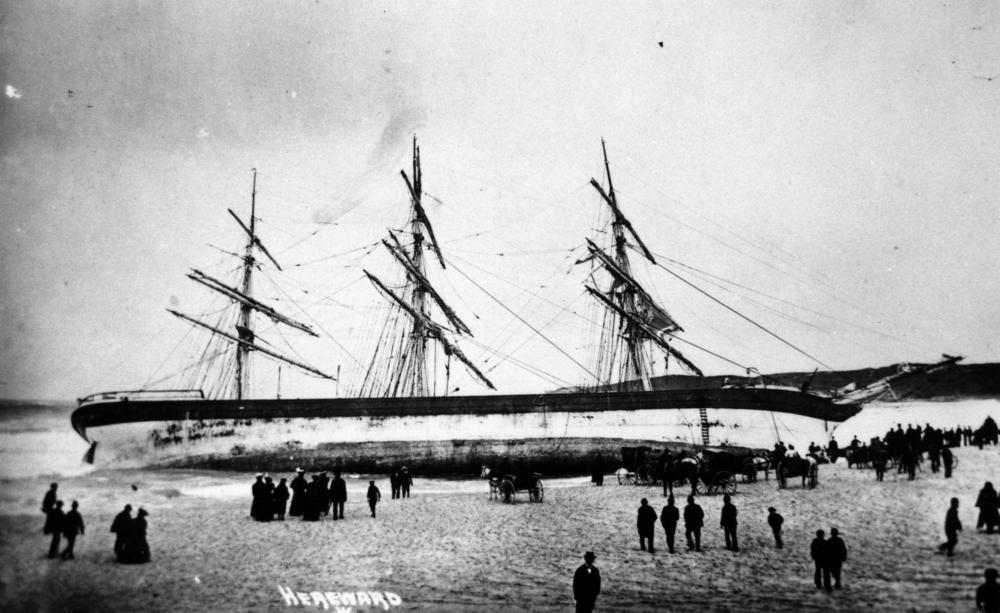
- Hereward on Maroubra Beach in 1898

History

United Kingdom
- Name: Hereward
- Namesake: Hereward the Wake
- Owner: 1878: John Campbell, John Potter & others; 1896: The "Hereward" Ship Co
- Operator: 1896: Potter Brothers
- Port of registry: London
- Builder: Robert Duncan & Co, Port Glasgow
- Launched: 14 August 1877
- Identification: UK official number 77010; code letters RBKV
- Fate: Stranded and wrecked, 1898

General characteristics
- Type: iron-hulled clipper
- Tonnage: 1,593 GRT, 1,513 NRT
- Length: 254.0 ft (77.4 m)
- Beam: 39.0 ft (11.9 m)
- Depth: 23.2 ft (7.1 m)
- Sail plan: full rig
- Crew: 25
- Armament: bronze signal cannon

Hereward, was British clipper ship that was built in Scotland in 1877. She had an iron hull, three masts and full rig.

The ship was wrecked at Maroubra, New South Wales in 1898. Parts of the wreck survive in situ. The Underwater Cultural Heritage Act 2018 automatically protects the wreck and its contents, as they are more than 75 years old.

== Details ==
Robert Duncan and Company built Hereward at Port Glasgow, launching her on 14 August 1877. Her registered length was 254.0 feet (77.4 m) her beam was 39.0 feet (11.9 m) and her depth was 23.2 feet (7.1 m). Her tonnages were 1,593 GRT and 1,513 NRT.

Her first owners were John Campbell, John Potter, John Ashton and others. They registered her at London. Her United Kingdom was official number 77010 and her code letters were RBKV.

By 1896 her owners were The "Hereward" Ship Company of London, and her managers were Potter Brothers.

== Stranding ==
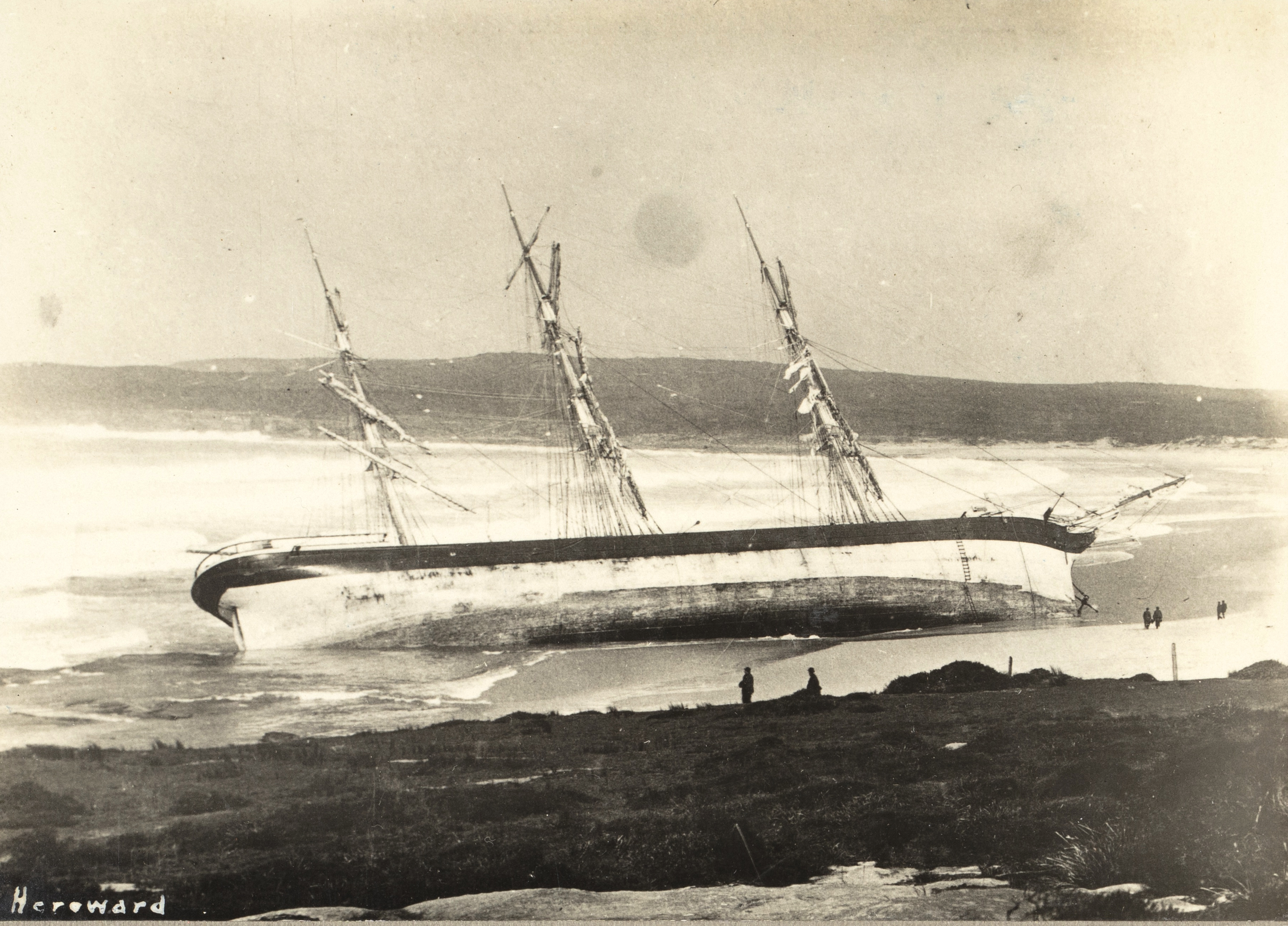
Hereward sailing ship, Maroubra, Sydney,1898

In May 1898 Hereward was sailing from Surabaya in the Dutch East Indies to Newcastle, New South Wales to load a cargo of coal to take to South America. Her Master was Captain Poole Hickman Gore (1861–1920).

On 5 May a storm forced her aground at the north end of Maroubra Beach, Sydney. All 25 crew members safely got ashore, where they reached a nearby wool scouring works.

== Attempted salvage ==
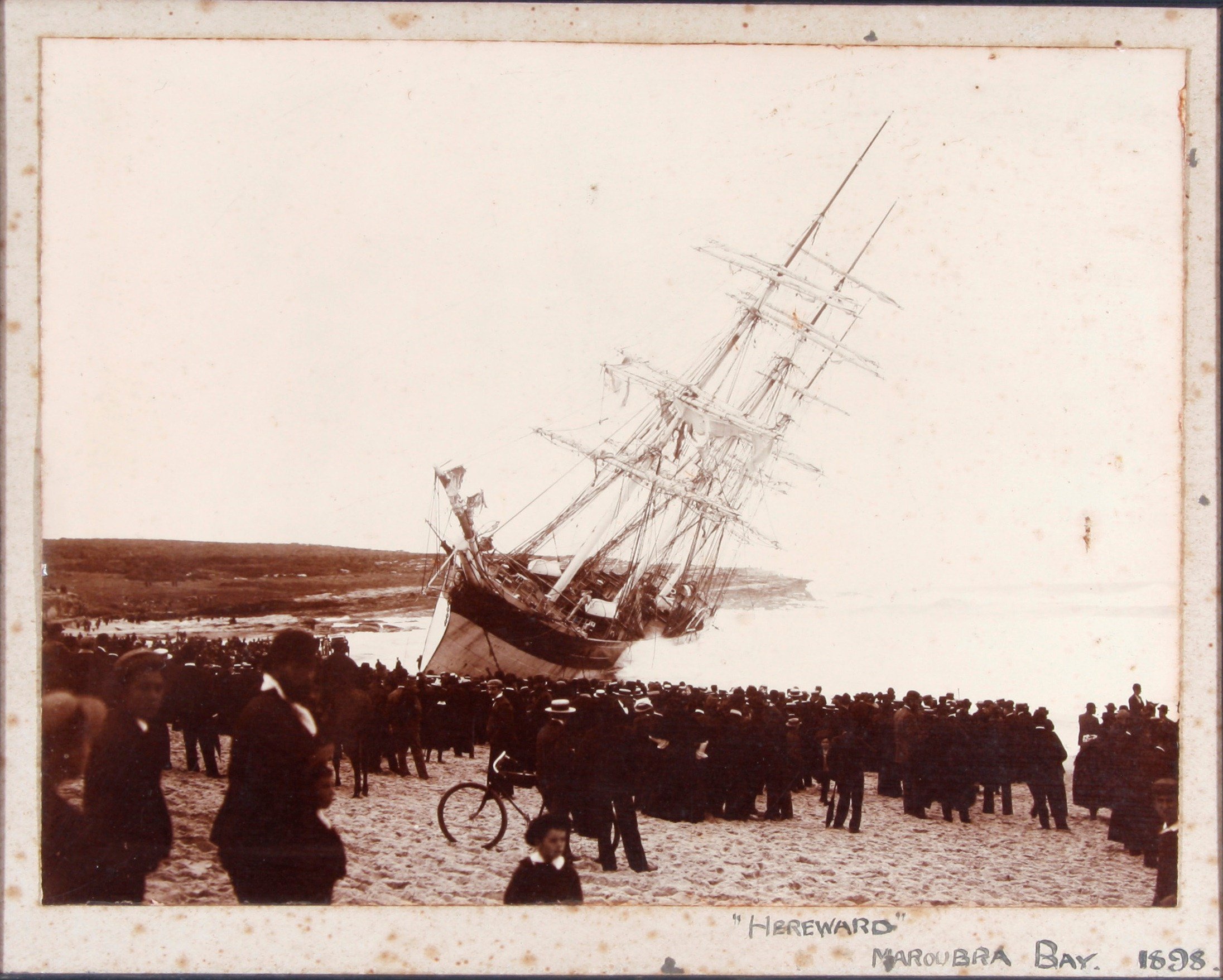
The wreck in 1898 with a crowd of onlookers

The ship was insured for £6,000. After a few months it was sold for £550 to Mahlon Clarke Cowlishaw (1844–1900), of Cowlishaw Brothers, Sydney merchants and ship-owners, who bought the wreck for salvage.

On 9 December 1898 it was attempted to refloat the Hereward. With the two tugs, Commodore and Irresistible, pulling on cables connected to the anchor 1,000 feet (300 m), and using steam winches aboard, they got the ship into 14 feet (4.3 m) of water. However, as the ship was nearly free, a southerly gale blew up and pushed her back onto the beach, where she was battered by high seas and broken in two.

== Wreck and heritage ==
The wreck was slowly washed out to sea afterwards and by 1937 only a triangle dorsal fin was visible above sea level. In 1950, Randwick Council feared of the danger that the remains posed to surfers and swimmers and had the remains blasted such that by 1967 it appeared that there was nothing left of the ship.

In recent times, on various occasions, swells and sweeping currents have moved large amounts of sand on the sea floor and had exposed extensive portions of the Hereward. In March 2013 after large seas, extensive parts of her iron hull, along with mast parts were exposed more than they ever had been before. In 2013 a bronze signal cannon was recovered from the wreck and is now on display in the foyer of the Maroubra Seals Club, across the road from the beach.

== Hereward Street ==
Hereward Street in Maroubra is named after the ship.
