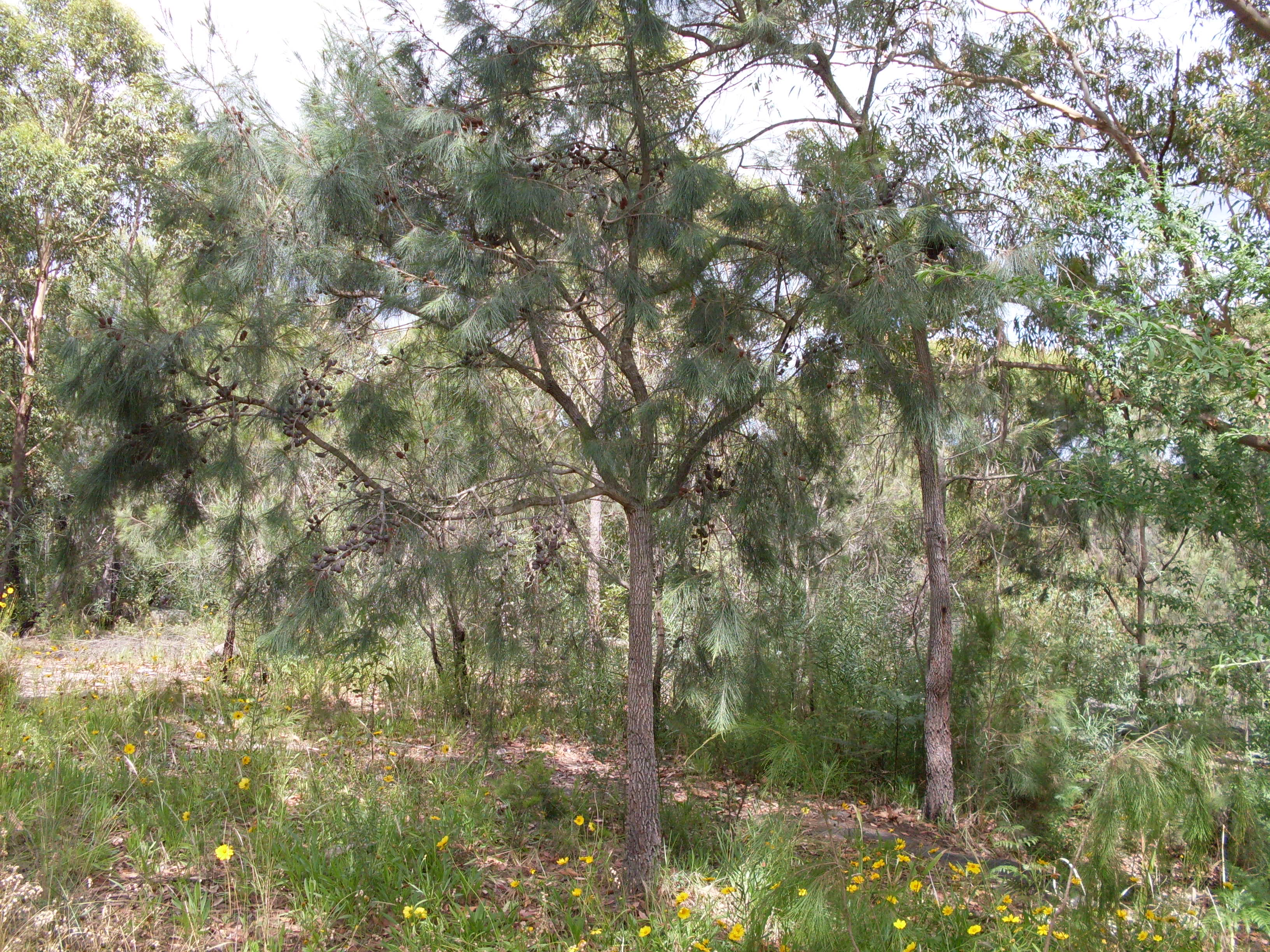
- In Jannali

Scientific classification
- Kingdom: Plantae
- Clade: Tracheophytes
- Clade: Angiosperms
- Clade: Eudicots
- Clade: Rosids
- Order: Fagales
- Family: Casuarinaceae
- Genus: Allocasuarina
- Species: A. distyla

Binomial name
- Allocasuarina distyla (Vent.) L.A.S.Johnson
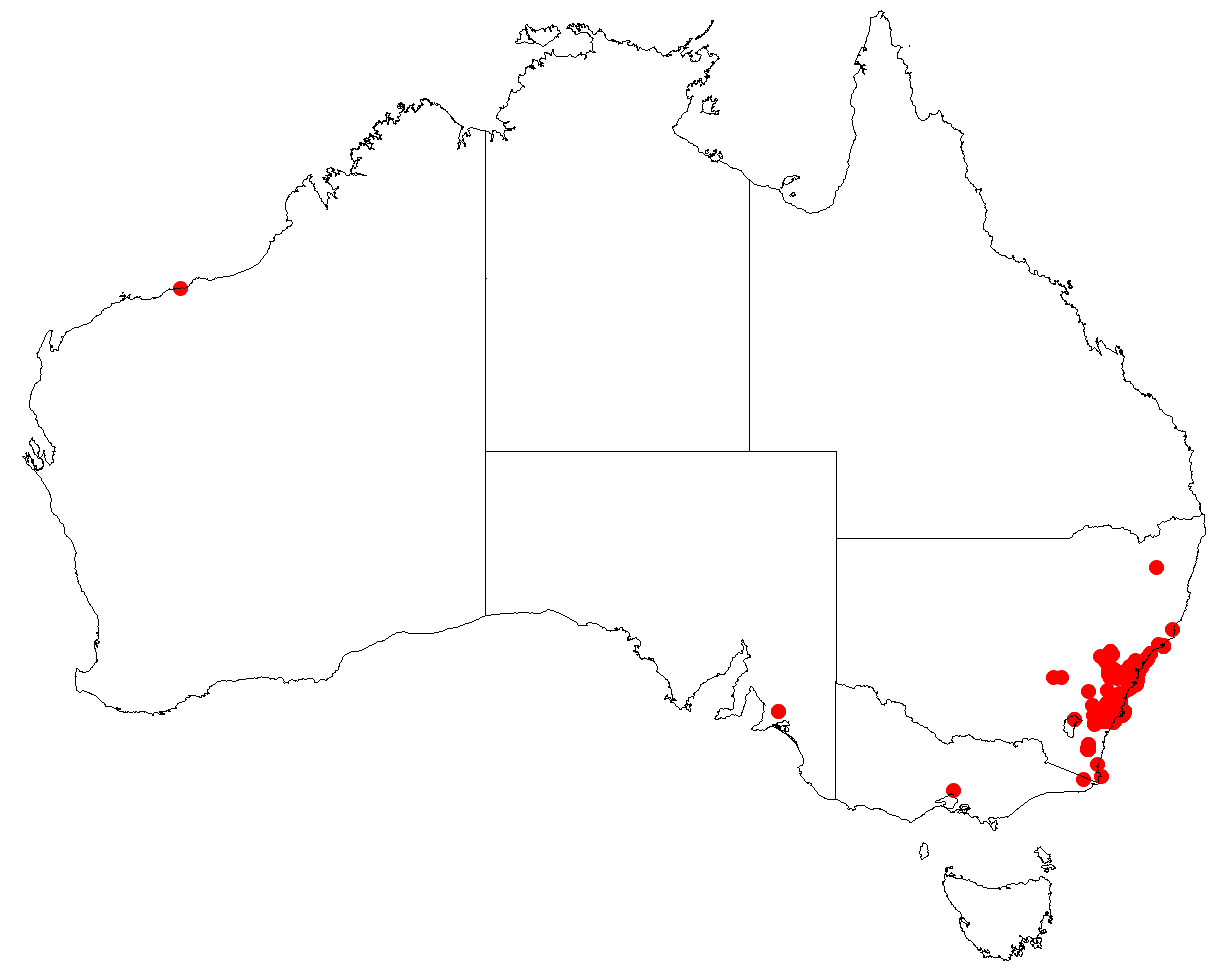
- Occurrence data from AVH

Synonyms
- Casuarina distyla Vent. Casuarina distyla Vent. var. distyla

= Allocasuarina distyla =

Species of flowering plant

Allocasuarina distyla, commonly known as scrub she-oak, is a species of flowering plant in the family Casuarinaceae and is endemic to south-eastern New South Wales. It is a dioecious shrub that has branchlets up to 350 mm (14 in) long, the leaves reduced to scales in whorls of six to eight, the fruiting cones 13–35 mm (0.51–1.38 in) long containing winged seeds (samaras) 4.0–8.0 mm (0.16–0.31 in) long.

== Description ==
Allocasuarina distyla is a dioecious shrub that typically grows to a height of 1–3 m (3 ft 3 in – 9 ft 10 in) and usually has smooth bark. Its branchlets are more or less erect, up to 350 mm (14 in) long, the leaves reduced to erect, scale-like teeth 0.5–1.2 mm (0.020–0.047 in) long, arranged in whorls of six to eight around the branchlets. The sections of branchlet between the leaf whorls (the "articles") are 10–20 mm (0.39–0.79 in) long and 0.8–1.5 mm (0.031–0.059 in) wide. Male flowers are arranged in spikes 15–50 mm (0.59–1.97 in) long, in whorls of 4.5 to 6.5 per centimetre (per 0.39 in.), the anthers 0.8–1.3 mm (0.031–0.051 in) long. Female cones are cylindrical, on a peduncle 2–15 mm (0.079–0.591 in) long or sometimes longer. Mature cones are 13–35 mm (0.51–1.38 in) long and 11–22 mm (0.43–0.87 in) in diameter, the samaras dark brown to black and 4–8 mm (0.16–0.31 in) long.

Hybrids with A. littoralis are common between Broken Bay and Port Hacking.

== Taxonomy ==
This species was first described in 1802 by Étienne Pierre Ventenat who gave it the name Casuarina distyla in his book, Description des Plantes Nouvelles et peu connues, cultivees dans le Jardin de J.M. Cels. It was reclassified in 1982 into the genus Allocasuarina as A. distyla by Lawrie Johnson in the Journal of the Adelaide Botanic Gardens. The specific epithet, (distyla) means "distylous".

== Distribution and habitat ==
Scrub she-oak grows in tall heath on sandstone ridges on the coast of New South Wales between Port Stephens and Eden, and inland as far as Wollemi National Park and Cooma.

== Gallery ==
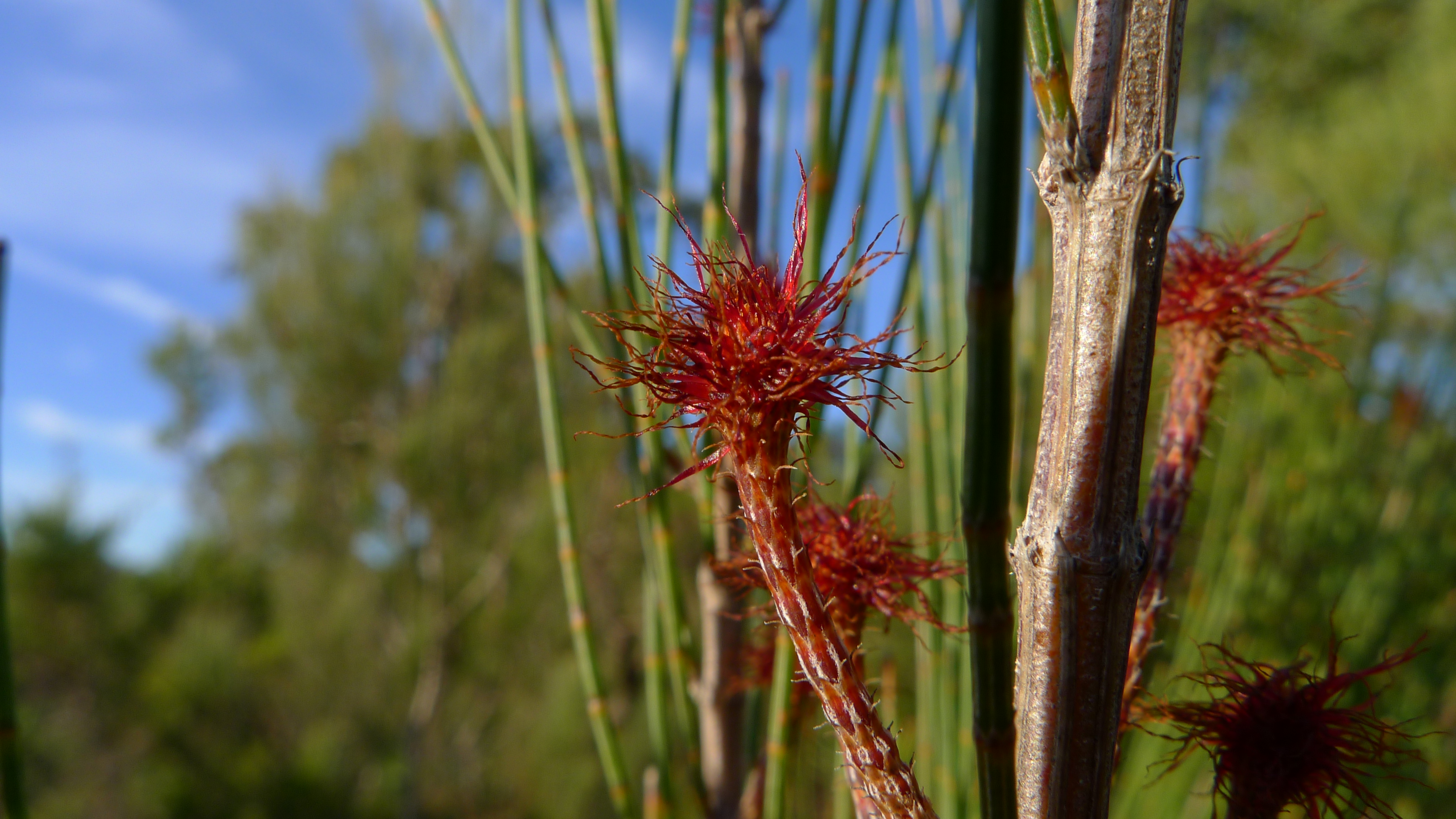
Young female cone

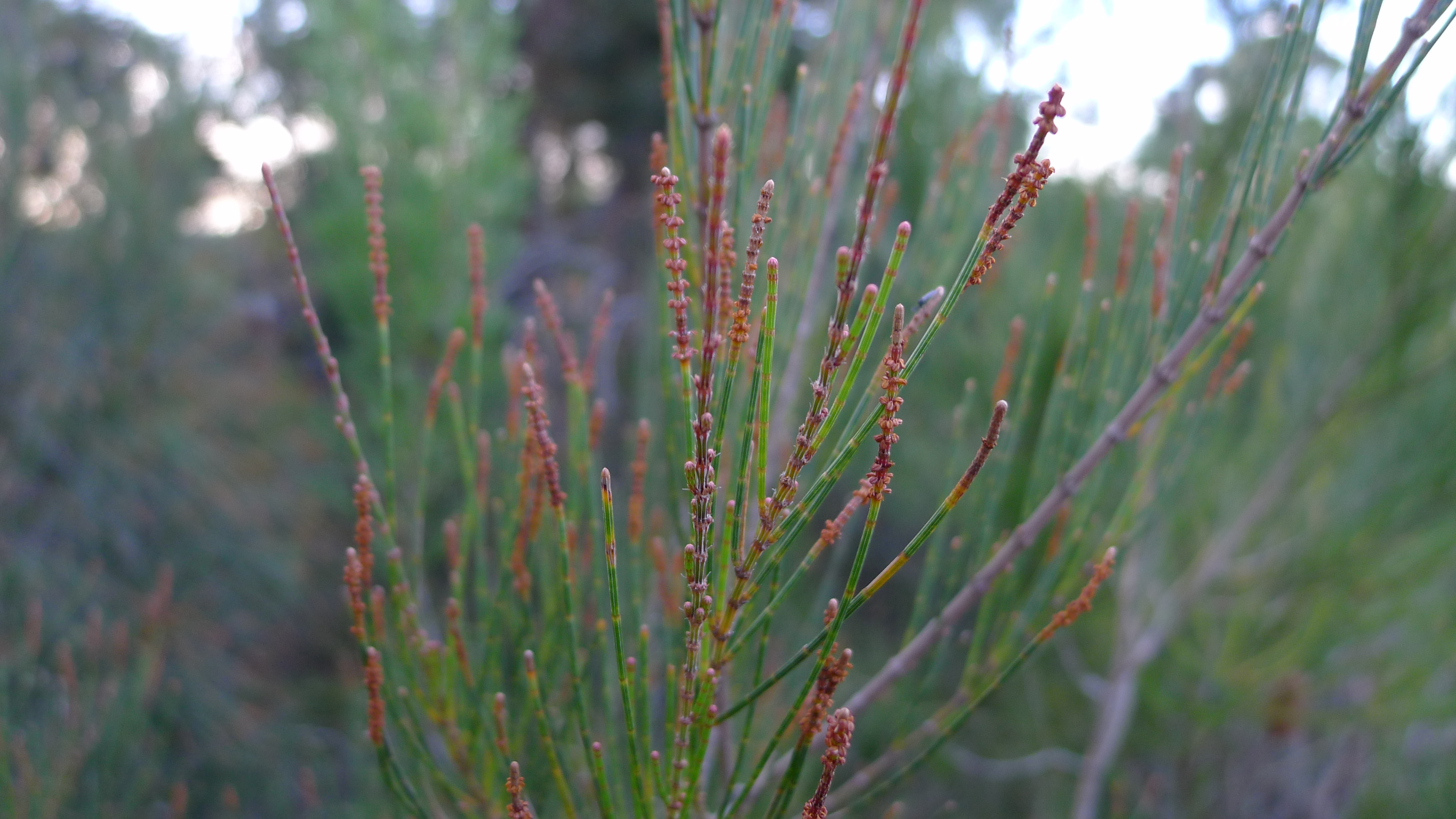
Male spikes

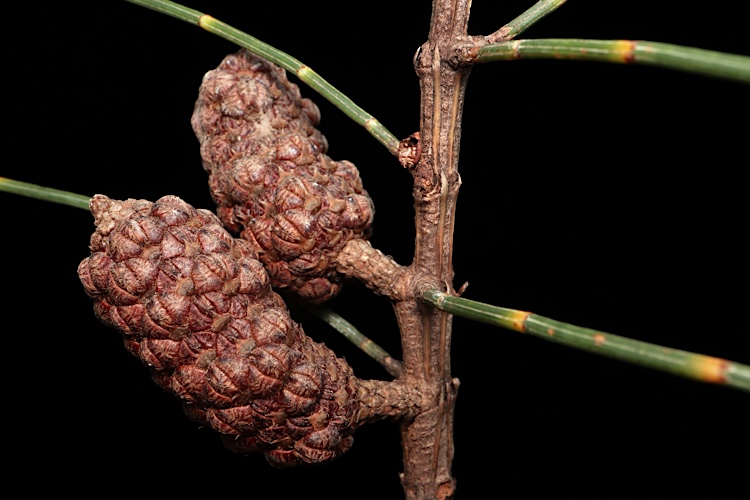
Mature cones
