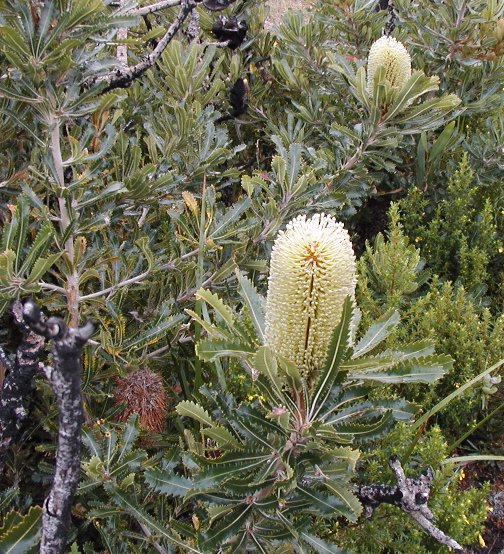
- Wybung Head, Lake Munmorah

Conservation status
- Least Concern (IUCN 3.1)

Scientific classification
- Kingdom: Plantae
- Clade: Embryophytes
- Clade: Tracheophytes
- Clade: Spermatophytes
- Clade: Angiosperms
- Clade: Eudicots
- Order: Proteales
- Family: Proteaceae
- Genus: Banksia
- Species: B. aemula

Binomial name
- Banksia aemula R.Br.

Synonyms
- Banksia elatior R.Br.; Banksia serratifolia auct. non Salisb.

= Banksia aemula =

Wallum banksia

Species of shrub found in eastern Australia

Banksia aemula, commonly known as the wallum banksia, is a shrub of the family Proteaceae. Found from Bundaberg south to Sydney on the Australian east coast, it is encountered as a shrub or a tree to 8 m (26 ft) in coastal heath on deep sandy soil, known as Wallum. It has wrinkled orange bark and shiny green serrated leaves, with green-yellow flower spikes, known as inflorescences, appearing in autumn. The flower spikes turn grey as they age and large grey follicles appear. Banksia aemula resprouts from its woody base, known as a lignotuber, after bushfires.

First described by the botanist Robert Brown in the early 19th century, it derives its specific name 'similar' from its resemblance to the closely related B. serrata. No varieties are recognised. It was known for many years in New South Wales as B. serratifolia, contrasting with the use of B. aemula elsewhere. However, the former name, originally coined by Richard Anthony Salisbury, proved invalid, and Banksia aemula has been universally adopted as the correct scientific name since 1981. A wide array of mammals, birds, and invertebrates visit the inflorescences and are instrumental in pollination; honeyeaters are particularly prominent visitors. Grown as a garden plant, it is less commonly seen in horticulture than its close relative B. serrata.

== Description ==
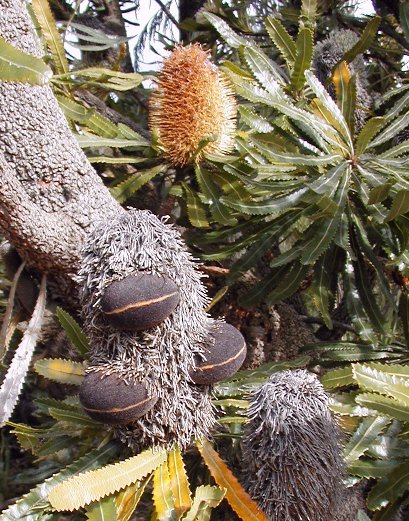
B. aemula, showing large follicles, Cranbourne Annexe, RBG Melbourne

Banksia aemula is generally a gnarled shrub or small tree to 8 m (26 ft), although usually smaller. Conversely, individual wallum banksias have been measured at 8.3–12.1 m (27–40 ft) high, with a maximum diameter at breast height of 44 cm (17 in) in forest on North Stradbroke Island. The trunk has thick orange-brown wrinkled and warty bark, and the new growth is hairy but becomes smooth as it ages. New shoot growth is in spring and summer. The shiny green leaves are obovate to oblong in shape and measure 3–22 cm (1.2–8.7 in) in length, and 1–2 cm (0.4–0.8 in) in width. The leaf ends are truncate and the margins flat and serrated. Flowering is in autumn, from March to June; the green-yellow flower spikes, known as inflorescences, are terminal, found on the ends of branches and emerging from the foliage. Measuring 4 to 20 cm (1.6 to 7.9 in) in height and 8 to 9 cm (3.1 to 3.5 in) in width, they are various shades of pale and greenish yellow. Anywhere from 800 to 1700 individual small flowers arise from a central woody spike (or rachis). Initially tipped with white conical pollen presenters, the flowers open sequentially from the bottom to the top of the flower spike over one to two weeks, in a process known as sequential anthesis. Each flower produces nectar for around seven days after opening. The flower spikes turn grey as they age and up to 25 finely furred grey follicles appear, which can be very large, measuring 3–4.5 cm (1.2–1.8 in) long, 2–3.5 cm (0.8–1.4 in) high, and 2–3.5 cm (0.8–1.4 in) wide. They split open either after bushfire or spontaneously, and release oval seeds 4–4.7 cm (1.6–1.9 in) in length, composed of a wedge-shaped body 1–1.5 cm (0.4–0.6 in) long and 1.1–1.6 cm (0.4–0.6 in) wide, and curved wing 2–3.2 cm (0.8–1.3 in) wide. Banksia aemula resprouts from its woody lignotuber after fire.

Banksia aemula closely resembles B. serrata, but the latter can be distinguished by a greyer, not orange-brown, trunk, and adult leaves wider than 2 cm (0.8 in) in diameter. Inflorescences of serrata are generally a duller grey-yellow in colour, and have longer (2–3 mm), more fusiform (spindle-shaped) or cylindrical pollen presenters tipping unopened flowers. Finally, the follicles are smaller.

== Taxonomy ==
Banksia aemula was called wallum by the Kabi people of the Sunshine Coast, giving rise not only to its common name of wallum banksia but also to the name of the ecological community it grows in. Frederick Manson Bailey reported in 1913 that the indigenous people of Stradbroke Island knew it as mintie. Banyalla is another aboriginal name for the species.

Banksia aemula was collected by Scottish botanist Robert Brown in June 1801 in the vicinity of Port Jackson, and described by him in his 1810 work Prodromus Florae Novae Hollandiae et Insulae Van Diemen. The specific name aemula is Latin for 'similar', referring to its similarity to B. serrata. Brown also collected a taller tree-like specimen from Sandy Cape, which he called Banksia elatior; the specific name is the comparative form of the Latin adjective ēlātus meaning "elevated".

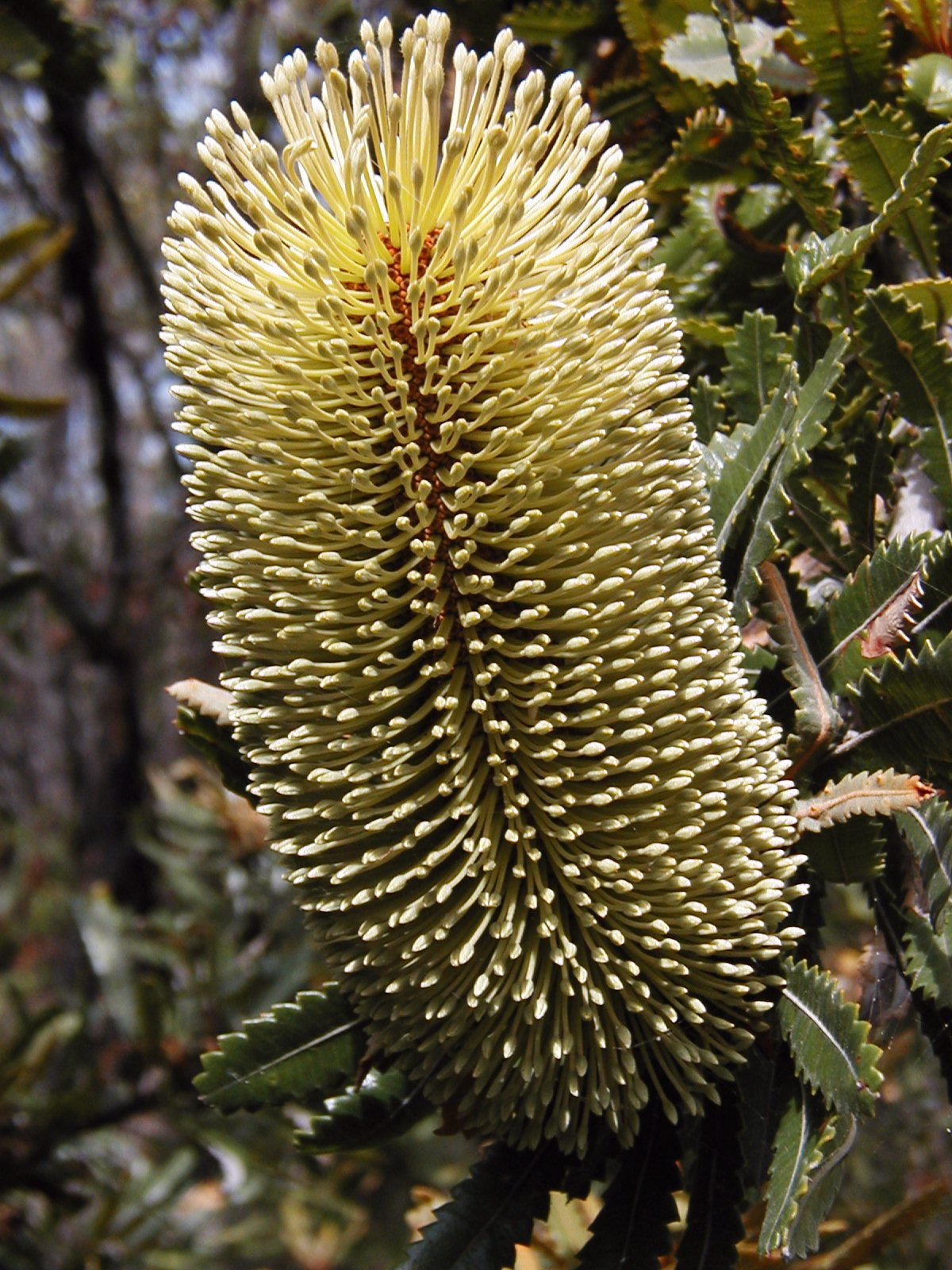
Inflorescence in late bud, showing more conical pollen presenters on the tips of the styles

Under Brown's taxonomic arrangement, B. aemula and B. elatior were placed in subgenus Banksia verae, the "True Banksias", because the inflorescence is a typical Banksia flower spike. Banksia verae was renamed Eubanksia by Stephan Endlicher in 1847, and demoted to sectional rank by Carl Meissner in his 1856 classification. Meissner further divided Eubanksia into four series, with B. aemula placed in series Quercinae on the basis of its toothed leaves. When George Bentham published his 1870 arrangement in Flora Australiensis, he discarded Meissner's series, replacing them with four sections. B. aemula was placed in Orthostylis, a somewhat heterogeneous section containing 18 species. This arrangement would stand for over a century.

In 1921, Karel Domin applied the scientific name Banksia serratifolia to the wallum banksia, and it was often used for the species in New South Wales, but not elsewhere. This name was published by Richard Anthony Salisbury in 1796, making it earlier than B. aemula. However, his description is limited to characters of the leaf, and the original material on which Salisbury based his description has not been found. John White had sent material to James Edward Smith now held in the Linnean Society marked as B. serratifolia Salisb. as well as B. aemula R.Br. The only contemporary specimen labelled B. serratifolia in the Linnaean Herbarium is a branchlet with juvenile leaves which cannot be definitely identified as B. aemula or B. serrata. Salisbury commented in his description of the species that B. serratifolia was very distinct from B. serrata, leading some observers to identify it with B. aemula. Brown, in his description of the latter, included B. serratifolia as a synonym with a question mark, being himself unsure of its identity. However, Salisbury's taxon appeared as Banksia serraefolia in Knight's 1809 work On the cultivation of the plants belonging to the natural order of Proteeae (which was in fact substantially written by Salisbury), and was there reduced to a synonym of B. serrata. Due to this confusion, Salisbury's name was largely ignored. It was adopted by Otto Kuntze in 1891 in his Revisio Generum Plantarum, when he rejected the generic name Banksia L.f., on the grounds that the name Banksia had previously been published in 1776 as Banksia J.R.Forst & G.Forst, referring to the genus now known as Pimelea. Kuntze proposed Sirmuellera as an alternative, referring to this species as Sirmuellera serratifolia. This application of the principle of priority was largely ignored by Kuntze's contemporaries, and Banksia L.f. was formally conserved and Sirmuellera rejected in 1940. George, in 1981, reviewed the history of the name B. serratifolia, and concluded that it was a nomen dubium, which cannot be applied with certainty and should not be used for B. aemula.

=== Placement ===
Alex George published a new taxonomic arrangement of Banksia in his classic 1981 monograph The genus Banksia L.f. (Proteaceae). Endlicher's Eubanksia became B. subg. Banksia, and was divided into three sections. B. aemula was placed in B. sect. Banksia, and this was further divided into nine series, with B. aemula placed in B. ser. Banksia. He thought its closest relative was clearly B. serrata and then B. ornata, and that the three formed a link with western species. Since Brown's original publication had treated all of Fraser's specimens as syntypes (shared type specimens) for the species, George also chose a lectotype (a single specimen to serve as the type specimen).

In 1996, Kevin Thiele and Pauline Ladiges published a new arrangement for the genus, after cladistic analyses yielded a cladogram significantly different from George's arrangement. Thiele and Ladiges' arrangement retained B. aemula in series Banksia, placing it in B. subser. Banksia along with serrata as its sister taxon (united by their unusual seedling leaves) and ornata as next closest relative. This arrangement stood until 1999, when George effectively reverted to his 1981 arrangement in his monograph for the Flora of Australia series.

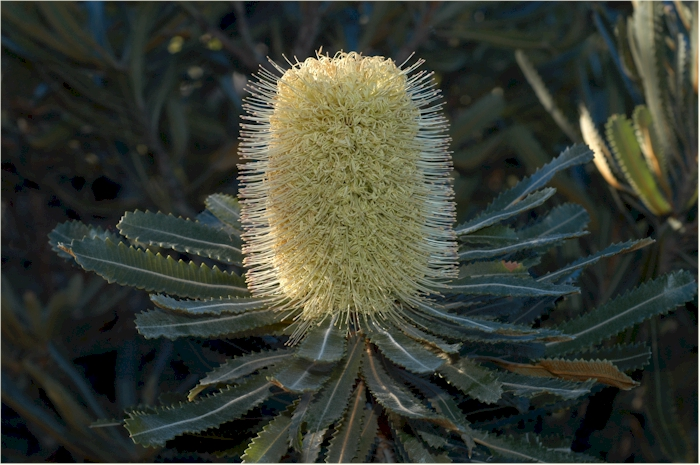
Inflorescence after anthesis, with all flowers fully opened

Under George's taxonomic arrangement of Banksia, B. aemula's taxonomic placement may be summarised as follows:

Genus Banksia

Subgenus Banksia

Section Banksia

Series Banksia

B. serrata
B. aemula
B. ornata
B. baxteri
B. speciosa
B. menziesii
B. candolleana
B. sceptrum

In 2002, a molecular study by Austin Mast again showed the three eastern species to form a group, but they were only distantly related to other members of the series Banksia. Instead, they formed a sister group to a large group comprising the series Prostratae, Ochraceae, Tetragonae (including Banksia elderiana), Banksia lullfitzii and Banksia baueri.

In 2005, Mast, Eric Jones and Shawn Havery published the results of their cladistic analyses of DNA sequence data for Banksia. They inferred a phylogeny greatly different from the accepted taxonomic arrangement, including finding Banksia to be paraphyletic with respect to Dryandra. A new taxonomic arrangement was not published at the time, but early in 2007 Mast and Thiele initiated a rearrangement by transferring Dryandra to Banksia, and publishing B. subg. Spathulatae for the species having spoon-shaped cotyledons; in this way they also redefined the autonym B. subg. Banksia. They foreshadowed publishing a full arrangement once DNA sampling of Dryandra was complete. In the meantime, if Mast and Thiele's nomenclatural changes are taken as an interim arrangement, then B. aemula is placed in B. subg. Banksia.

== Distribution and habitat ==
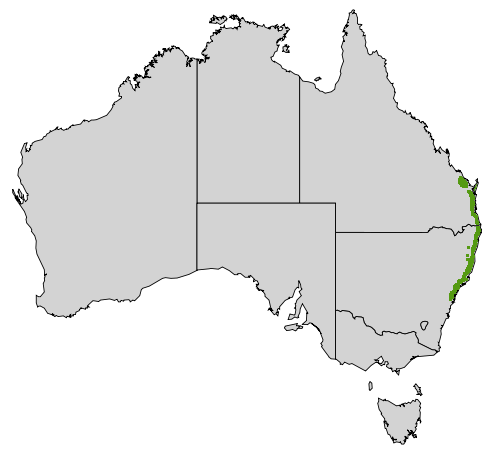
Range of B. aemula

Banksia aemula is found along the east coast of Australia from around 70 km (43 mi) north of Bundaberg in central Queensland down to Sydney. Specifically, its southernmost occurrence is at La Perouse on the northern side of Botany Bay. It is also found on Fraser, Moreton and North Stradbroke Islands. Almost all populations are within a few kilometres of the coast, except for one at Agnes Banks in western Sydney, and two just north and south of Grafton at Coaldale and Glenreagh, and a last around 30 km (19 mi) southwest of Bundaberg.

B. aemula is most commonly found in deep sandy soils, either on dunes or flattish areas which may be seasonally wet. On coastal dunes in southern Queensland, it replaces Banksia serrata, which occupies the same niche to the south. The latter areas, with open woodland or heathland, are known as wallum. In Queensland it is found with B. robur, with the latter species found in flatter wetter areas and B. aemula found on rises. It is also found with B. oblongifolia in Queensland. In some areas of wallum, it may grow as a small tree, along with mallee forms of the red bloodwood (Corymbia gummifera). In Cooloola National Park, it is an occasional emergent plant (along with Melaleuca quinquenervia and Eucalyptus umbra) in closed graminoid heathland, a community of shrubs 0.5–2 m (1.6–6.6 ft) high containing Xanthorrhoea fulva, Empodisma minus, Petrophile shirleyae, and Hakea and Leptospermum species. On the New South Wales Central Coast, it generally grows as a 1–2 m (3.3–6.6 ft) high shrub and is a canopy component of Banksia aemula open heathland, located on coastal headlands on highly leached Pleistocene white sands overlying Triassic and Permian strata. Areas include Wybung Head in Munmorah State Conservation Area, and near Myall Lakes. Other plants it grows in association with include Ricinocarpos pinifolius, Brachyloma daphnoides, Dillwynia glaberrima, D. retorta, Allocasuarina distyla, Bossiaea ensata, Aotus ericoides, Phyllota phylicoides, and Empodisma minus. Sandmining has eradicated much of the community around Redhead. In less leached yellower sands, the community (and B. aemula) is replaced by a taller heath containing B. serrata and B. oblongifolia.

At the southern end of its range, B. aemula is a component of the Eastern Suburbs Banksia Scrub, designated an endangered ecological community. This community is found on younger, windblown sands than the heathlands to the north.

The Agnes Banks Woodland in western Sydney has been recognised by the New South Wales Government as an Endangered Ecological Community. Here Banksia aemula is an understory plant in low open woodland, with scribbly gum (Eucalyptus sclerophylla), narrow-leaved apple (Angophora bakeri) and B. serrata as canopy trees, and B. oblongifolia, Conospermum taxifolium, Ricinocarpus pinifolius, Dillwynia sericea and nodding geebung (Persoonia nutans) as other understory species.

On North Stradbroke Island, B. aemula is one of three canopy tree species of Eucalyptus signata–dominated forest 12–15 m (39–49 ft) high, the third species being E. umbra. This forest is found on a ridge 100 m (330 ft) above sea level formed from an ancient sand dune. Here bracken (Pteridium esculentum) dominates the understory. Other tall shrubs associated include Persoonia cornifolia and Acacia concurrens.

== Ecology ==
Most Proteaceae and all Banksia species, including B. aemula, have proteoid roots, roots with dense clusters of short lateral rootlets that form a mat in the soil just below the leaf litter. These roots are particularly efficient at absorbing nutrients from nutrient-poor soils, such as the phosphorus-deficient native soils of Australia. A study of six wallum species, including B. aemula, found they have adapted to very low levels of phosphorus and are highly sensitive to increased levels of the element, leading to phosphorus toxicity. Some evidence suggests they are efficient at using potassium, and sensitive to calcium toxicity as well. A field study on North Stradbroke Island noted increased root growth in autumn (around April), but that overall root growth was more constant than other species looked at, possibly because its deeper roots had more regular access to groundwater.

A 1998 study in Bundjalung National Park in northern New South Wales found that B. aemula inflorescences are foraged by a variety of small mammals, including marsupials such as yellow-footed antechinus (Antechinus flavipes), and rodents such as pale field rat (Rattus tunneyi), Australian swamp rat (R. lutreolus) and grassland melomys (Melomys burtoni) and even the house mouse (Mus musculus). These animals carry pollen loads comparable to those of nectarivorous birds, making them effective pollinators. Grey-headed flying foxes (Pteropus poliocephalus) were also observed visiting B. aemula and their heads and bellies were noted to contact stigmas while feeding. Bird species that have been observed feeding at the flowers of B. aemula include rainbow lorikeet and scarlet and Lewin's honeyeaters. Several other honeyeaters were recorded on B. aemula inflorescences for The Banksia Atlas, including the New Holland, brown, white-cheeked, and tawny-crowned honeyeaters, noisy miner, little wattlebird and noisy friarbird. The Bundjalung field study found the brown honeyeater carried much higher loads of B. aemula pollen than other species measured, which included white-cheeked and yellow-faced honeyeaters and silvereyes. Insects such as ants and bees (including the introduced honeybee) have also been recorded.

Banksia aemula resprouts from a lignotuber or shoots from epicormic buds after fire. Fire management of B. aemula heath in Southeast Queensland recommends 7- to 20-year fire intervals. Intervals of 10–15 years are recommended for the Eastern Suburbs Banksia Scrub, as longer leads to overgrowth by Leptospermum laevigatum. Experimenting with seed germination and early growth of B. aemula showed that phosphorus was toxic to seedlings, inhibiting growth at double normal soil concentrations and causing seedling death at quadruple normal soil concentrations. The addition of potassium or magnesium ameliorated these effects a little although potassium in high concentrations impacted on growth as well. Overall, seedlings grow slowly over the first 21 weeks of life compared with other plant species, the reasons for which are unclear, although it may be that it offers an increased chance of survival in a nutrient- or water-poor environment. Seed was killed by exposure to 150 °C (302 °F), but survived seven-minute exposure to 100 °C (212 °F).

A study of coastal heaths on Pleistocene sand dunes around the Myall Lakes found B. aemula grew on ridges (dry heath) and B. oblongifolia on slopes (wet heath), and the two species did not overlap. Manipulation of seedlings in the same study area showed that B. aemula grows longer roots seeking water and that seedlings do grow in wet heath, but it is as yet unclear why the species does not grow in wet heath as well as dry heath. Unlike similar situations with banksia species in Western Australia, the two species did not appear to impact negatively on each other. A field study on seedling recruitment conducted at Broadwater National Park and Dirrawong Reserve on the New South Wales North Coast showed that generally B. aemula produced seedlings in low numbers but the attrition rate was low, and that seedlings had a greater survival rate on dry rather than wet heaths. Field work including the experimental planting out of seedlings at Crowdy Bay National Park showed that Banksia aemula seedling roots reach the water table within six months of germination, and that they can germinate in the presence or absence of recent bushfire. The reasons for bradyspory (that is fewer seeds with greater percentage of survival) is unclear, but may be a defence against seed-eating animals. Similarly in field work on North Stradbroke Island, B. aemula was noted to shed its winged seeds over time between (as well as after) fire, and germinate and grow readily with little predation by herbivores.

Two samples of fungus collected from leaves of B. aemula in Noosa, Queensland in 2009 were subsequently described as new species: Toxicocladosporium banksiae in 2010, and Noosia banksiae, representing a new genus, in 2011. Another new fungal species, Saitozyma wallum, was described in 2019 from a B. aemula leaf on the Sunshine Coast, Queensland.

== Cultivation ==
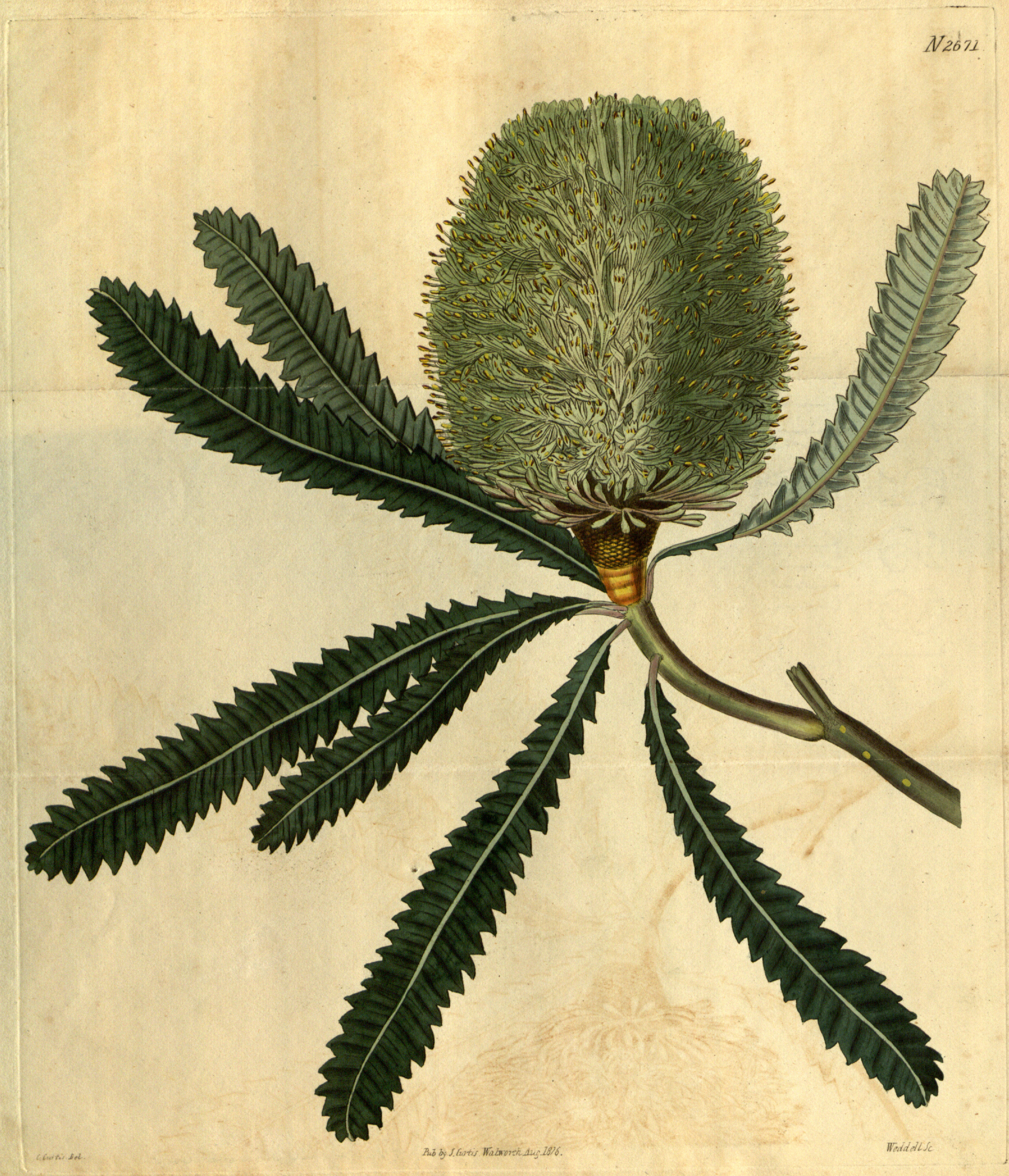
Plate from Curtis's Botanical Magazine, drawn by William J. Hooker, 1826

In 1788, Banksia aemula was one of the first banksias to be cultivated in England, where it was illustrated in Curtis's Botanical Magazine and its rival, The Botanical Register. Its shiny green leaves, showy flower spikes, huge follicles, and wrinkled bark are attractive horticultural features. It is also a bird- and insect-attracting plant.

Trials in Western Australia and Hawaii have shown B. aemula to be resistant to Phytophthora cinnamomi dieback. It requires a well-drained slightly acid (pH 5.5–6.5) soil, preferably fairly sandy and a sunny aspect. Summer watering is also prudent, as it does not suffer water stress well. Slow-growing, the plant takes four to six years to flower from seed. It is less commonly grown than Banksia serrata. An investigation into optimum temperatures for germination found a nighttime temperature of 20–28 °C (68–82 °F), and a daytime of 24–33 °C (75–91 °F) gave best results, and recommended summer planting times.

It has also been used as a rootstock for grafting Banksia speciosa, and has potential in bonsai. The red textured timber has been used in cabinet-making.

== Cultural references ==
Although Banksia attenuata was the common banksia in Australian children's author May Gibbs' own childhood in Western Australia, the old flower spikes of B. aemula with their large follicles are thought to have been the inspiration for the villains of her Snugglepot and Cuddlepie books, the "Big Bad Banksia Men".
