= Cyrioides elateroides =

Scientific classification
- Domain: Eukaryota
- Kingdom: Animalia
- Phylum: Arthropoda
- Class: Insecta
- Order: Coleoptera
- Suborder: Polyphaga
- Infraorder: Elateriformia
- Family: Buprestidae
- Genus: Cyrioides
- Species: C. elateroides

Binomial name
- Cyrioides elateroides (Saunders) 1872

Species of beetle

Cyrioides elateroides is a species of beetle in the family Buprestidae native to southwest Western Australia. It was described by the English entomologist Edward Saunders in 1872, the type specimen collected along the Swan River. Saunders noted it to be similar in coloration to the related C. vittigera but had its markings were patterned differently.
