= Prostrate shrub =

Shrub with a trailing habit

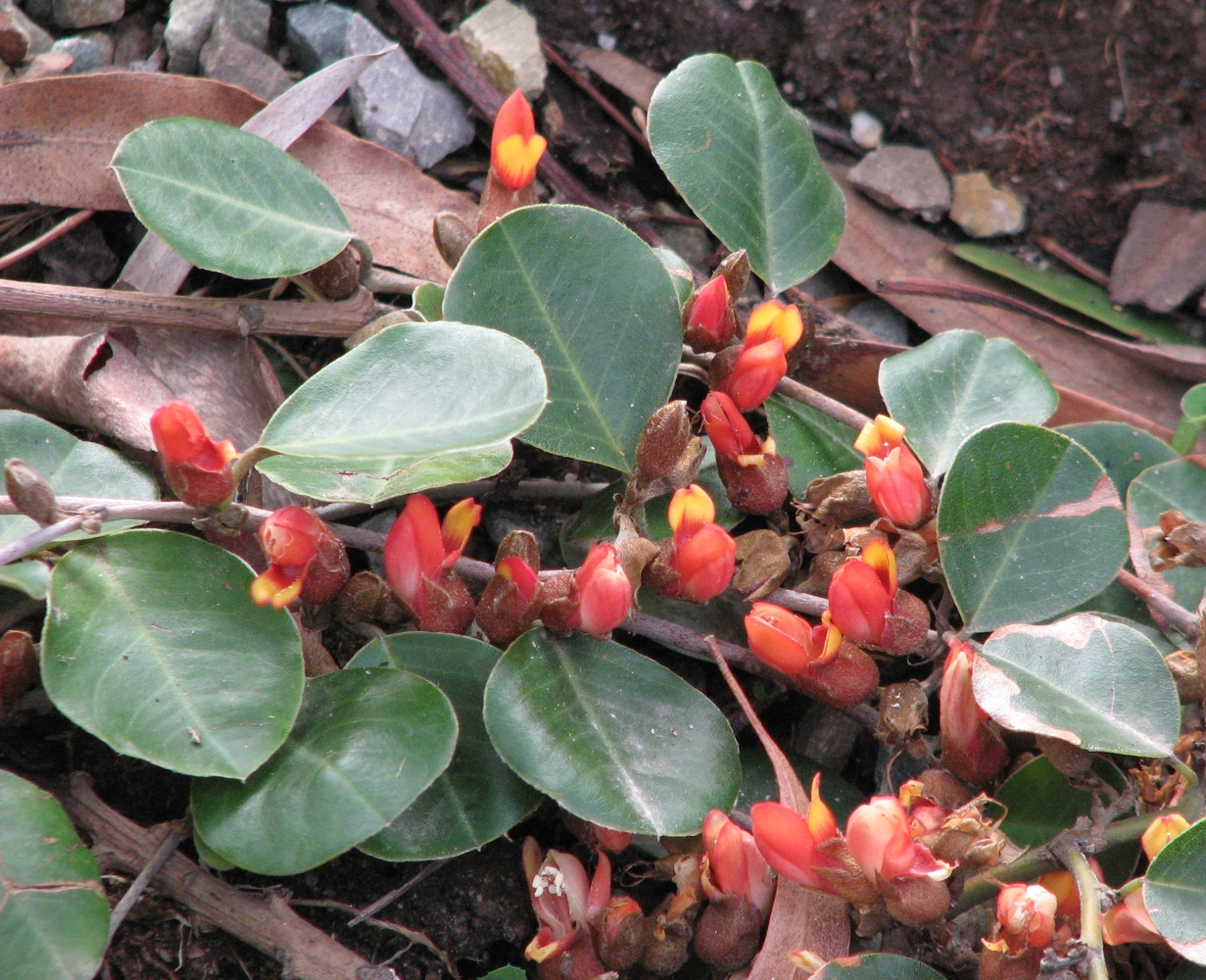
Gastrolobium minus, a prostrate shrub native to Western Australia, popular in horticulture

A prostrate shrub is a woody plant, most of the branches of which lie upon or just above the ground, rather than being held erect as are the branches of most trees and shrubs.

== Background ==
Prostration may occur because the supporting tissues in stems are not strong enough to support the weight of the plant, causing the plant to bend until it reaches the ground. Alternatively, it may occur because of a genetic disposition for branches to grow horizontally on or just under the ground; for example, as a strategy to avoid overly strong sunlight. Finally, environmental factors such as strong winds laden with sand or salt may tend to prune away erect branches, thereby creating a prostrate habit in plants that may not be predisposed to prostration.

== Ecology ==
Prostrate shrubs are used in horticulture as groundcovers and in hanging baskets, and to bind soils and prevent erosion in remedial landscaping. They are also important components of rock gardens. The shrinking size of urban gardens has meant an increase in demand for and desirability of dwarf and prostrate forms of many garden plants. More recently, prostrate shrubs have received attention for their usefulness in planting green roofs and green walls, where they can contribute to environmental conservation.

Prostrate plant forms may arise from deliberate breeding and hybridisation, such as the groundcover grevilleas, including Grevillea "Poorinda Royal Mantle", and G. "Bronze Rambler", or by selection of forms of plants growing in exposed areas. The windswept coastal heathlands and cliffs of far southeastern New South Wales have yielded Banksia 'Roller Coaster' and Banksia 'Pygmy Possum'. These are flattened varieties of less than 0.5 m in height of the species Banksia integrifolia and Banksia serrata, respectively, both of which grow to sizeable trees of 10 m (30 ft) or more in height. The origin of others is unclear; Cootamundra Wattle (Acacia baileyana) is a popular and widely used garden plant in Australia, a prostrate form of which is also in cultivation. Its origin is unknown, possibly a chance seedling in cultivation. It itself is a popular garden plant, its cascading horizontal branches good for rockeries.

=== Species ===
Many species of roses grow as long canes that can spread prostrate on the ground, and some of these have been hybridized to form climbing and rambling roses that can be allowed to grow on the ground without support, as well as varieties known as "carpet roses" that are intended to be grown as ground covers. Prostrate juniper, Juniperus communis subsp. alpina is a naturally occurring form of a popular evergreen. Many species of Cotoneaster, such as C. apiculatus, are prostrate ornamentals, as are the closely related Pyracanthas, and the humilis variant of sweetbox, Sarcococca hookeriana var. humilis. Heaths (Erica carnea and related species) and heathers (Calluna vulgaris) are prostrate shrubs often featured prominently in rock gardens. Wintergreens such as Gaultheria humifusa and Gaultheria procumbens are also prostrate growers.

Although, strictly speaking, herbaceous, the North American bunchberry (Cornus canadensis), a member of the dogwood genus, can appear as a prostrate shrub when growing in the garden. Many daphnes, particularly those derived from Daphne odora, are prostrate growers, including forms that are highly fragrant and have variegated leaves, although they are short-lived. Some forms of the culinary herb rosemary (Rosmarinus officinalis) form prostrate shrubs when grown in Mediterranean climates, although they die back to the ground when grown where winters are colder.

== See also ==
- Cushion plant
- Subshrub
