= Noosia =

Scientific classification
- Kingdom: Fungi
- Division: Ascomycota
- Class: incertae sedis
- Order: incertae sedis
- Family: incertae sedis
- Genus: Noosia; Crous, R.G.Shivas & McTaggart (2011)
- Species: N. banksiae

Binomial name
- Noosia banksiae Crous, R.G.Shivas & McTaggart (2011)
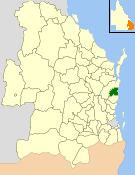
- Known only from Noosa in Queensland, Australia

Genus of fungi

Noosia is a fungal genus in the division Ascomycota. The genus is monotypic, containing the single anamorphic species Noosia banksiae. The fungus is associated with brown leaf spots on the wallum banksia (Banksia aemula), an Australian shrub of the family Proteaceae. The conidia of the fungus are dimorphic. They are initially spherical, smooth and somewhat hyaline; later they become fusoid to ellipsoidal, brown, and covered in small warts. The generic name Noosia refers to the town Noosa, where the type collection was made, in Noosa National Park; the specific epithet refers to the generic name of the host plant.

== See also ==
- List of Ascomycota genera incertae sedis
