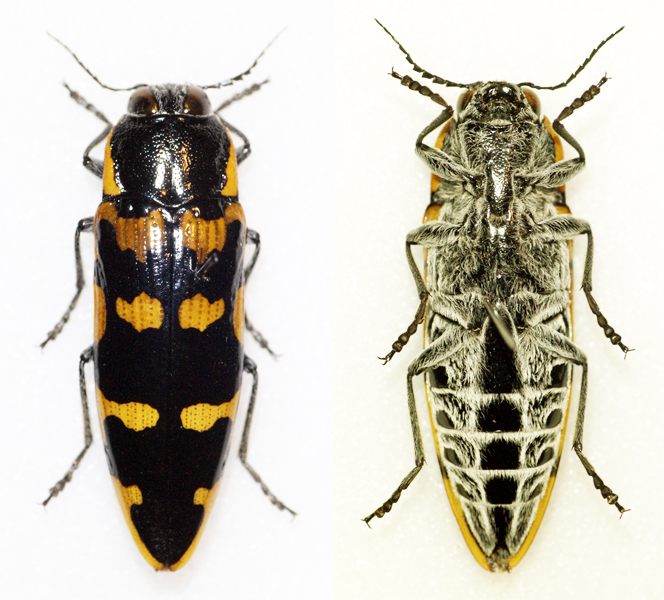
- Cyrioides imperialis

Scientific classification
- Kingdom: Animalia
- Phylum: Arthropoda
- Class: Insecta
- Order: Coleoptera
- Suborder: Polyphaga
- Infraorder: Elateriformia
- Family: Buprestidae
- Subfamily: Buprestinae
- Genus: Cyrioides; Carter, 1920

= Cyrioides =

Genus of beetles

Cyrioides is a genus of beetles in the family Buprestidae, containing the following species:

- Cyrioides australis (Boisduval, 1835) - dark blue banksia jewel beetle (Eastern Australia)
- Cyrioides cincta (Carter, 1908) (Queensland)
- Cyrioides elateroides (Saunders, 1872) (southwest Western Australia)
- Cyrioides imperialis (Fabricius, 1801) - banksia jewel beetle (Eastern Australia and Tasmania)
- Cyrioides sexspilota (Carter, 1920) (Queensland)
- Cyrioides vittigera (Laporte & Gory, 1835) - striped banksia jewel beetle (Western Australia)
