= Cyrioides australis =

Scientific classification
- Domain: Eukaryota
- Kingdom: Animalia
- Phylum: Arthropoda
- Class: Insecta
- Order: Coleoptera
- Suborder: Polyphaga
- Infraorder: Elateriformia
- Family: Buprestidae
- Genus: Cyrioides
- Species: C. australis

Binomial name
- Cyrioides australis (Boisduval) 1835

Species of beetle

Cyrioides australis, commonly known as the dark blue banksia jewel beetle, is a species of beetle in the family Buprestidae native to southeastern Australia. It was described by the French entomologist Jean Baptiste Boisduval in 1835. Banksia integrifolia has been recorded as a host plant.
