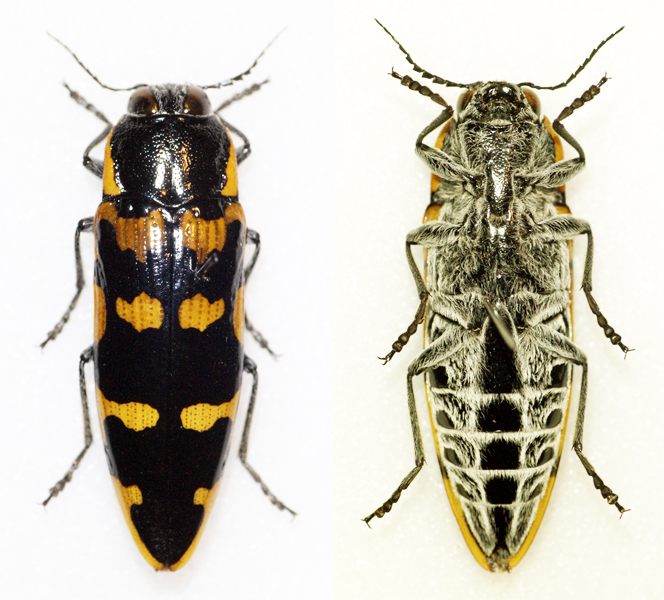

Scientific classification
- Kingdom: Animalia
- Phylum: Arthropoda
- Class: Insecta
- Order: Coleoptera
- Suborder: Polyphaga
- Infraorder: Elateriformia
- Family: Buprestidae
- Genus: Cyrioides
- Species: C. imperialis

Binomial name
- Cyrioides imperialis Fabricius, 1801

= Cyrioides imperialis =

Species of beetle

Cyrioides imperialis, commonly known as the banksia jewel beetle, is a species of beetle in the family Buprestidae native to southeastern Australia. The Danish naturalist Johan Christian Fabricius was the first to describe it in 1801, and it still bears its original name.

The adult measures 3.8 cm (1.5 in) long, and is a gold and black colour with an elongated body. Female beetles lay their eggs in the bark of a tree, after which the larvae hatch and tunnel into the wood. Several species of the genus Banksia, including B. serrata, B. integrifolia and B. marginata are host plants for the larval and adult stages. Other adult host plants recorded include B. spinulosa, Leptospermum polygalifolium, and Isopogon species.
