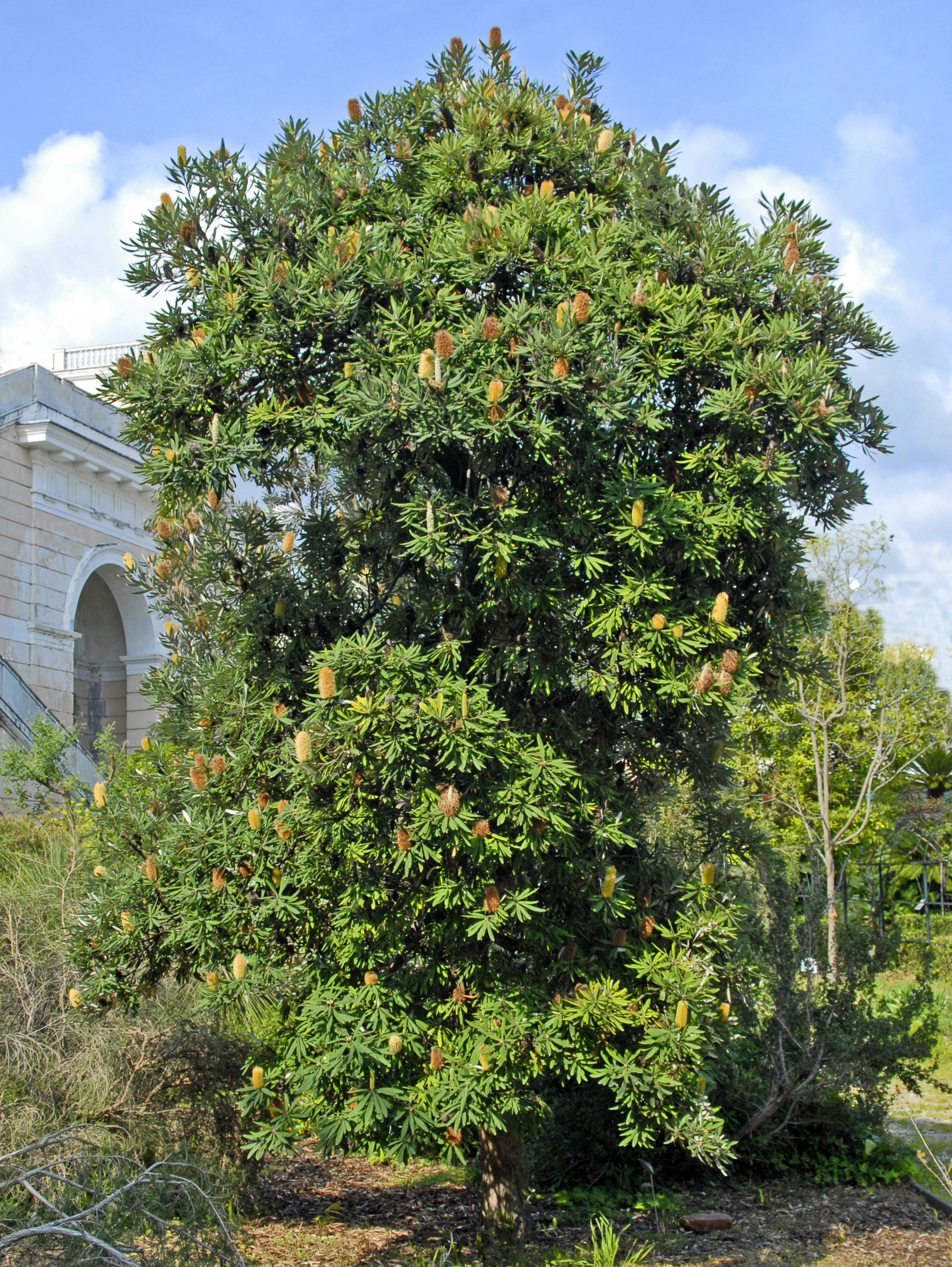
- At Villa Durazzo-Pallavicini

Scientific classification
- Kingdom: Plantae
- Clade: Embryophytes
- Clade: Tracheophytes
- Clade: Spermatophytes
- Clade: Angiosperms
- Clade: Eudicots
- Order: Proteales
- Family: Proteaceae
- Genus: Banksia
- Subgenus: Banksia subg. Banksia
- Section: Banksia sect. Banksia
- Series: Banksia ser. Banksia
- Species: B. serrata

Binomial name
- Banksia serrata L.f.
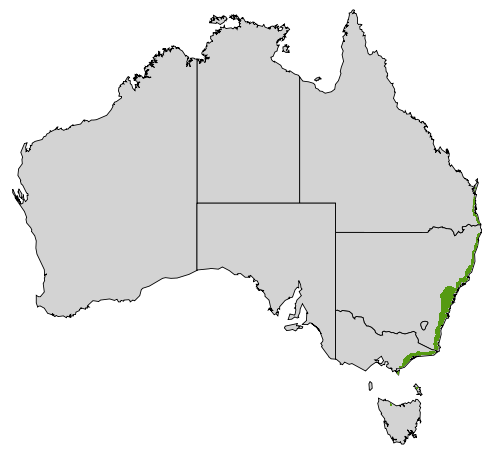
- Range of Banksia serrata in green

Synonyms
- Alphabetical list: Banksia conchifera Gaertn. nom. illeg.; Banksia mitis Knight nom. illeg., nom. superfl.; Banksia serraefolia Knight orth. var.; Banksia serrata var. hirsuta R.T.Baker; Banksia serrata L.f. var. serrata; Banksia serratifolia Salisb.; Banksia serrifolia Knight nom. illeg., nom. superfl.; Banksia undulata Lindl.; Isostylis serrata (L.f.) Britten; Sirmuellera serrata (L.f.) Kuntze; Sirmuellera serratifolia (Salisb.) Kuntze

= Banksia serrata =

Saw banksia

Species of tree native to eastern Australia

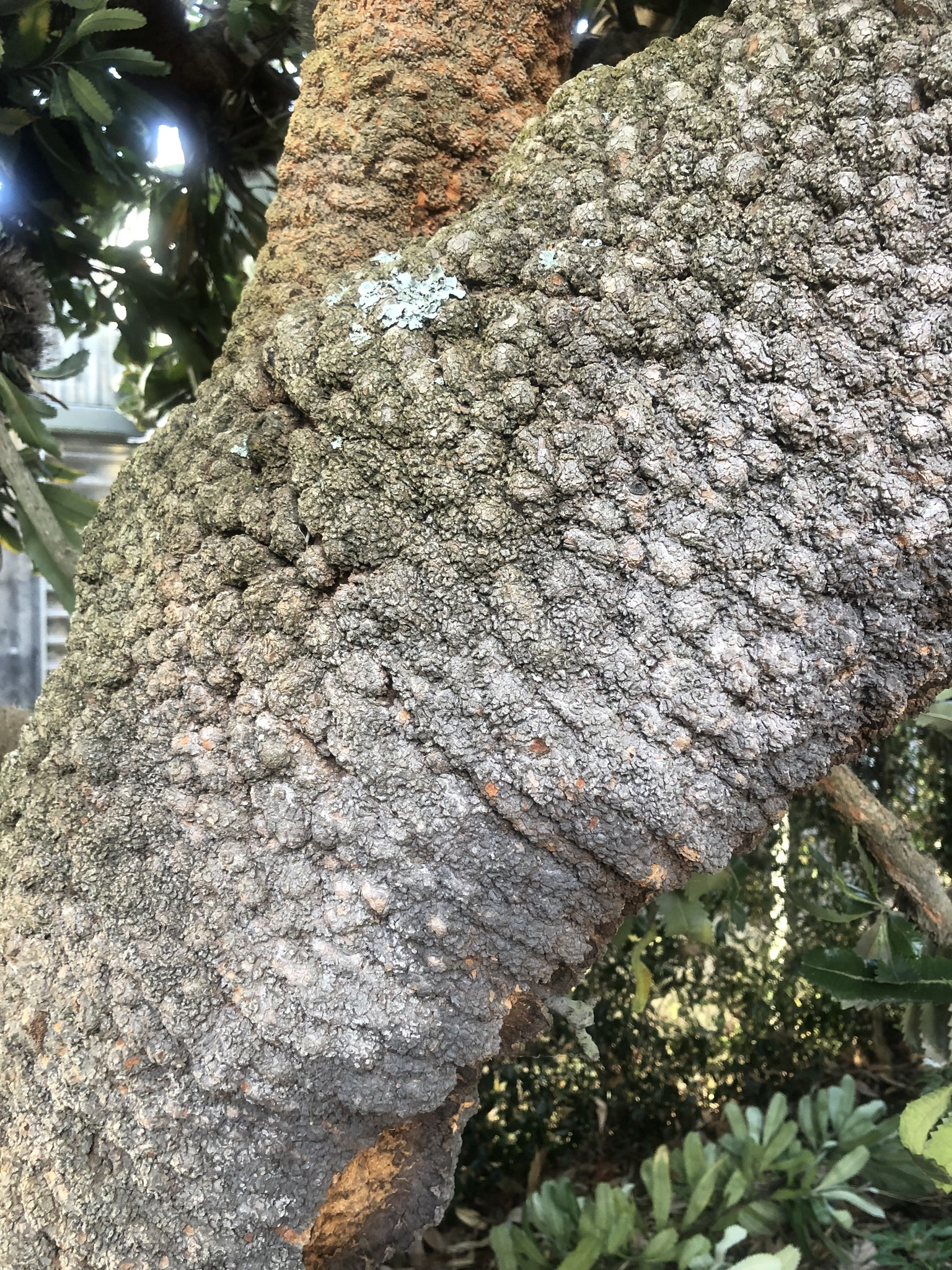
Bark

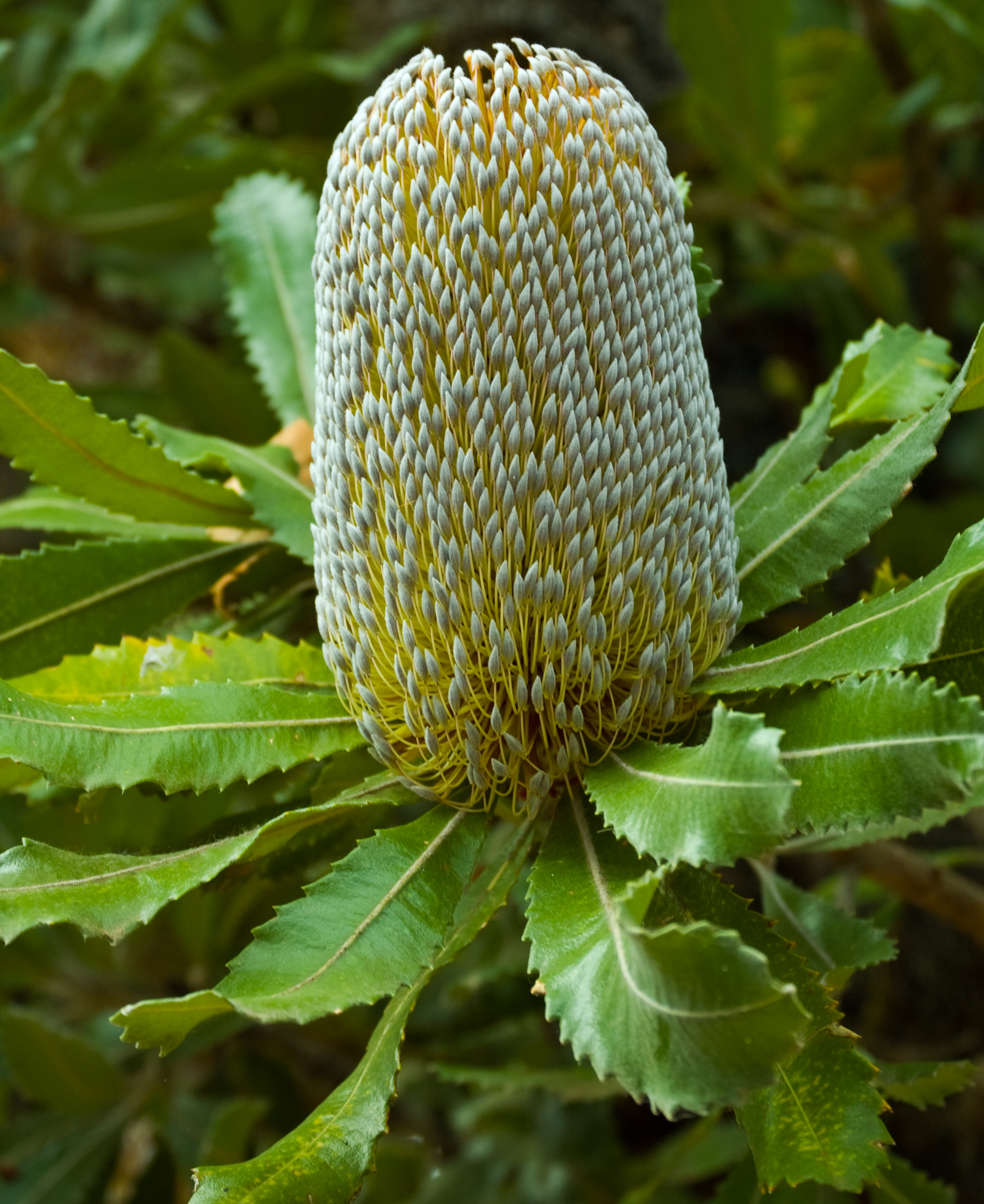
Flowers in late bud, before flowers have opened

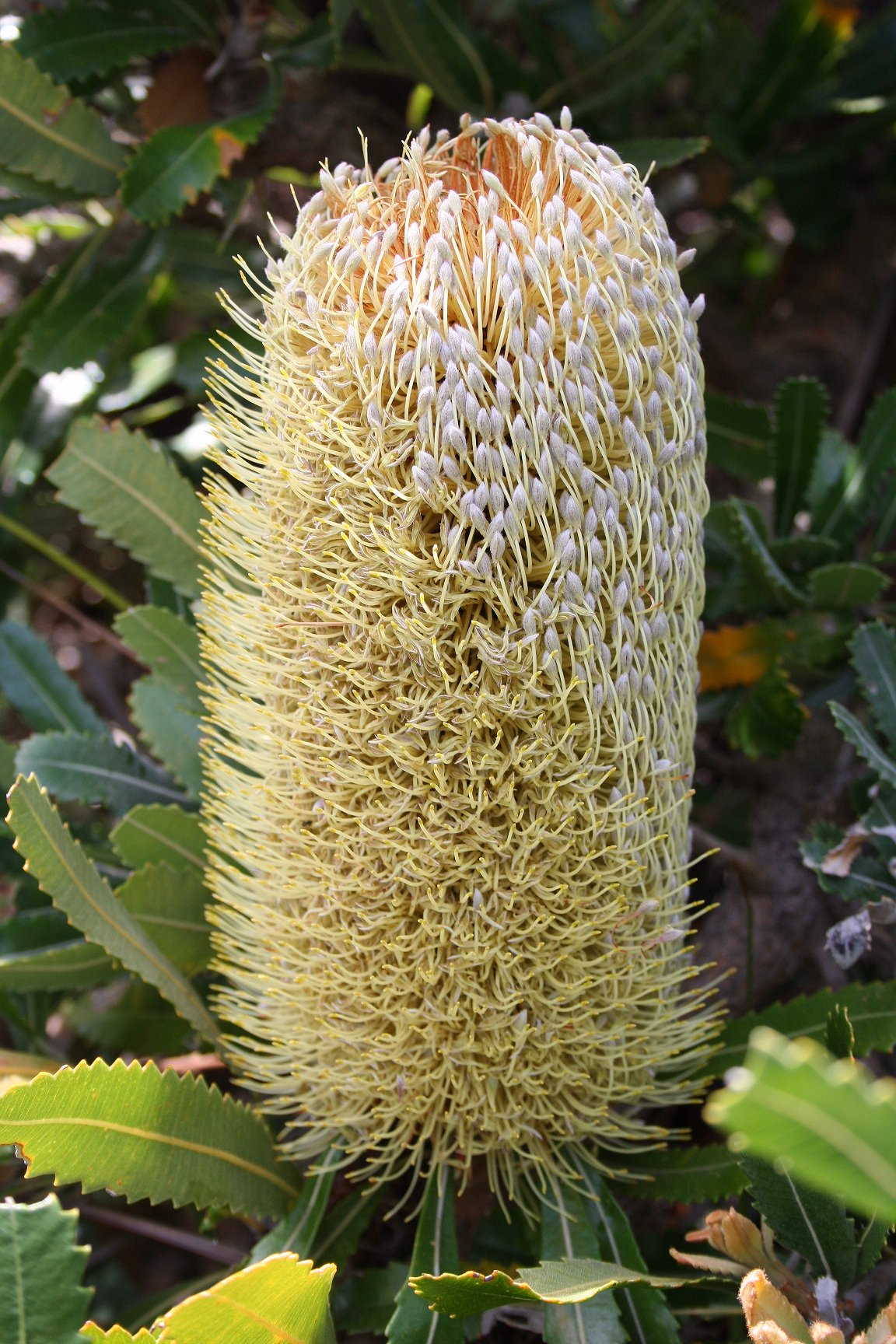
Flower spike in anthesis – flowers opened at bottom of spike (grey-yellow) and unopened at top (cream)

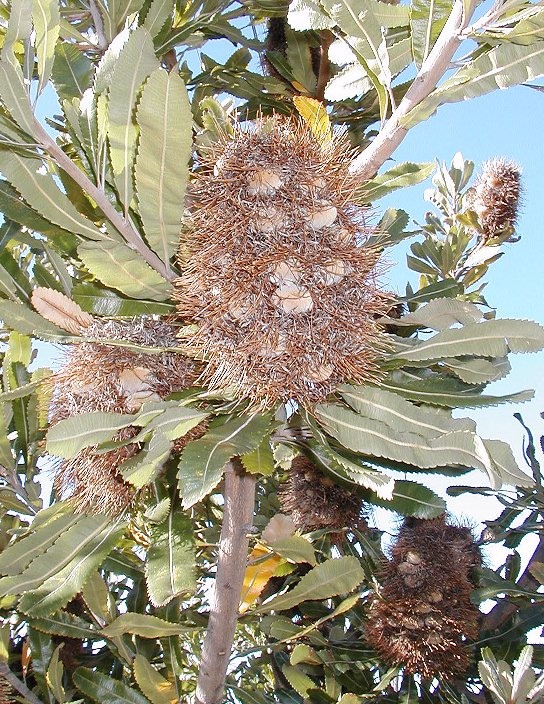
Old cone with large woody follicles

Banksia serrata, commonly known as the saw banksia, the old man banksia, the saw-tooth banksia or the red honeysuckle and as wiriyagan by the Cadigal people, is a species of woody shrub or tree of the genus Banksia, in the family Proteaceae. Native to the east coast of Australia, it is found from Queensland to Victoria with outlying populations on Tasmania and Flinders Island. Commonly growing as a gnarled tree up to 16 m (50 ft) in height, it can be much smaller in more exposed areas. This Banksia species has wrinkled grey bark, shiny dark green serrated leaves and large yellow or greyish-yellow flower spikes appearing over summer. The flower spikes, or inflorescences, turn grey as they age and pollinated flowers develop into large, grey, woody seed pods called follicles.

B. serrata is one of the four original Banksia species collected by Sir Joseph Banks in 1770, and one of four species published in 1782 as part of Carolus Linnaeus the Younger's original description of the genus. There are no recognised varieties, although it is closely related to Banksia aemula. Throughout its range, it grows exclusively in sandy soil, and is usually the dominant plant in scrubland or low woodland. B. serrata is pollinated by and provides food for a wide array of vertebrate and invertebrate animals in the autumn and winter months, and is an important source of food for honeyeaters. It is a common plant of parks and gardens.

== Description ==
Banksia serrata usually grows as a gnarled and misshapen tree up to 16 m (50 ft) tall, although in some coastal habitats it grows as a shrub of 1–3 m (3–10 ft), and on exposed coastal cliffs it has even been recorded as a prostrate shrub. As a tree it usually has a single, stout trunk with warty, knobbly grey bark up to 3 cm (1.2 in) thick. Trunks are often black from past bushfires, and ooze a red sap when injured. New growth appears in spring, summer and autumn. New branchlets are hairy, remaining so for two to three years. Leaves are usually crowded together at the upper end of branches, giving the canopy a thin, sparse appearance. The leaves themselves are dark glossy green above and light green below, 7 to 20 cm (2.8 to 7.9 in)—rarely up to 26 cm (10 in)—long by 2 to 4 cm (0.8 to 1.6 in)—rarely up to 4.5 cm (1.8 in)—wide, and oblong to obovate (egg-shaped) in shape. The leaf margins are serrated, except near the base, with lobes between 1 and 3 mm (0.04 and 0.12 in) deep.

Cylindrical flower spikes, or inflorescences, grow from the ends of 1- to 2-year-old branchlets and have leaves at their base. The spikes are generally 9 to 12 cm (3.5 to 4.7 in) wide with hundreds of individual flowers arising from an upright woody axis. The woody axis is 7 to 15 cm (2.8 to 5.9 in) high and 0.9 to 1 cm (0.35 to 0.39 in) wide. The flowers are cream-grey in colour with cream styles. Old flower spikes develop into "cones" that consist of up to thirty follicles that develop from the flowers that were pollinated. Old withered flower parts remain on the cones, giving them a hairy appearance. Each follicle is oval in shape, wrinkled in texture, covered with fine hair and 2.5–3.5 cm (1.0–1.4 in) long, 2.0–2.5 cm (0.8–1.0 in) thick, and 1.5–2.2 cm (0.6–0.9 in) wide.

The obovate seed is 3–3.4 cm (1.2–1.3 in) long, fairly flattened, has a papery wing and weighs around 77.5 mg (0.0027 oz). The seed is composed of the obovate seed body (containing the embryonic plant), which measures 1.0–1.2 cm (0.39–0.47 in) long by 0.9–1.1 cm (0.35–0.43 in) wide. One side, termed the outer surface, is pitted and dark brown and the other is brown-black and warty, sparkling slightly. The seeds are separated in the follicle by a sturdy dark brown seed separator, which is about the same shape as the seeds, with a depression where the seed body sits adjacent to it. The first pair of leaves (called cotyledons) produced by seedlings are obovate, dull green and measure 1–1.4 cm (0.39–0.55 in) long by 1–1.5 cm (0.4–0.6 in) wide. The auricle at the base of the cotyledon leaf is pointed and measures 0.2 cm (0.08 in) long. The hypocotyl is thick, hairy and red. The cotyledons are linear to lance-shaped with the narrow end towards the base, 3.5–10 cm (1.4–3.9 in) long with serrated margins and a v-shaped sinus at the tip. Banksia serrata closely resembles B. aemula, but the latter can be distinguished by an orange-brown, rather than greyish, trunk, and adult leaves narrower than 2 cm (0.8 in). The inflorescences of B. serrata are generally a duller grey-yellow in colour, have longer (2–3 mm), more fusiform or cylindrical pollen presenters on the tips of unopened flowers and the follicles are smaller.

== Taxonomy ==
Banksia serrata was first collected at Botany Bay on 29 April 1770, by Sir Joseph Banks and Daniel Solander, naturalists on the British vessel HMS Endeavour during Lieutenant (later Captain) James Cook's first voyage to the Pacific Ocean. Solander coined the (unpublished) binomial name Leucadendrum serratifolium, with Leucadendron serratum also appearing under the finished drawing in Banks' Florilegium. The first formal description of the species was not published until April 1782, when Carolus Linnaeus the Younger described the first four Banksia species in his Supplementum Plantarum, commenting that it was the showiest species in the genus. As the first named species of the genus, Banksia serrata is considered the type species. Banksia serrata has the common names of old man banksia, saw banksia, saw-toothed banksia and saw-leaved banksia. It is also known as red honeysuckle and red banksia from the colour of its timber. The Cadigal people who lived in the Sydney region prior to the arrival of Europeans, called the plant wiriyagan.

German botanist Joseph Gaertner described Banksia conchifera in 1788 in the first volume of his work De Fructibus et Seminibus Plantarum. Alex George noted this description was taken from Linnaeus' original and was hence a nomen illegitimum (illegitimate name). Joseph Knight described Banksia mitis and Banksia serræfolia in his 1809 On the cultivation of the plants belonging to the natural order of Proteeae, both later determined to be B. serrata and hence superfluous. In 1830, John Lindley wrote of a plant in cultivation in England with short wavy leaves in Edwards's Botanical Register, giving it the name Banksia undulata "wavy-leaved banksia" but conceding it may have been a variety of B. serrata.

Under Brown's taxonomic arrangement, B. serrata was placed in subgenus Banksia verae, the "true banksias", because the inflorescence is a typical Banksia flower spike. Banksia verae was renamed Eubanksia by Stephan Endlicher in 1847, and demoted to sectional rank by Carl Meissner in his 1856 classification. Meissner further divided Eubanksia into four series, placing B. serrata in series Quercinae on the basis of its toothed leaves. When George Bentham published his 1870 arrangement in Flora Australiensis, he discarded Meissner's series, replacing them with four sections. B. serrata was placed in Orthostylis, a somewhat heterogeneous section containing 18 species.

In 1891, Otto Kuntze, in his Revisio Generum Plantarum, rejected the generic name Banksia L.f., on the grounds that the name Banksia had previously been published in 1776 as Banksia J.R.Forst & G.Forst, referring to the genus now known as Pimelea. Kuntze proposed Sirmuellera as an alternative, referring to this species as Sirmuellera serrata. For the same reason, James Britten transferred the species to the genus Isostylis as Isostylis serrata in 1905. These applications of the principle of priority were largely ignored, and Banksia L.f. was formally conserved and Sirmuellera rejected in 1940.

=== Current placement ===
Alex George published a new taxonomic arrangement of Banksia in his 1981 monograph "The genus Banksia L.f. (Proteaceae)". Endlicher's Eubanksia became B. subg. Banksia, and was divided into three sections. B. serrata was placed in B. sect. Banksia, and this was further divided into nine series, placing B. serrata in B. ser. Banksia (formerly Orthostylis). (Note: George's 1981 publication of B. ser. Orthostylis was invalid, as the inclusion of B. serrata, meant that it was required under the International Code of Botanical Nomenclature to be given the autonym Banksia L.f. ser. Banksia . This has been recognised and corrected in later publications.)

In 1996, Kevin Thiele and Pauline Ladiges published a new arrangement for the genus, after cladistic analyses yielded a cladogram significantly different from George's arrangement. Thiele and Ladiges' arrangement retained B. serrata in series Banksia, placing it in B. subser. Banksia along with B. aemula as its sister taxon (united by their unusual seedling leaves) and B. ornata as its next closest relative. This arrangement stood until 1999, when George effectively reverted to his 1981 arrangement in his monograph for the Flora of Australia series.

Under George's taxonomic arrangement of Banksia, B. serrata is placed in the Genus Banksia, Subgenus Banksia, Section Banksia and Series Banksia along with B. aemula, B. ornata, B. baxteri, B. speciosa, B. menziesii, B. candolleana and B. sceptrum.

In 2002, a molecular study by Austin Mast again showed that the three eastern species formed a natural group, or clade, but they were only distantly related to other members of the series Banksia. Instead, they formed a sister group to a large group comprising the series Prostratae, Ochraceae, Tetragonae (including Banksia elderiana), Banksia lullfitzii and Banksia baueri.

In 2005, Mast, Eric Jones and Shawn Havery published the results of their cladistic analyses of DNA sequence data for Banksia. They inferred a phylogeny greatly different from the accepted taxonomic arrangement, including finding Banksia to be paraphyletic with respect to Dryandra. A new taxonomic arrangement was not published at the time, but early in 2007 Mast and Thiele initiated a rearrangement by transferring Dryandra to Banksia, and publishing B. subg. Spathulatae for the species having spoon-shaped cotyledons; in this way they also redefined the autonym B. subg. Banksia. They foreshadowed publishing a full arrangement once DNA sampling of Dryandra was complete. In the meantime, if Mast and Thiele's nomenclatural changes are taken as an interim arrangement, then B. serrata is placed in B. subg. Banksia.

=== Intraspecific variation ===
Banksia serrata is a fairly uniform species, showing little variation between different habitats other than occasionally occurring as a shrub in coastal areas. No subspecific taxa are recognised. In 1896, Richard Thomas Baker found a clump of B. serrata at Kelgoola on the Central Tablelands with large leaves, with hairs on leaves and stems, further west of any other collection of the species. He named it B. serrata var. hirsuta. In his 1981 monograph, George was unable to locate a collection that corresponded with the report.

== Distribution and habitat ==
Banksia serrata occurs on the Australian mainland from Wilsons Promontory, Victoria (39°08′ S), in the south, to Maryborough, Queensland (25°31′ S), in the north. There is also a large population at Sisters Creek in Tasmania and another in the southwest corner of the Wingaroo Nature Reserve in the northern part of Flinders Island. The Wingaroo NR Conservation Plan (2000) reports that the population comprises around 60 to 80 individual trees, the majority of which are believed to be "quite old". It adds that there is evidence of slow and continuous regeneration, which appears to be occurring in the absence of fire.

Throughout its range, B. serrata is found on well-drained sandy soils that are low in nutrients, and it is often found on stabilised soil near the coast just behind the main dune system. In the Sydney region it is found with other typical woodland species, including yellow bloodwood (Corymbia eximia), red bloodwood (C. gummifera), silvertop ash (Eucalyptus sieberi), blue-leaved stringybark (E. agglomerata) and Sydney peppermint (E. piperita).

In the Upper Myall River region, B. serrata grows in dry sclerophyll forest on sandy soils that have recently formed (in the Holocene) or in shallow soils over differing substrates, while its close relative B. aemula grows in dry heath forest that occurs on ancient Pleistocene sands not disturbed in 125,000 years. In intermediate communities both species are found.

B. serrata is a component of the Eastern Suburbs Banksia Scrub (ESBS), designated an endangered ecological community. This community is found on windblown sands, which are younger than the heathlands to the north.

== Ecology ==
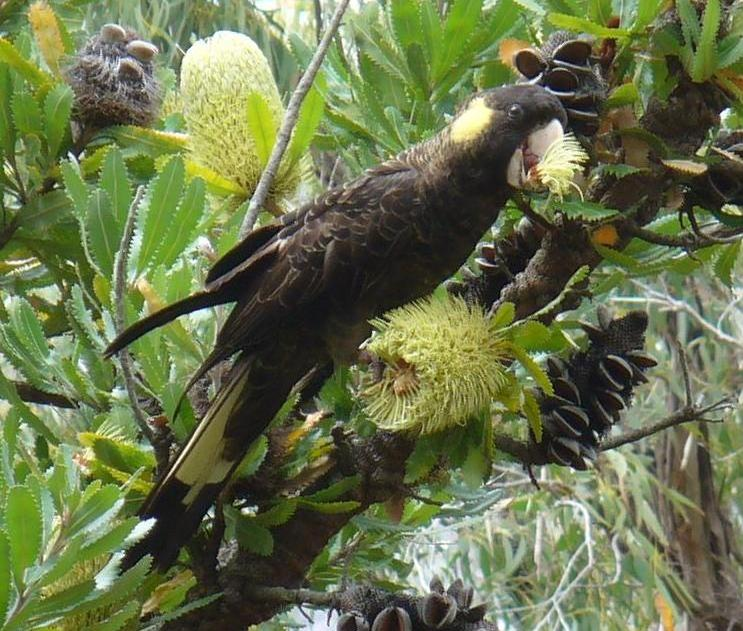
Yellow-tailed black cockatoo at flowers

This species is a food source for several bird species. Nectar-eating birds that have been observed feeding at the flowers include bell miner (Manorina melanophrys), noisy miner (M. melanocephala), white-cheeked honeyeater (Phylidonyris nigra), New Holland honeyeater (P. novaehollandiae), crescent honeyeater (P. pyrrhopterus), white-eared honeyeater (Nesoptilotis leucotis), brown honeyeater (Lichmera indistincta), tawny-crowned honeyeater (Gliciphila melanops), white-naped honeyeater (Melithreptus lunatus), white-plumed honeyeater (Ptilotula penicillata), yellow-tufted honeyeater (Lichenostomus melanops), eastern spinebill (Acanthorhynchus tenuirostris), red wattlebird (Anthochaera carunculata), little wattlebird (A. chrysoptera), noisy friarbird (Philemon corniculatus), spangled drongo (Dicrurus bracteatus), and rainbow lorikeet (Trichoglossus moluccanus). The immature follicles are eaten by yellow-tailed black cockatoo (Zanda funerea).

A 1988 field study found that most flowers of B. serrata opened at night, and recorded the brown antechinus (Antechinus stuartii), sugar glider (Petaurus breviceps), eastern pygmy possum (Cercartetus nanus), and bush rat (Rattus fuscipes) as nocturnal mammalian visitors and pollinators. Other mammals recorded eating the flowers include the grey-headed flying fox (Pteropus poliocephalus), little red flying fox (P. scapulatus) and common blossom bat (Syconycteris australis). Banksia serrata is a host plant for the larval and adult stages of the banksia jewel beetle (Cyrioides imperialis). Native bees and European honey bees visit the flowers.

Banksia serrata has a central taproot and few lateral roots. Clusters of fine branched proteoid roots up to 15 cm (6 in) long arise from larger roots. These roots are particularly efficient at absorbing nutrients from nutrient-poor soils, such as the phosphorus-deficient native soils of Australia.

Banksia serrata has shown a variable susceptibility to dieback from the pathogen Phytophthora cinnamomi, the plants in sandier soils showing more resistance than those in heavier soils. Plants from Wilsons Promontory were sensitive. The resistance of plants from Flinders Island is unknown. The small size of the stand renders it vulnerable to eradication.

=== Response to fire ===
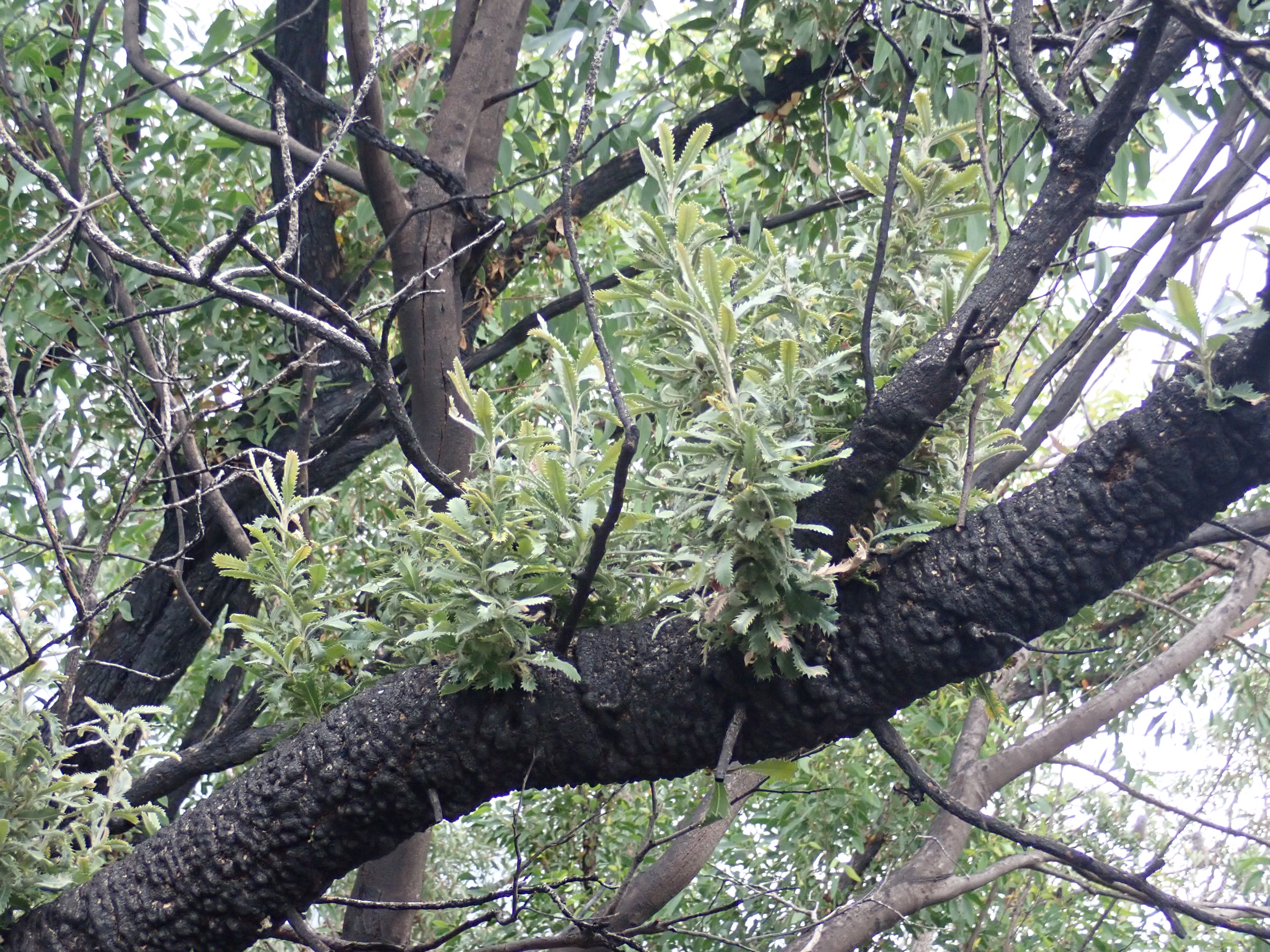
Epicormic regrowth after bushfire

Banksia serrata plants generally become fire tolerant by five to seven years of age in that they are able to resprout afterwards. Regrowth is generally from epicormic buds under their thick bark if the plant is between 2 and 6 m (7–20 ft) high or possibly from the woody subterranean base known as the lignotuber of younger and smaller plants. There is doubt as to whether recovery from a lignotuber is possible, although it has been demonstrated in other Banksia species such as B. menziesii. Stem size is a critical factor; stems with a DBH of under 1 cm (0.4 in) are unable to withstand low intensity fires. A stem/trunk DBH of 2 cm (0.8 in) is needed to survive low intensity fires and of around 5 cm (2 in) to withstand a high intensity fire.

As with other species in the genus, B. serrata trees are naturally adapted to the presence of regular bushfires and exhibit a form of serotiny known as pyriscence. The seedbank in the plant's canopy is released after bushfire. Fire intervals of 10 to 15 years are recommended for the Eastern Suburbs Banksia Scrub, as longer leads to overgrowth by coastal tea tree (Leptospermum laevigatum), while an interval of at least nine years was indicated in a study at Brisbane Water National Park. Repeated intervals of five years' duration or less will result in decline of population as young plants are not yet resistant to fire, and their tall habit makes them especially vulnerable. The seedbank is most productive between 25 and 35 years after a previous fire, although seedlings may be outcompeted by seedlings of obligate seeder species. A field study found that seeds were dispersed up to 4 m (13 ft) from the parent plant in an hour by strong wind.

Seeds are also released spontaneously in the absence of fire. The degree to which B. serrata trees exhibit bradyspory seems to depend on the nature of the site where they grow. One study recorded plants at coastal sites having more than 30% of their follicles open, compared to those further inland having fewer than 5% open. Follicles also open when part of the tree dies.

== Uses ==
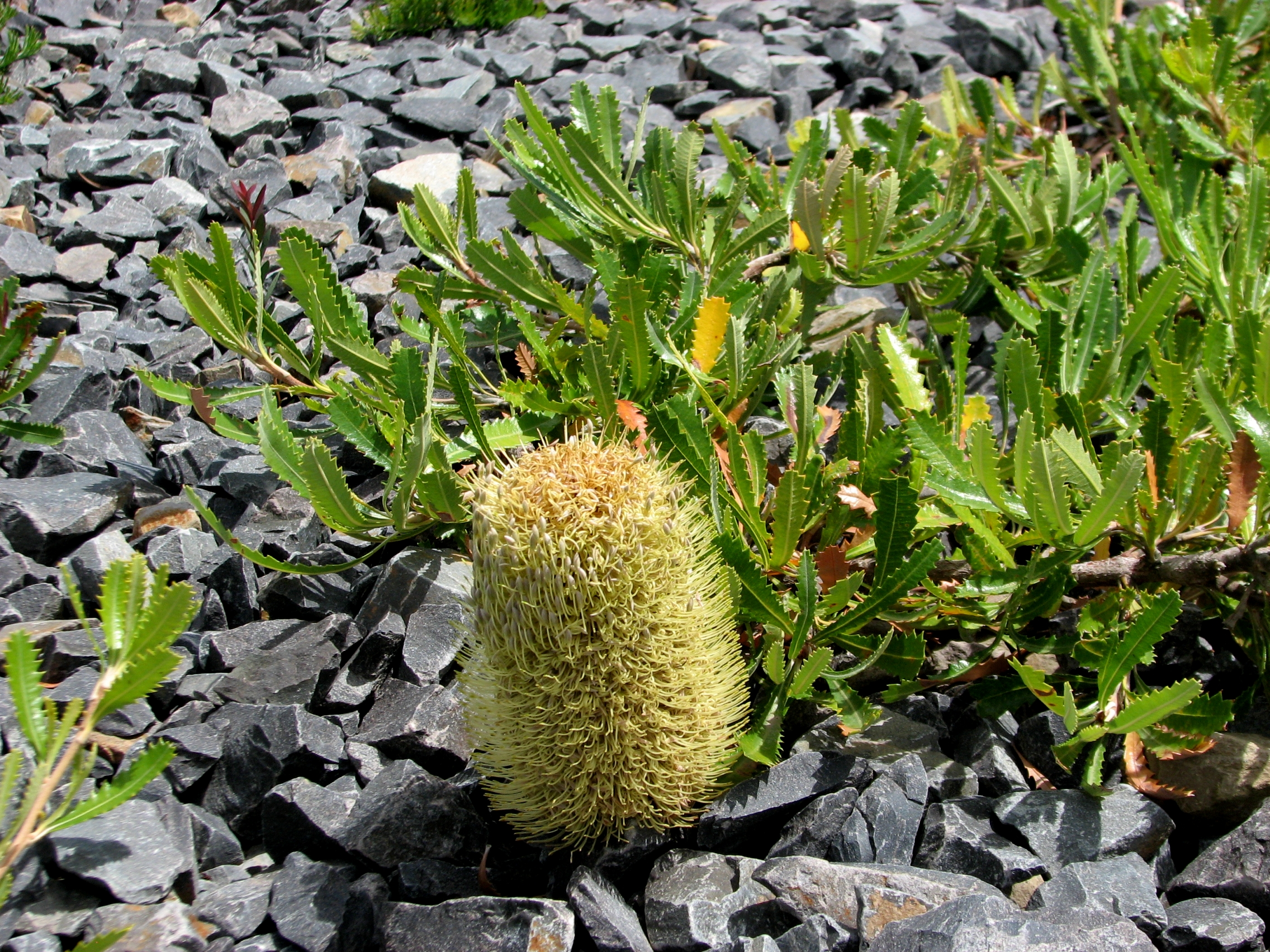
Banksia 'Pygmy Possum' at the Royal Botanic Gardens, Cranbourne

=== Use in horticulture ===
The gnarled lumpy bark, saw-toothed leaves and silvery-yellow spikes in bud are horticultural features of B. serrata. It can be grown readily from seed, collected after heating the "cone". A sterile, free-draining seed-raising mixture prevents damping off. In cultivation, though relatively resistant to P. cinnamomi dieback, it grows best in a well-drained soil, preferably fairly sandy with a pH from 5.5 to 7.5, and a sunny aspect. Summer watering aids in growth. The plant may take several years to flower, although plants grown from cuttings may flower in two years. Banksia serrata is also used in bonsai.

=== Use in construction ===
Red-pink in colour, the timber resembles English oak. It has been used in boatbuilding and is strong, durable and distinctively patterned.

=== Cultivars ===
- Banksia 'Pygmy Possum' – first propagated by Austraflora Nursery, this is a prostrate form originally from the Green Cape area on the New South Wales far south coast. Similar plants are seen in nurseries called simply B. serrata (Prostrate) collected from the same area. This plant is suitable for rockeries and small gardens.
- Banksia 'Superman' – selection from large-flowered (spikes to 27 cm (11 in) high) and large-leaved population from Scotts Head on New South Wales mid north coast. As yet, it is not in commercial cultivation, though is registered with ACRA.
