= Banksia 'Superman' =

Cultivar of Banksia spinulosa

- Species: Banksia serrata
- Cultivar: 'Superman'
- Origin: Nambucca Heads, New South Wales, Australia

Banksia 'Superman', also known by its extended cultivar name Banksia serrata 'Superman', is a registered Banksia cultivar. It was discovered by Maria Hitchcock of Armidale, NSW near Nambucca in 1986 during the Banksia Atlas project. An attempt to have it accorded subspecies rank was not successful so she named it 'Superman' to describe the giant inflorescences and leaves and in keeping with the common name for Banksia serrata (saw banksia). Its leaves and inflorescences are mostly twice the size of typical plants of its parent species, Banksia serrata. Naturally occurring close to running water or on poorly drained sites between Nambucca Heads and Grassy Head in New South Wales, it grows true to seed.

It has not yet been introduced into commercial cultivation but seed has been distributed among members of the Australian Plants Society. Specimens have been growing successfully in the Armidale district for more than 15 years and in Canberra. The variety is frost hardy especially when it achieves some height but it is only moderately drought hardy. It has a short warty trunk and thick branches. The upright and terminal inflorescences which occur on short thickened stems off the branches are grey in bud and up to 25 cm x 12 cm in size. The yellow styles emerge in a spiral at the bottom of the inflorescence and gradually cover the whole inflorescence. Lorikeets and other birds are attracted to the nectar. The fruiting cone is covered with dead brown styles and has prominent follicles which contain one or two large seeds with black papery wings separated by a woody spacer. Cones need to be heated in a fire or oven for the follicles to open. The tree drops leaves continually creating a layer of mulch.
