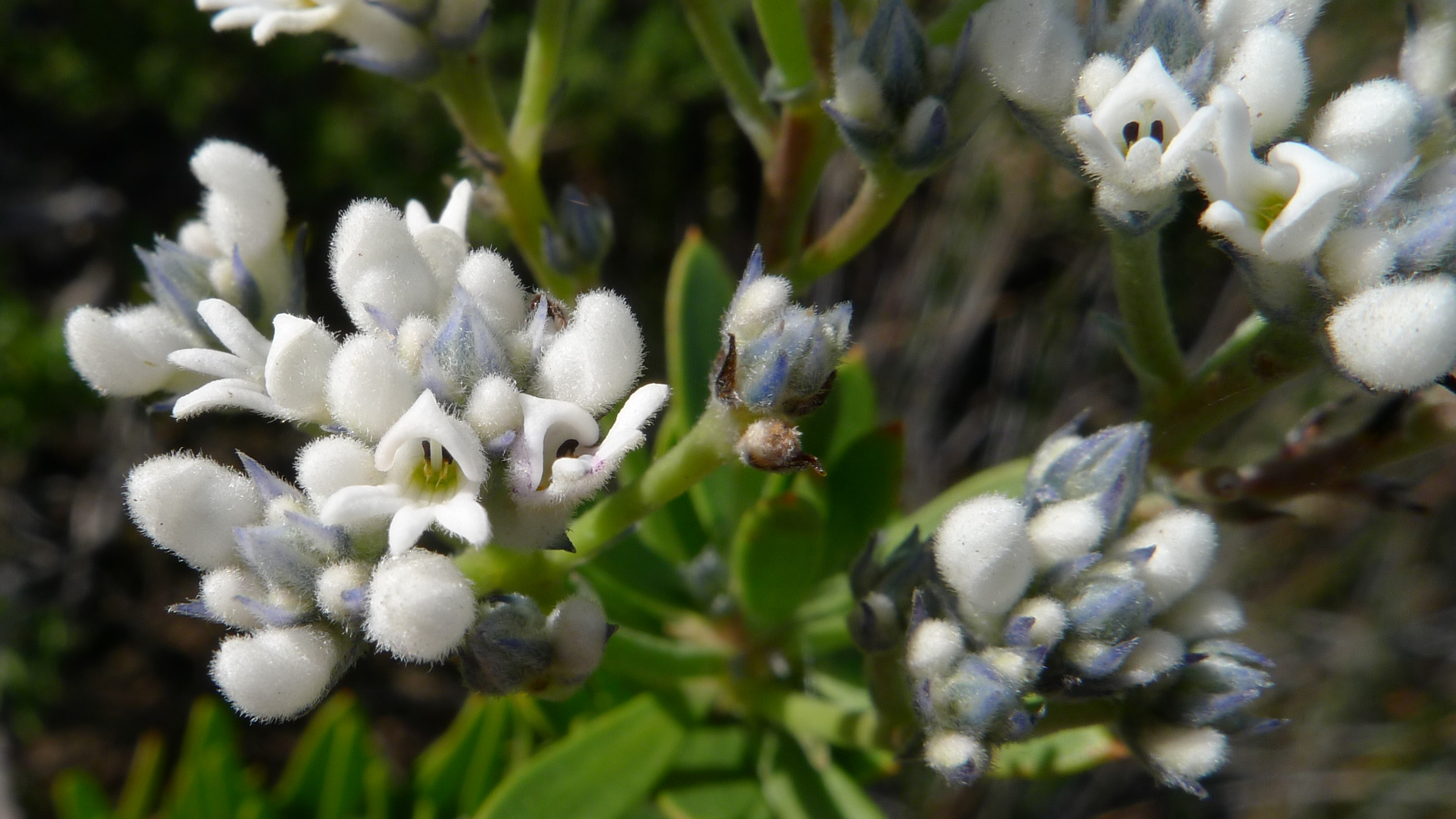

Scientific classification
- Kingdom: Plantae
- Clade: Tracheophytes
- Clade: Angiosperms
- Clade: Eudicots
- Order: Proteales
- Family: Proteaceae
- Genus: Conospermum
- Species: C. taxifolium

Binomial name
- Conospermum taxifolium C.F.Gaertn.

Synonyms
- List: Conospermum affine Schult. & Schult.f.; Conospermum falcifolium Knight; Conospermum lanceolatum R.Br.; Conospermum lavandulifolium A.Cunn. ex Meisn.; Conospermum linifolium A.Cunn. ex Meisn.; Conospermum propinquum R.Br.; Conospermum spicatum R.Br.; Conospermum taxifolium Sm. nom. illeg., nom. superfl.; Conospermum taxifolium var. brownii Meisn.; Conospermum taxifolium var. lanceolatum (R.Br.) Benth.; Conospermum taxifolium var. lavandulifolium (A.Cunn. ex Meisn.) Domin; Conospermum taxifolium var. linifolium (A.Cunn. ex Meisn.) Benth.; Conospermum taxifolium var. smithii Meisn. nom. illeg., nom. superfl.; Conospermum taxifolium C.F.Gaertn. var. taxifolium

= Conospermum taxifolium =

Variable smoke-bush

Species of Australian shrub

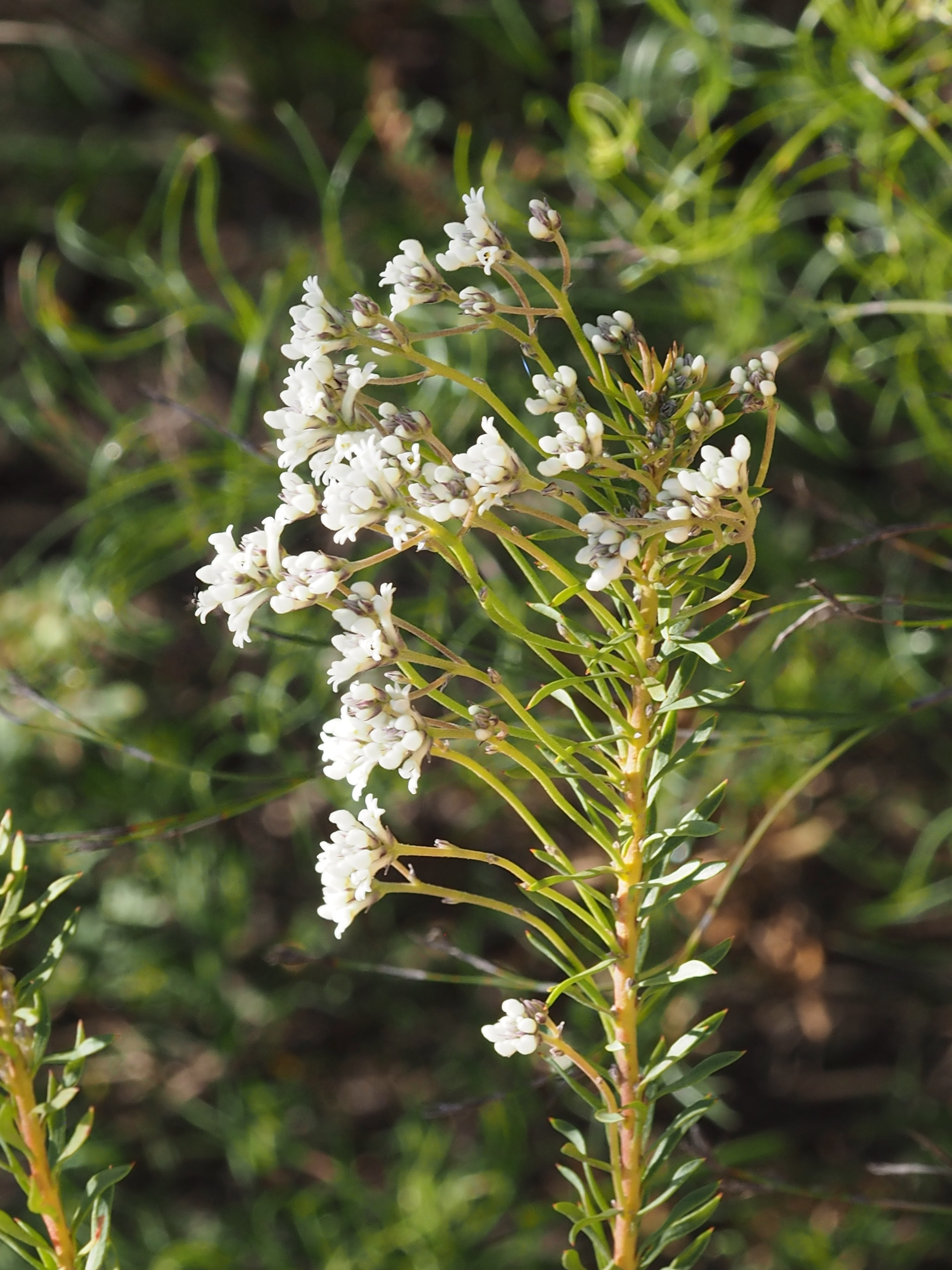
Habit in Sherwood Nature Reserve

Conospermum taxifolium, commonly known as variable smoke-bush, yew-leaf smoke bush or paint brush, is a plant in the family Proteaceae and is endemic to eastern Australia. It is an erect shrub with narrow elliptic to narrow egg-shaped leaves with the narrower end towards the base and panicles of cream-coloured to white, tube-shaped flowers.

== Description ==
Conospermum taxifolium is an erect shrub with rod-like branches and that typically grows to a height of up to 1.5 m (4 ft 11 in). It has spreading to erect, twisted narrow elliptic to narrow egg-shaped leaves with the narrower end towards the base, 5–30 mm (0.20–1.18 in) long and 1–3 mm (0.039–0.118 in) wide. The flowers are arranged in panicles 10–30 mm (0.39–1.18 in) wide on the ends of branches or in leaf axils, on peduncles 10–30 mm (0.39–1.18 in) long. The flowers are sessile with a bluish bract about 3 mm (0.12 in) long at the base. The flowers are tube-shaped with white to cream-coloured tepals 6–7 mm (0.24–0.28 in) long and hairy on the outside. The upper lip of the flower is sac-like and the lower lip has three lobes. Flowering occurs from August to November and the fruit is a hairy nut 2–3 mm (0.079–0.118 in) long.

== Taxonomy ==
Conospermum taxifolium was first formally described in 1807 by Karl Friedrich von Gaertner in Joseph Gaertner's book, Supplementum Carpologicae.

== Distribution and habitat ==
Variable smoke-bush grows in heath and woodland on the coast and nearby ranges, sometimes further inland, and is widespread from southern Queensland through eastern New South Wales to the far eastern corner of Victoria.
