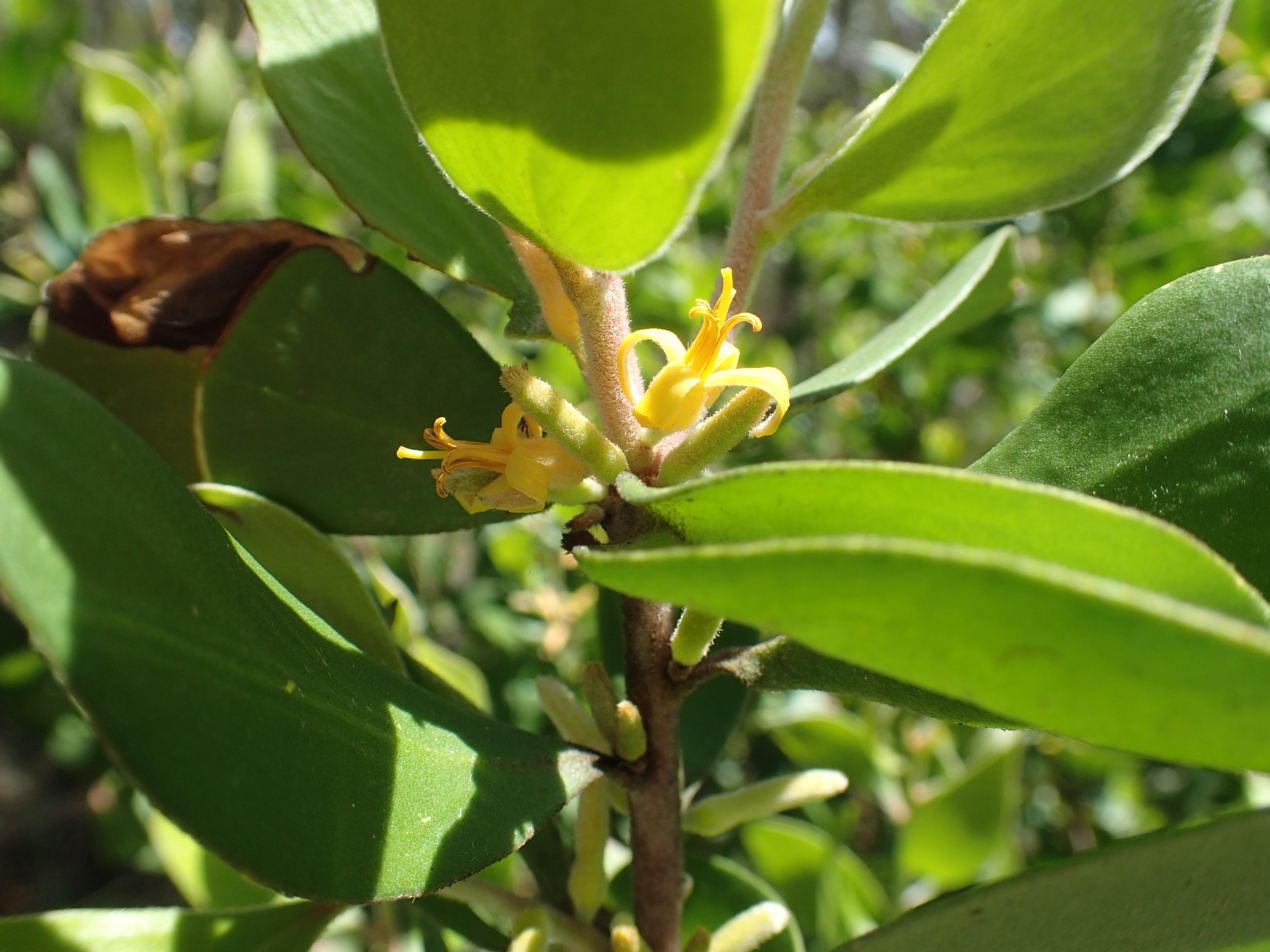
- Persoonia cornifolia flower

Scientific classification
- Kingdom: Plantae
- Clade: Tracheophytes
- Clade: Angiosperms
- Clade: Eudicots
- Order: Proteales
- Family: Proteaceae
- Genus: Persoonia
- Species: P. cornifolia

Binomial name
- Persoonia cornifolia A.Cunn. ex R.Br.
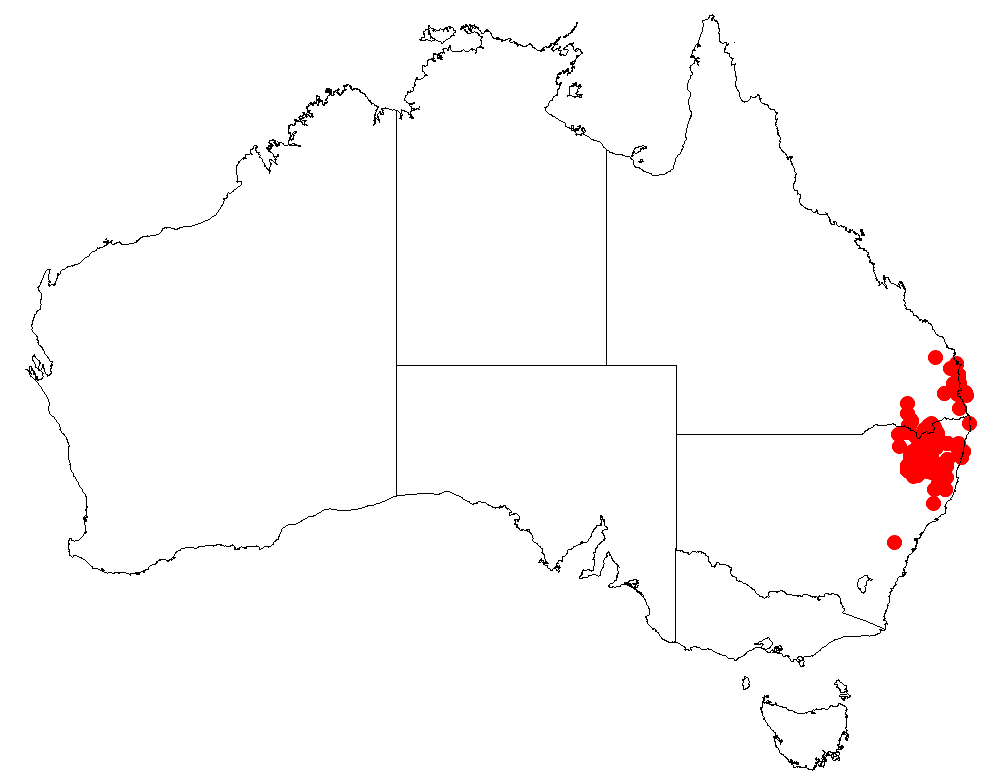
- Occurrence data downloaded from AVH

Synonyms
- Linkia cornifolia (A.Cunn. ex R.Br.) Kuntze; Persoonia cornifolia subsp. D; Persoonia tinifolia A.Cunn. ex Benth.

= Persoonia cornifolia =

Species of shrub

Persoonia cornifolia is a plant in the family Proteaceae and is endemic to eastern Australia. It is a shrub with elliptic to egg-shaped leaves and hairy yellow flowers, and grows in northern New South Wales and south-eastern Queensland.

== Description ==
Persoonia cornifolia is an erect or spreading shrub with hairy young growth. The leaves are elliptic to egg-shaped, 20–80 mm (0.79–3.15 in) long, 10–45 mm (0.39–1.77 in) wide and flat with the edges more or less turned downwards. The leaves are hairy when young but become glabrous with age. The flowers are arranged in small groups in leaf axils with a scale leaf at the base of each flower. Each flower is on the end of a densely hairy pedicel 1–2 mm (0.039–0.079 in) long. The flower is composed of four hairy tepals 10–13 mm (0.39–0.51 in) long, which are fused at the base but with the tips rolled back. The central style is surrounded by four yellow anthers that are also joined at the base with the tips rolled back, so that it resembles a cross when viewed end-on. The ovary is usually hairy. Flowering occurs from December to February and is followed by fruit which are green drupes.

== Taxonomy and naming ==
Persoonia cornifolia was first formally described in 1830 by Robert Brown from an unpublished manuscript by Allan Cunningham. Brown's description was published in Supplementum primum Prodromi florae Novae Hollandiae.

The specific epithet (cornifolia) is derived from the Latin words cornu meaning "horn" and folium meaning "leaf".

== Distribution and habitat ==
This persoonia grows in woodland and forest north from the Moonbi Range in north-eastern New South Wales and in south-eastern Queensland.

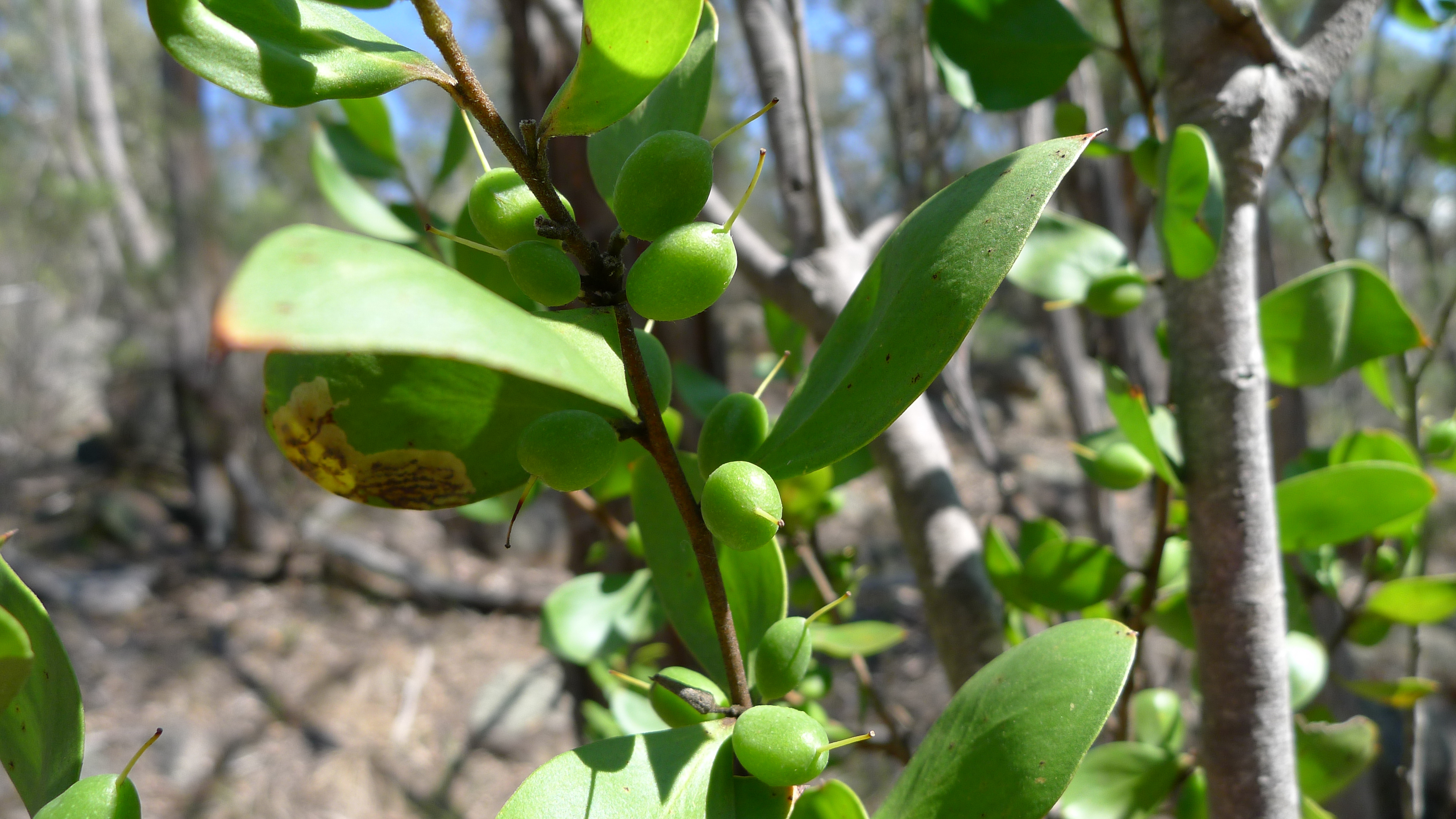
Fruit and foliage of Persoonia cornifolia

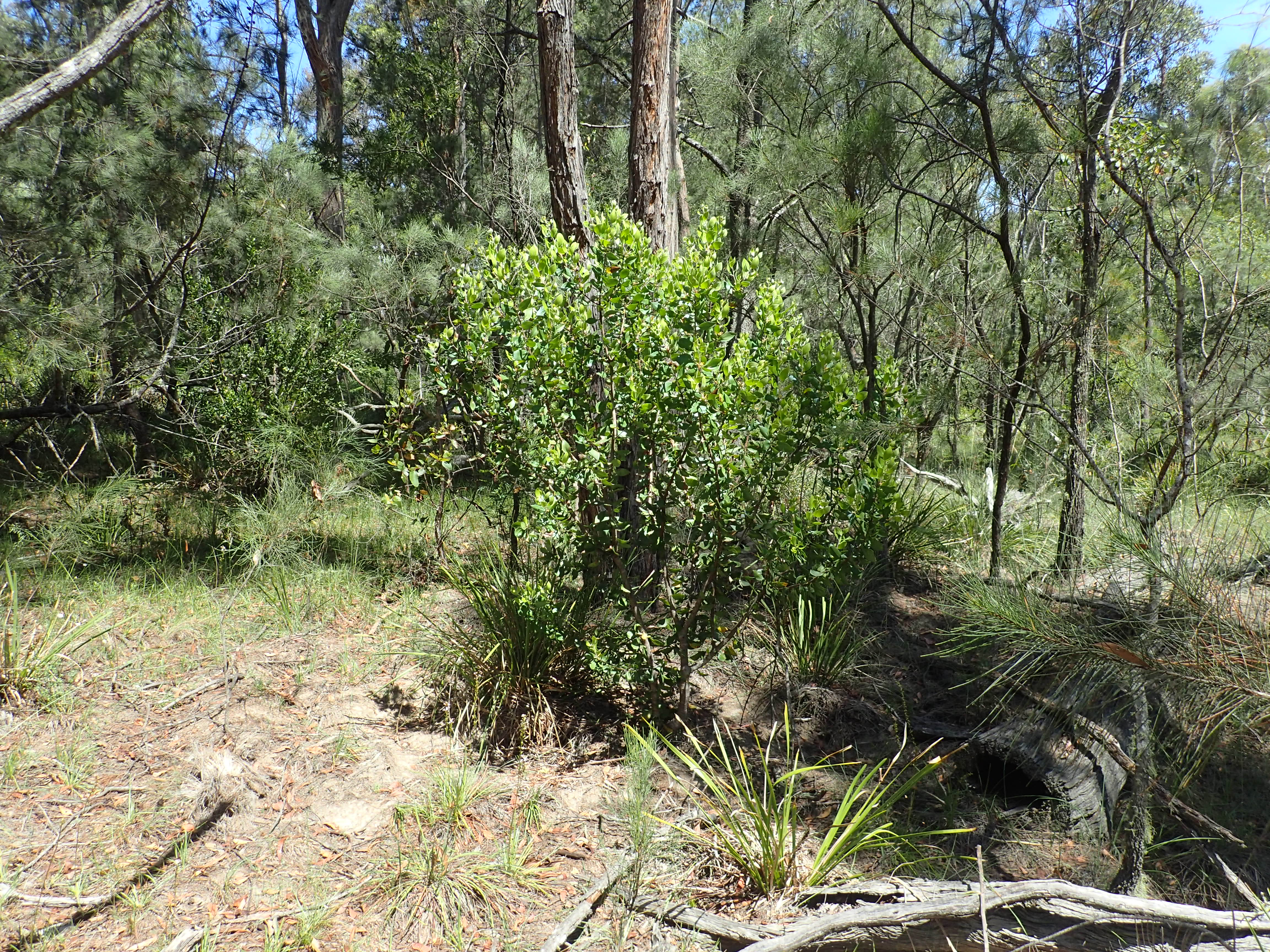
Persoonia cornifolia growing near Cathedral Rock National Park

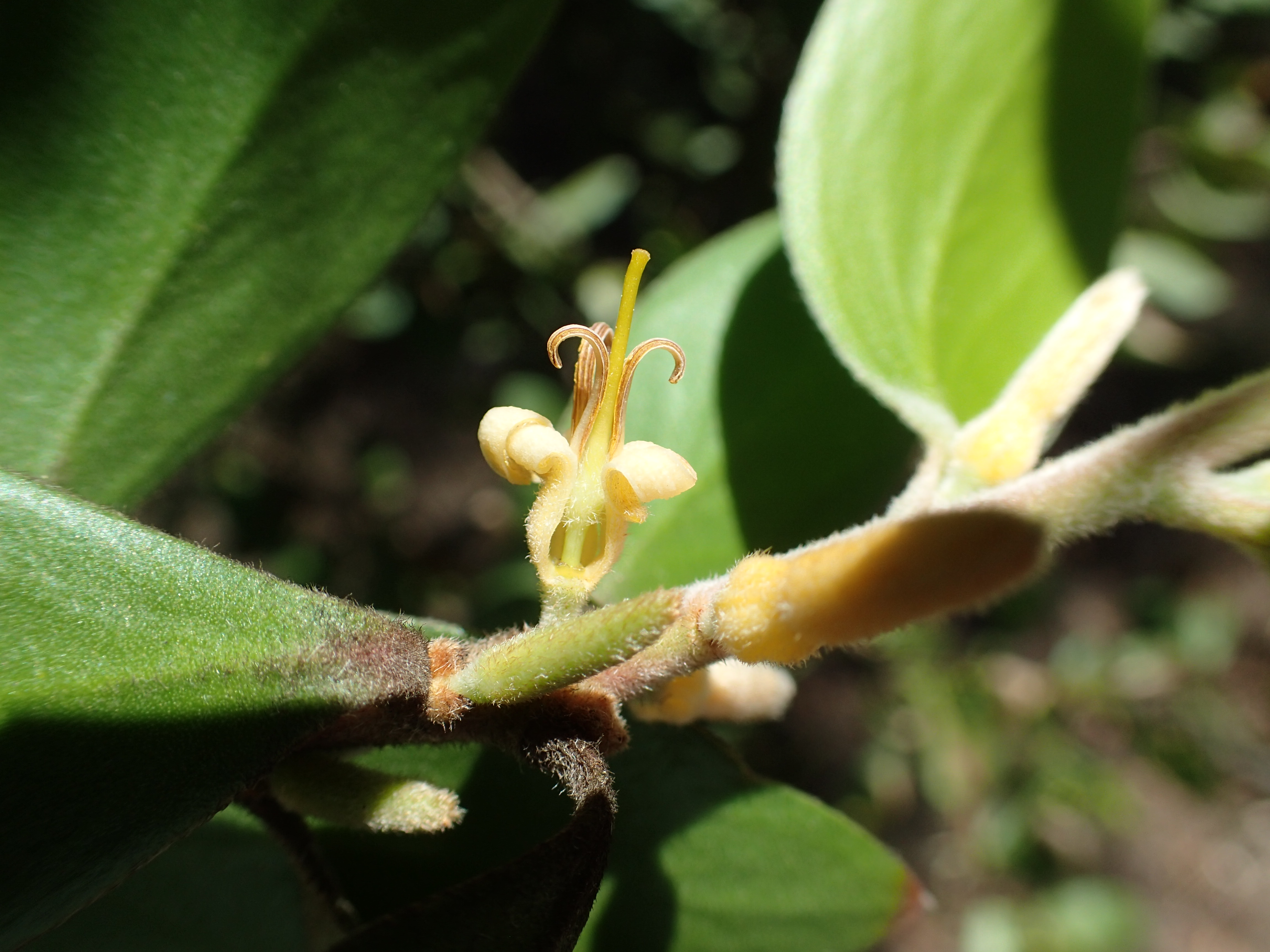
Hairy ovary of Persoonia cornifolia
