= Banksia 'Pygmy Possum' =

Cultivar of Banksia serrata

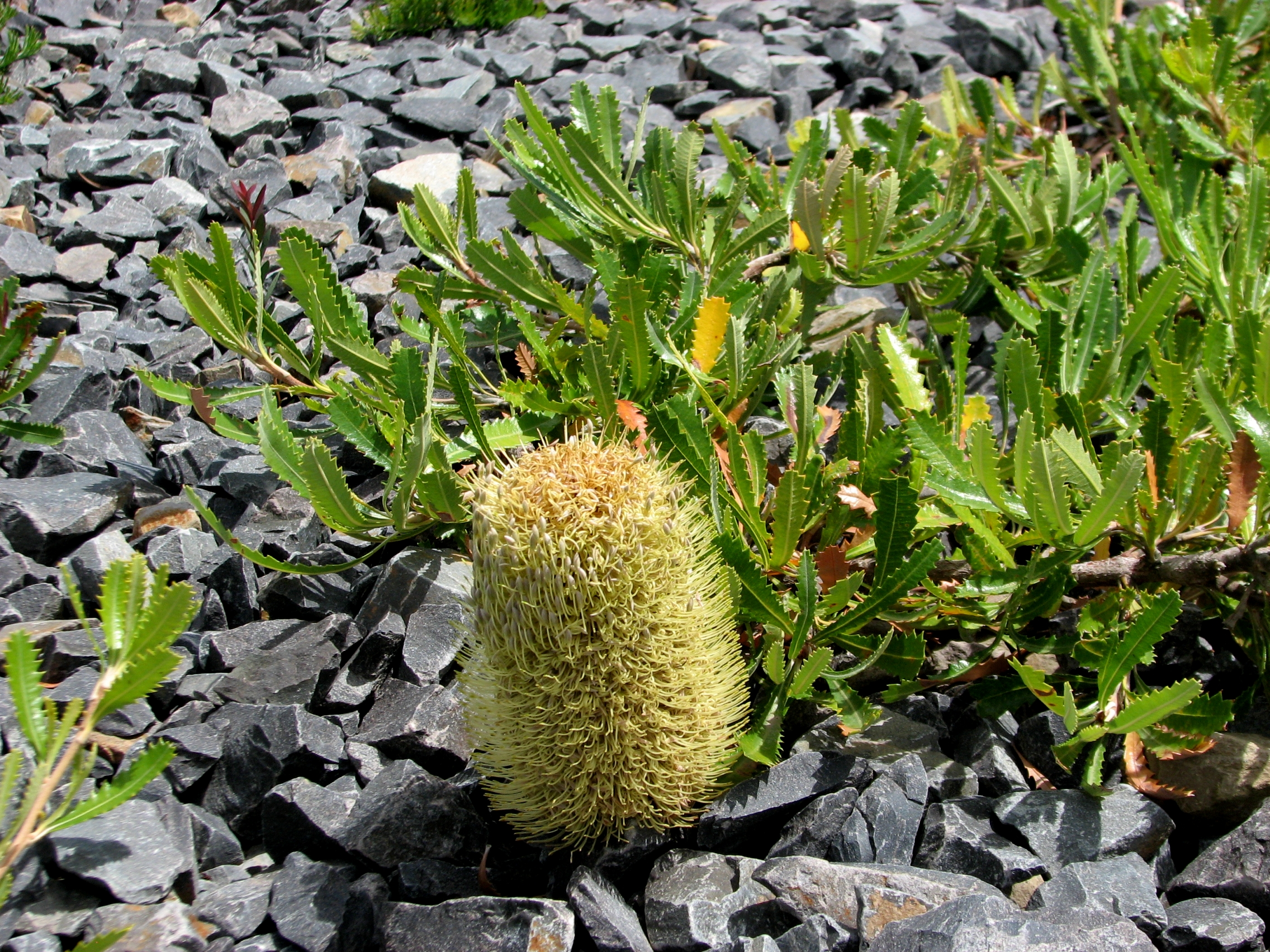
- Species: Banksia serrata
- Cultivar: 'Pygmy Possum'
- Origin: Green Cape, New South Wales

Banksia 'Pygmy Possum', formerly Banksia 'Austraflora Pygmy Possum', and also known by its extended cultivar name Banksia serrata 'Pygmy Possum', is a registered Banksia cultivar. It is a sprawling, very low growing coastal form of Banksia serrata (saw banksia), with very small leaves and small inflorescences.

It was selected from plants at Green Cape, New South Wales by Austraflora Nurseries in 1975, and registered as a cultivar in 1985. Propagation is by vegetative means.
