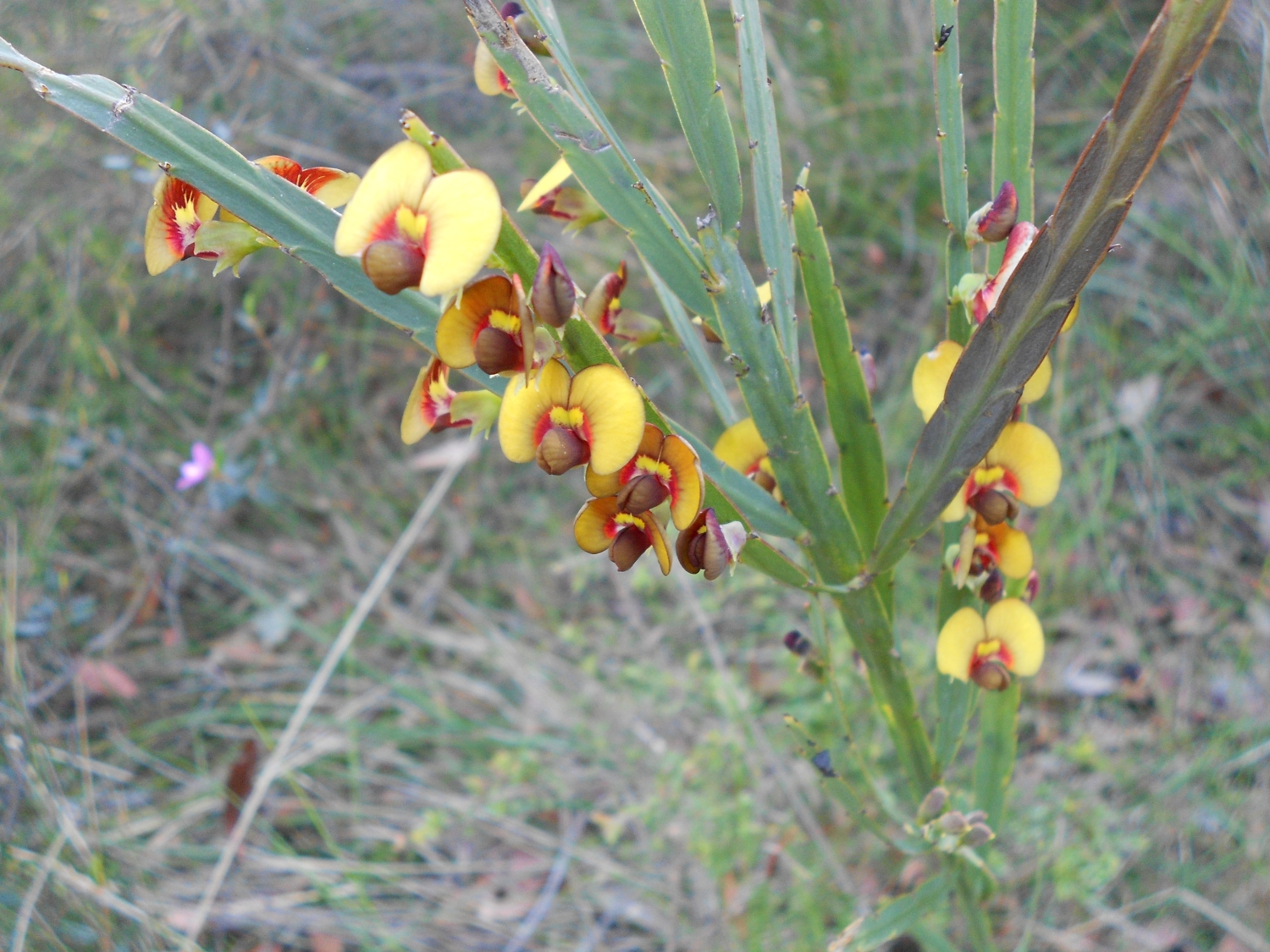
- Bossiaea ensata at Cowan

Scientific classification
- Kingdom: Plantae
- Clade: Tracheophytes
- Clade: Angiosperms
- Clade: Eudicots
- Clade: Rosids
- Order: Fabales
- Family: Fabaceae
- Subfamily: Faboideae
- Genus: Bossiaea
- Species: B. ensata

Binomial name
- Bossiaea ensata Sieber ex DC.
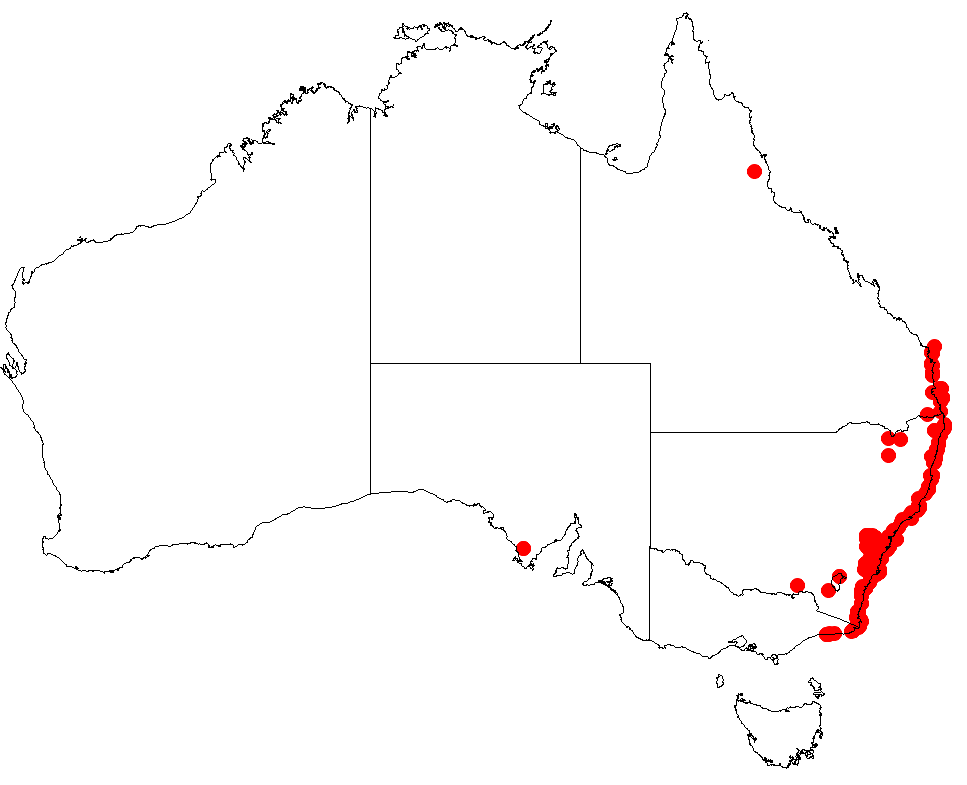
- Occurrence data from AVH

= Bossiaea ensata =

Sword bossiaea

Species of legume

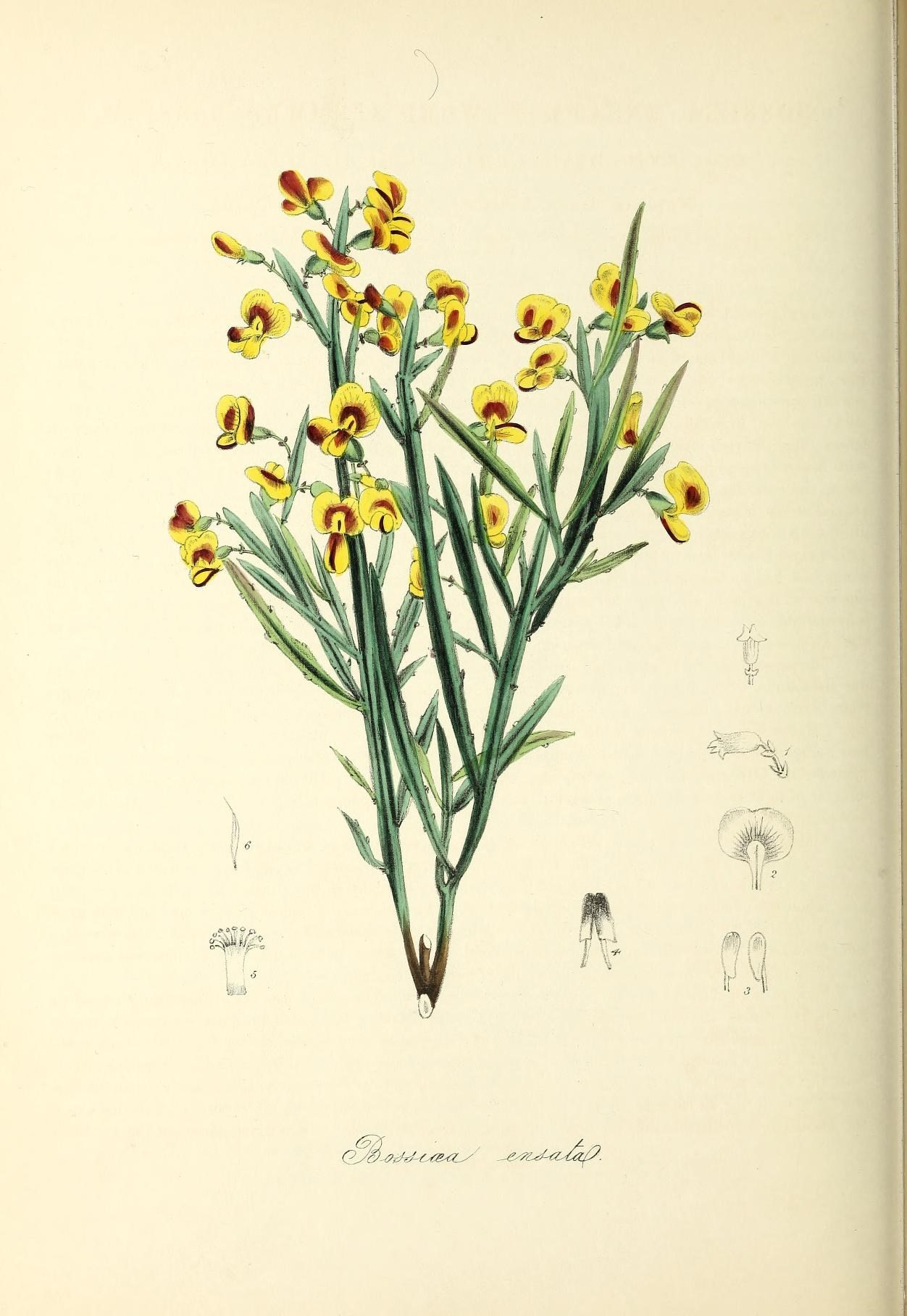
Illustration in Burnett's Plantæ utiliores

Bossiaea ensata, commonly known as sword bossiaea, is a species of flowering plant in the family Fabaceae and is endemic to south-eastern continental Australia. It is an erect or low-lying, glabrous shrub with flattened branches, flattened, winged cladodes, leaves mostly reduced to small scales, and orange-yellow and red flowers.

== Description ==
Bossiaea ensata is an erect to low-lying or sprawling, glabrous shrub that typically grows to a height of 1–2 m (3 ft 3 in – 6 ft 7 in) and has flattened branches and flattened, winged cladodes 2–10 mm (0.079–0.394 in) wide. The leaves, when present, are reduced to triangular scales 0.6–2 mm (0.024–0.079 in) long. The flowers are 6–10 mm (0.24–0.39 in) long and arranged singly in leaf axils 6–10 mm (0.24–0.39 in) long on pedicels up to 4 mm (0.16 in) long with two bracts up to 2 mm (0.079 in) long at the base and bracteoles near the middle of the pedicels. The sepals are 3–4 mm (0.12–0.16 in) long and joined at the base forming a bell-shaped tube, the two upper lobes longer than the lower three lobes. The standard petal is yellow with a red base and with red streaks or blotches on the back. The wings are yellow, sometimes with a red tinge and the keel pale greenish yellow. Flowering occurs from September to October and the fruit is an oblong pod 25–40 mm (0.98–1.57 in) long.

== Taxonomy ==
Bossiaea ensata was first formally described in 1825 by Augustin Pyramus de Candolle in Prodromus Systematis Naturalis Regni Vegetabilis from an unpublished description by Franz Sieber. The specific epithet (ensata) means "sword-shaped", referring to the flattened stems.

== Distribution and habitat ==
Sword bossiaea usually grows in sandy heath and is found on the coast and nearby tablelands of south-east Queensland, New South Wales and Victoria as far west as Marlo. There is also a record from the south of South Australia.
