= Cyrioides vittigera =

Scientific classification
- Domain: Eukaryota
- Kingdom: Animalia
- Phylum: Arthropoda
- Class: Insecta
- Order: Coleoptera
- Suborder: Polyphaga
- Infraorder: Elateriformia
- Family: Buprestidae
- Genus: Cyrioides
- Species: C. vittigera

Binomial name
- Cyrioides vittigera (Laporte & Gory) 1835

Species of beetle

Cyrioides vittigera, commonly known as the striped banksia jewel beetle, is a species of beetle in the family Buprestidae native to Western Australia. It was described by the French naturalists Francis de Laporte de Castelnau and Hippolyte Louis Gory in 1835.
