= Sydney High School Rifle Club =

Australian shooting sport organization

- Full name: Sydney High School Rifle Club
- Sport: Fullbore target rifle, ISSF Rifle
- Founded: 1883
- League: Athletic Association of the Great Public Schools
- Based in: Sydney
- Home ground: ANZAC Rifle Range
- Colours: Chocolate and Blue
- Website: www.shsrc.org.au

Sydney High School Rifle Club is a Rifle Shooting club established in 1883 within Sydney Boys High School. It is based at the ANZAC Rifle Range in Sydney, Australia. The club is affiliated to the New South Wales Rifle Association and participates in competitions conducted by the AAGPS.

== History ==
Rifle Shooting at the school started with cadet shooting as early as October 1883. In 1910, forty cadets formed the Sydney High School Rifle Club. Foundation officials were Rhodes (Captain), Berman (Secretary) and a Committee of Biden, Beasley and Uren. Competitions were successful. H. G. Kershaw, by winning the 200-yard match (with 15 consecutive bullseyes) showed the NRA of NSW the talent which was confirmed by his success in later life. H. G. Kershaw is believed to have been the first Sydney High student to visit Bisley Ranges in England, having travelled there with the Coronation Contingent in 1911.

After the War, the Rifle Club was reformed in 1924. Owing to the distance between School and Liverpool, permission was granted to shoot at Long Bay and to compete in events conducted by the New South Wales Militia Rifle Clubs Union.

In 1931 the Anderson Cup was won, plus the Buchanan GPS Shield (first GPS rifle match won by Sydney Boys High School) The team placed 3rd in the GPS Premiership. Competing against Militia Officers 10 to 20 years his senior, club secretary Jim Sweet won the Champion of Champions event and was praised at a School Assembly by Headmaster G. C. Saxby. The Sunday Sun reported on 26 April 1931, SHS boy Cadet Sweet led from first match to top score at each of 4 ranges to win Champion of Champions Militia Shoot. Club Captain C. Ebsworth won the Anzac Match in the Two-Day June Shoot.

In 1933, the Club Championship was won by Club Captain, Arthur Roden Cutler, who later became Governor of New South Wales. In 1934, the club secretary J. E. Ryan won the Club Championship, with Cutler winning the GPS Cup.

Early in World War II many British .303 rifles were lost at Dunkirk. The Australian Rifle Clubs and Cadet Corps returned their .303 rifles for use by British Troops. The Cadets were then issued with smaller single shot .310 rifles and the Clubs continued with .22 ammunition with small-bore rifles.

In 1942 former Club Captain A. R. Cutler was awarded the Victoria Cross for conspicuous gallantry during the Syrian campaign and for bravery during bitter fighting at Merdjayoun. Prowess with anti-tank rifles and Bren Guns repeatedly saved his life and the lives of others during those battles.

In 1943 a .22 small-bore rifle range was built at Sydney Boys High School for weekly practice and for competition with other schools.

After World War II, GPS Rifle Shooting competition were resumed without delay. By the mid 1950s the School 25-yard Range was in frequent use. Twelve from the Cadet Unit qualified for Crossed Rifles Badges.

In 1979, target shooting was reintroduced at the school. A range was completed on campus in late 1987 with the first shot fired the first shot in February 1988. The Range was resumed for classrooms in 1994. Practices are now held at the ANZAC Rifle Range at Malabar. The club has, since the early 1990s, also welcomed students from Sydney Girls High School.

In 2009, the club was Co-Premiers in the GPS competition, along with the Kings School.

In 2012, the club was Co-Premiers in the GPS competition, along with The Armidale School.

In 2013, the club won the 2nd grade competition for the first time in its history.

In 2016, the club was Premiers in the GPS 1st Grade and 2nd Grade Competitions.

In 2019, the club was Premiers in the GPS 1st Grade and 2nd Grade Competitions.

== Overseas Tours ==
Since 1994, the club has sent teams overseas to contest international events. The 1994 Tour to the United Kingdom, which involved seven boys and one girl, was an outstanding success, and an invitation was received from the British National Rifle Association to send a further team to England in 1996. This team, of five students, contested the Imperial Meeting at Bisley and shot in the Under 25 Match against national teams from the United Kingdom and Canada.

In 1998, a team travelled to Canada to contest the Dominion of Canada Rifle Association matches at Connaught Ranges, just outside Ottawa. The same year, Sydney Boys High School won its first GPS Rifle Shooting Premiership.

In 2000, along with school teams from The Armidale School and New England Girls' School, a team was sent to the World Championships and 'Millennium Meeting' at Bisley as part of the Australian Schools Combined Rifle Team. A number of Sydney Boys High School students were selected to compete in the Australian Under 21 Team during these Championships, with one student touring with the Australian Under 25 Team throughout Scotland and England.
