= ANZAC Rifle Range =

Rifle range in Malabar, New South Wales, Australia

- Boora
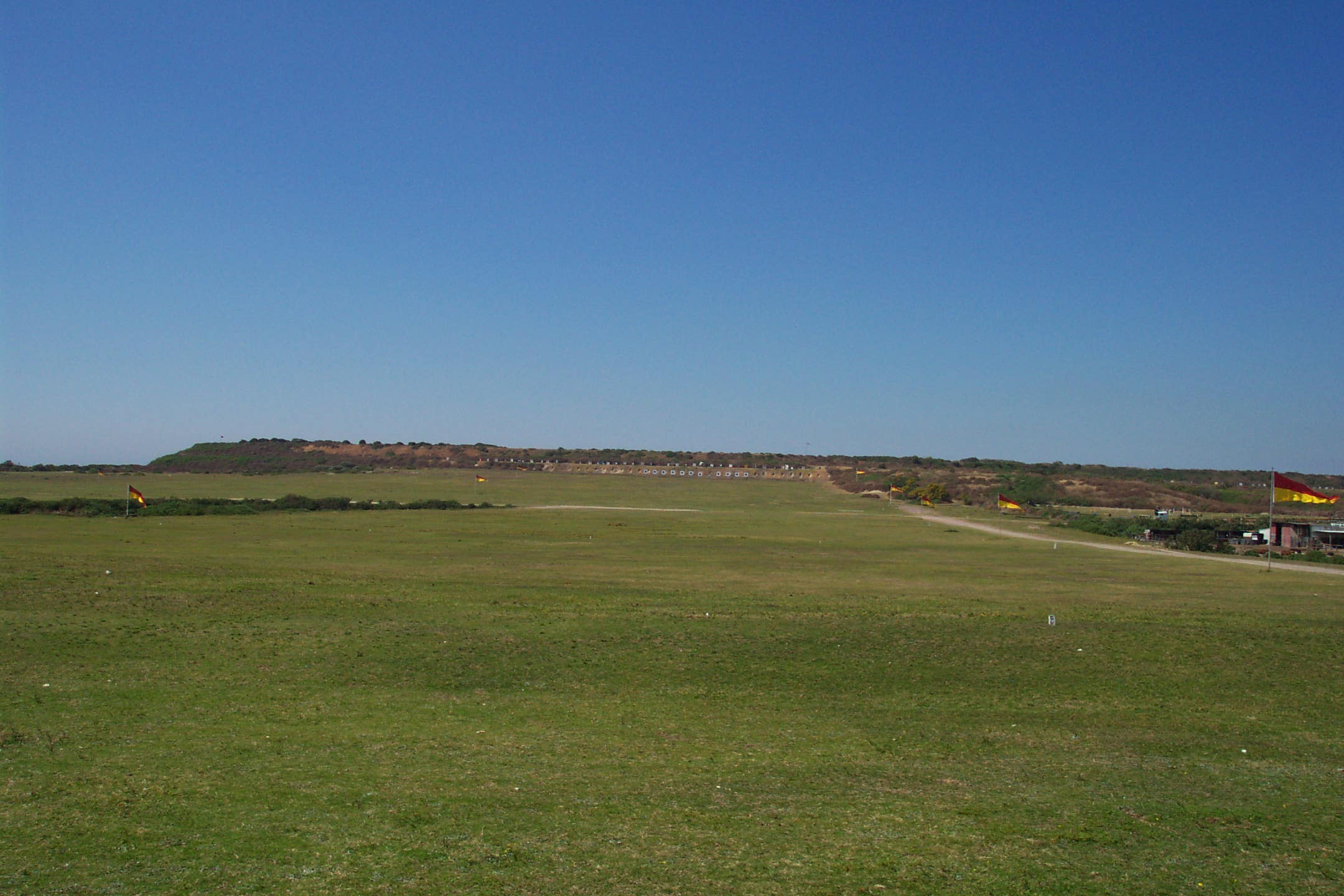
- ANZAC Rifle Range in September 2006

- Location in greater metropolitan Sydney
- Former names: Long Bay Rifle Range
- Location: Franklin Street, Malabar Headland, Malabar, City of Randwick, New South Wales, Australia
- Coordinates: 33°57′40″S 151°15′28″E
- Owner: Commonwealth of Australia
- Operator: New South Wales Rifle Association
- Type: Rifle range

Construction
- Opened: 1855

The ANZAC Rifle Range is a rifle range located on the Malabar Headland, Malabar, in the City of Randwick local government area of New South Wales, Australia. It is headquarters to the New South Wales Rifle Association, and hosts the annual NSW Queen's Prize shooting competitions. The range is located on land owned by the Commonwealth of Australia.

== Chronology of the ANZAC Rifle Range ==
- 1855 – Recreational shooting begins on the Malabar headland.
- 1855 – The new village of Long Bay is notified in the Government Gazette.
- 1859 – The Randwick Municipal Council area is created which includes the Malabar suburb and headland.
- 1860 – A meeting is held on 5 October 1860 which results in an agreement to form the National Rifle Association of New South Wales (later renamed to the current New South Wales Rifle Association). The first president is appointed on 15 October 1860. Annual Prize Meetings are held on a rifle range at the Randwick Race Course from 1861 to 1866 and thereafter the Paddington Rifle Range.
- 1866 – Land is offered for sale and lease on Malabar headland. Maps show planned subdivisions and roadways to service the new farming allotments.
- 1870s–1880s – Long Bay Road (now known as ANZAC Road) is gazetted as a military road by the Government, grants were provided to construct and maintain it. Large amounts were spent on the road and it was possible to travel from Sydney to Botany. When the special subsidy was discontinued the road fell into disrepair and was covered by creeping sand dunes in the Matraville and Maroubra areas.
- 1876 – Australia compete in the first "Palma Match" (originally called "The Great Centennial International Long Range Match") held at Creedmore USA.
- 1879 – The first official Inter-Colonial "Queen’s Prize" meeting held by the NSW Rifle Association. Each state continues to host an annual Queen's Prize rifle shooting competition to this day.
- 1882 – St Albans ship wreck at Malabar.
- 1883 – Sydney High School Rifle Club formed.
- 1886 – An order is issued to close the Paddington Rifle Range due to the danger to workmen constructing present day Centennial Park but shooting is allowed to continue on Saturday afternoons until May 1890.
- 1888 – The National Rifle Association of Australia (NRAA) is formed.
- 1888 – Twelve targets are reported to be in operation on the Malabar headland.
- 1888 The Australian Centennial Prize Meeting – is held at the Paddington Rifle Range with competitors from the British Empire.
- 1890 – The caretakers cottage was built around 1890 on the Malabar headland.
- 1891 – The Randwick Rifle Range is established near Maroubra Junction.
- 1898 – Hereward ship wreck at Malabar.
- 1899 – Tokapo ship wreck at Malabar.
- 1900 – A tramline towards La Perouse began operation in September 1900. A month later the line was extended across paddocks to the rifle range.
- 1902 – The NSW Government reserves the eastern half of the Malabar headland for public recreation.
- 1903 – Seven trustees from Brand are appointed to manage the rifle range on the Malabar headland.
- 1905 – The NSW Government reserves the remainder of the Malabar headland from sale or lease.
- 1907 – The first official "Empire Match" is held, this is the premier international rifle shooting competition contested by Australia, New Zealand, Great Britain, Canada, India, South Africa, West Indies, Rhodesia, Jamaica, Channel islands, Kenya, Guernsey and Bermuda.
- 1910 – Sydney High School Cadet Corps use the Malabar range for training.
- 1910 – The NSW Government dedicates the Malabar headland for Military Purposes, officially acknowledging the existence of the rifle range.
- 1914–1918 World War I – The Randwick and Malabar rifle ranges are used to train Australian Infantry Forces for the First World War.
- 1914 – The National Rifle Association of NSW provide 15 instructors to the military for duty at the Malabar rifle range.
- 1916 – A sewerage outlet is established on the south side of the headland.
- 1916 – The National Rifle Association records show that as of 31 December 6486 members of the NSW rifle clubs have enlisted for active service.
- 1917 – The National Rifle Association send an additional 150 men to "the front" as reinforcements.
- 1917 – A new rifle range is constructed at Liverpool (unofficially known as the ANZAC Rifle Range until 1922) with 110 targets.
- 1919 – The rifle range on the Malabar headland is named the Long Bay Rifle Range.
- 1920s – Model aircraft are first recorded to be flown on the Malabar headland.
- 1920 – Scots College rifle range reinstated after being pulled down in 1918 and .303 rifles received from Area Officer
- 1922 – A formal "Dedication Ceremony" is held at the Liverpool rifle range naming it the "ANZAC Rifle Range" in memory of the 599 Fallen Riflemen of the 1914–1918 World War who were members of NSW rifle clubs.
- 1922 – Scots College Rifle Club formed as part of Cadets. ‘It is our intention soon, to pick a school team, with the idea of competing with some of the other schools’ The Scotsman June 1922
- 1923 – The Long Bay Rifle Range is used by the NSW Citizens Forces Rifle Association (now known as Military Rifle Clubs Association), the Sydney High School Rifle Club and the National Rifle Association of NSW.
- 1923 – Scots College rifle range unavailable due to extension of playing fields, but a new site will be selected so Rifle Club can continue
- 1923 – The closure of the Randwick Rifle Range and transfer of the rifle clubs to the ANZAC Rifle Range Liverpool.
- 1925 – The Army give notice that the rifle clubs using Long Bay Rifle Range are to be transferred to the ANZAC Rifle Range Liverpool.
- 1925 – More rifles are issued to Scot College Rifle Club by the department and due to the efforts of Captain E.A. Walker. Scots enters the GPS Shooting competition
- 1926 – Scots College use Long Bay Rifle Range used for practice. ‘B’ Grade Rifle team are GPS Premiers. R. Murchison becomes the first student to receive colours for Rifle Shooting. First time the Scots College Rifle Club is mentioned in the front of ‘The Scotsman’ with the other sports
- 1929 – The control of the Malabar headland and Long Bay Rifle Range is transferred to the Commonwealth Government.
- 1929 – Scots College start the Inter-House and Old Boys shooting competitions
- 1930s – Local residents use the Malabar headland as a venue for two-up and other gambling activities.
- 1931 – The Malabar is shipwrecked near Boora Point on 2 April 1931.
- 1931 – Sydney Boys High School win the Anderson Cup and the Buchanan GPS Shield. The team is placed 3rd in the GPS Premiership. Competing against Militia Officers 10 to 20 years his senior, club secretary Jim Sweet won the Champion of Champions event. Club Captain C. Ebsworth won the ANZAC Match.
- 1933 – The village of Brand is renamed Malabar on 29 September to distinguish the local village from Long Bay Gaol.
- 1933 – Sydney Boys High School Club Captain Arthur Roden Cutler (who later became Governor of New South Wales) wins the Club Championship.
- 1934 – Sydney Boys High School Club Secretary J. E. Ryan won the Club Championship and Club Captain Roden Cutler won the GPS Cup.
- 1938 Australia's 150th Anniversary Celebrations – The "Empire Match" is held at the Liverpool Range from 5 to 12 February 1938, attended by 1,300 competitors including teams from Great Britain, New Zealand and South Africa. 337,150 rounds fired.
- 1938 – Scots College Senior Shooting team equal 1st NRA Shield, 1st Rawson Cup and 2nd Buchanan Shield and the Great Public Schools (GPS)Premiers for the first time (equal with Shore)
- 1939, 27 November – The Hotchkiss guns were used for the first time at Long Bay rifle range and the result of the shoot was very satisfactory.
- 1939–1945 World War II – Military installations (circa 43 in number) are built on the Malabar headland, notably the Boora Point Battery in 1941. The Long Bay Rifle Range is used for training of the Armed Forces.
- 1939 – Scots College win Rawson Cup, NRA Shield Great Public Schools (GPS) Premiers with Shore for the second time 1940. Rifle shooting had to be abandoned owing to lack of ammunition, Mr. Travers replaces Major Walker as MIC of shooting when the GPS competition is abandoned, Scots changed from club shooting to military shooting
- 1941 – Trials of the 9mm Owen gun are conducted September to October 1941 at the Long Bay Rifle Range, Malabar. The Owen Gun is found to be more reliable than the American Thompson and the British Sten guns. The Owen Gun is issued to Australian Armed Forces towards the end of 1942 and continued in service during the Korean and Vietnam Wars.
- 1942–1946 – Many thousands from the Australian rifle clubs enlist in the Australian Military Services. The figure is believed to be between 33000 and 38000.
- 1942 – The British lose 303 rifles at Dunkirk. The Australian Rifle Clubs and Cadet Corps supply their 303 rifles for use by the British Troops.
- 1942 – Sydney Boys High School former Club Captain A. R. Cutler is awarded the Victoria Cross for conspicuous gallantry during the Syrian campaign and for bravery during bitter fighting at Merdjayoun.
- 1946 – Great Public Schools (GPS)Rifle Shooting contest held at Long Bay Rifle range for the first time since 1939
- 1947 – Scots College win Rawson Cup and are placed third overall in Great Public Schools (GPS) competition
- 1951 – The Cumberland County Plan zones the Malabar headland as 'special uses'.
- 1954 – The Memorial Gates at the entrance to ANZAC Rifle Range Liverpool are constructed and dedicated on 10 October as a "Memorial to Fallen Riflemen" of the two World Wars and the Korea Campaign.
- 1960 – The Boora Point Battery is decommissioned.
- 1960 – 142.5 hectares of the Randwick Rifle Range are sold to Randwick Council.
- 1962 – The Army give notice that the ANZAC Rifle Range at Liverpool would close December 1967. Planning commenced to transfer the rifle clubs to Long Bay Rifle Range at Malabar.
- 1964 – Scots College win Buchanan Shield and third overall in the Great Public Schools (GPS) competition
- 1967 – Closure of the ANZAC Rifle Range, Liverpool after 47 years. The rifle clubs transfer to the Long Bay Rifle Range.
- 1968 – Scots College are unable to field two teams of 8, so Scots do not enter the Great Public Schools (GPS) competition this year. Awarded Anderson Cup in Military Rifle Clubs Union Competition as top Schoolboy team
- 1968–1988 – The Malabar headland and rifle range site is used for extensive landfill operations.
- 1968 – Shooting championships at the Long Bay Rifle Range attract 353 entries.
- 1969 – Scots College team 2nd overall in the Military Rifle Clubs Union competition winning the Anderson Cup, Lone Pine and Col. McVickers Cup. After a 10-year break the Inter-House Shooting contest was again held
- 1970 – The Long Bay Rifle Range Malabar is renamed, quote "It has been decided, that the name "ANZAC" should be perpetuated and that its close association with rifle club shooting should be preserved, and it is proposed that, with effect from 25 April 1970, the Long Bay Rifle Range at Malabar be renamed ANZAC Rifle Range. M.F.Brogan, C.B., C.B.E. Major-General, General Officer Commanding, Eastern Command."
- 1971 – Scots College win Rawson Cup and win Seconds Team Shield
- 1972 – A lease agreement between the Australian Army and the NSW Rifle Association describe the terms of use and termination conditions for the ANZAC Rifle Range at Malabar.
- 1973 – Scots College win NRA Shield for the first time since 1939
- 1975 – The Sporting Shooters Association of Australia (SSAA) first use the ANZAC Rifle Range Malabar after reaching an agreement with the Army.
- 1978 – The Memorial Gates commemorating those who served during the World Wars and the Korea Campaign are moved from Liverpool to the Malabar range.
- 1979 – Scots College win Rawson Cup
- 1980 – Scots College win Buchanan Shield and the Great Public Schools (GPS) Premiership
- 1981 – Scots College win Rawson Cup, Buchanan Shield and Great Public Schools (GPS) Premiership
- 1982 – Scots College win NRA Shield and come 2nd overall in the Great Public Schools (GPS) competition
- 1982 – The Sydney Model Aero Club share use of the Malabar headland.
- 1983 – Scots College win Rawson Cup, NRA Shield, Buchanan Shield and both 1st and 2nds in the Great Public Schools (GPS) Premiership for the first time
- 1984 – Scots College win Rawson Cup
- 1986 – The Commonwealth Government announced its intention to sell the Malabar headland after the Bicentenary Shooting Championships. Official military use ceases.
- 1986 – The Energy Authority of New South Wales erects an experimental wind driven generator on the Malabar headland.
- 1987 – Eighty hectares of the Malabar headland is placed in the register of the National Estate. The area is said to contain rare mallee scrub (Eucalyptus Obstans, formerly Obtusiflora).
- 1988 Australia's Bicentenary (1788–1988) – More than 900 competitors from the Commonwealth of Nations and the USA Palma Match team take part in the Bicentennial Shooting Championships held at ANZAC Rifle Range Malabar.
- 1988 – Scots College win Buchanan Shield and are runners up in the Great Public Schools (GPS) competition
- 1988 – Military training ceases on the Malabar headland on 8 May after 78 years. On this date the flag was lowered to the Last Post alongside the setting sun.
- 1988 – The Government receive a number of tenders for the Malabar headland including a proposal from Club Med to build a three hundred room resort complex linked to an eighteen-hole golf course.
- 1989 – Scots College win Rawson Cup
- 1990 – A legal judgement declares that the Commonwealth had not validly terminated the NSW Rifle Association lease agreement. Another Notice of Termination was subsequently served and a new eviction date set for 25 August 1993.
- 1992 – Commonwealth Games trials are held at the ANZAC Rifle Range Malabar.
- 1992 – Sydney Water Board considers purchasing the range site to increase the size of the Malabar Sewage Treatment Plant.
- 1993 – The Malabar Riding School is formed on the rifle range.
- 1994 – The 150th Anniversary of the Sydney Rifle Club. A judgement handed down on 22 July by NSW Supreme Court confirmed the Commonwealth's right to close Anzac Rifle Range.
- 1998 – The Commonwealth Government issued a joint media release on 21 September by the Minister for Finance and Administration and the Minister for Sport and Tourism. "the sporting shooters of NSW will be able to establish new headquarters at Holsworthy, under a grant of $9 million from the Commonwealth Government."
- 2000 – The Friends of Malabar Headland (FoMH) conservation organisation is formed "to protect the natural and cultural heritage of Malabar headland".
- 2005 – The Defence Department disallow re-location of the ANZAC Rifle Range to Holsworthy due to the military installations and civilian occupancy restrictions.
- 2007 – The Australian Government agree to a long term lease for the NSW Rifle Association to remain at Anzac Rifle Range Malabar. Later the same year this decision was overturned by the Labor government following a general election.
- 2007 – The Australian Government announced that it would transfer responsibility for the whole of the 177-hectare (440-acre) Malabar Headland to the NSW Government.
- 2008 – Sydney Boys High School Rifle Club 125th Anniversary.
- 2009 – Sydney Boys High School are Co-Premiers in the GPS competition, along with the Kings School
- 2010 – The 150th Anniversary of the NSW Rifle Association 1860 to 2010.
- 2010 – The Australian Government announced its intention to transfer sections of the headland (70 hectares (170 acres) excluding the central rifle range section) to the State of NSW for use as a national park after remediation work to make it safe for public use.
- 2011 – The Deed of Transfer for Lot 102 (the western section) from the Commonwealth Government to the State of NSW is signed 27 February 2011.
- 2011 – A Process Agreement is signed for Lot 202 (the eastern section) to describe the process and future transfer of this section from the Commonwealth Government to the State of NSW is signed 27 February 2011.
- 2011 – The Commonwealth Government issues termination notices in April 2011 to the Drummoyne RSL Pistol Club, the Malabar Riding School, the Sporting Shooters of Australia and the Sydney Model Aero Club instructing them to vacate the headland by 31 October 2011. The lease agreements for the remaining users, the NSW Rifle Association and the NSW Smallbore and Air Rifle Association contain a relocation clause allowing continued use of the headland until a suitable alternative range site is provided by the Government.
- 2011 – The Commonwealth Government issues termination notices on 21 October to the NSW Rifle Association and the NSW Smallbore and Air Rifle Association instructing them to vacate the headland by 31 January 2012. The NSW Rifle Association start legal proceedings to challenge the validity of the termination notice. The leases for the other users of the headland are terminated in November 2011.
- 2012 – Sydney Boys High School are Co-Premiers in the GPS competition, along with The Armidale School
- 2012 – The western section of the headland is transferred from the Commonwealth to the NSW Government on 2 March 2012. This 17.7-hectare (44-acre) area included the Smallbore Rifle Range and NSW Rifle Association buildings that were demolished in October 2012. The area contains remnants of the Eastern Suburbs Banksia Scrub, eucalypt woodlands and coastal heath land that now form part of a National Park.
- 2012 – The Malabar Headland Protection Bill 2012 is introduced 2 May "to protect the environmental values and Aboriginal cultural heritage of the Malabar headland".
- 2012 – The NSW Supreme Court judgement 20 July directs the Commonwealth Government to arrange an alternative range location before terminating the NSW Rifle Association lease. The eastern section of the headland (Lot 202) forms part of the rifle range safety area and its proposed transfer cannot proceed until the ANZAC Rifle Range is relocated.
- 2012 – The Commonwealth Government demolish over $5 million worth of community infrastructure including the Malabar Riding School structures, Army Barrack Huts, Caretakers Cottage, Smallbore Rifle Range and the Sporting Shooters Association of Australia Bench Rest Rifle Range in October 2012.
- 2013 – The Liberal–National Party Coalition promised within six months of winning the 2015 state election that the horse riders will be returned to the Range. The NSWRA is to remain until their reallocation to another suitable site or failing that, is to remain permanently.

== Past and present users of the ANZAC Rifle Range ==
The following organisations are current or past users of the ANZAC Rifle Range located on the headland site:

1. Australian Protective Services
2. Aviation Industry Rifle Club Inc., former QANTAS Staff Shooting Club
3. Bankstown Chatswood Rifle Club, includes Bankstown RC 1915 and Chatswood RC 1915
4. Bexley Smallbore Rifle Club
5. Bradmill Rifle Club
6. Cabra-Vale Diggers Rifle Club
7. Concord Rifle Club
8. Cronulla Rifle Club
9. Daily Telegraph Rifle Club
10. Drummoyne RSL Pistol Club
11. Earlwood Bardwell Park Rifle Club
12. Endeavour Rifle Club, includes the Sydney Naval Rifle Establishment 1946 and Sutherland RC 1914
13. Friends of Malabar Headland (FoMH), formed 2000
14. Holsworthy Rifle Club, includes the former Sydney Volunteer Defence Corps (VDC) RC 1946, the Randwick RC 1901 and Wunderlich RC 1910
15. Hurstville Rifle Club
16. Malabar Riding School, formed 1993 South East Equestrian Club, lease terminated November 2011
17. Malabar Rifle Club
18. Malabar RSL Rifle Club
19. Maroubra RSL Rifle Club
20. Marrickville Rifle Club
21. Metropolitan District Rifle Association, formed c1898
22. Military Rifle Clubs Association Inc., formed 1923
23. Mosman Neutral Bay Rifle Club, formed 1915
24. NSW Police Rifle Club
25. NSW Rifle Association, formed 1860
26. NSW Smallbore and Air Rifle Association, lease terminated November 2011
27. NSW Sydney Air Rifle Association, lease terminated November 2011
28. Penshurst Rifle Club
29. Port Jackson Rifle Club, includes the former University of NSW RC and Cronulla RC
30. Prospect Rifle Club
31. Railway and Tramways Institute Rifle Club, includes the former Workshops RC, Loco RC and Traffic RC. This club is a lot older than 1910
32. Rockdale Rifle Club
33. Rose Bay Rifle Club
34. Royal Australian Engineers (C.M.F.) Rifle Club Inc.
35. Royal Australian Navy Rifle Reserve Club (RANRRC),
36. Scots College Rifle Club, formed 1922
37. Sporting Shooters Association of Australia, formed 1948, lease terminated November 2011
38. State Penitentiary Rifle Club
39. State Protection Group Rifle Club
40. Sydney City Smallbore Club, lease terminated November 2011
41. Sydney County Council Rifle Club
42. Sydney Grammar School,
43. Sydney High School Rifle Club, formed 1883, lease terminated November 2011
44. Sydney Model Aero Club, formed 1982, lease terminated November 2011
45. Sydney Naval Establishments Rifle Club
46. Sydney Pistol Club
47. Sydney Rifle Club, formed 1844
48. Sydney Services Rifle Club
49. Sydney University Rifle Club
50. United Services Institute Rifle Club Inc.
51. Woollahra Rifle Club, lease terminated November 2011
52. Yorkshire Society Rifle Club

=== Sydney Model Aero Club ===
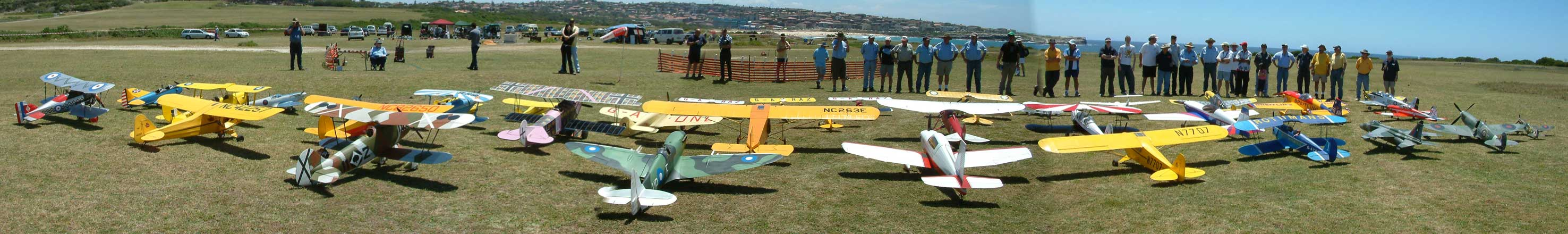
Competing models in the first round of the State All Scale competition 2003

Miniature aircraft have been flown on the Malabar headland since the 1920s. The Sydney Model Aero Club operated on the ANZAC Rifle Range from 1982 until their lease was terminated by the federal government in November 2011.

=== Former Malabar Riding School ===
The Malabar Riding School operated on the Malabar headland from 1993 until their lease was terminated by the federal government in November 2011. The riding school assisted local community groups, including seniors, at risk teens, local indigenous groups, people with disabilities, apprentice jockeys, Pony Club, TAFE and university students. They also participated in parades for the local RSL Clubs and other groups such as the Australian Light Horse Association and the Reserve Forces Day Parades attended by the NSW Governor and the governor-general.

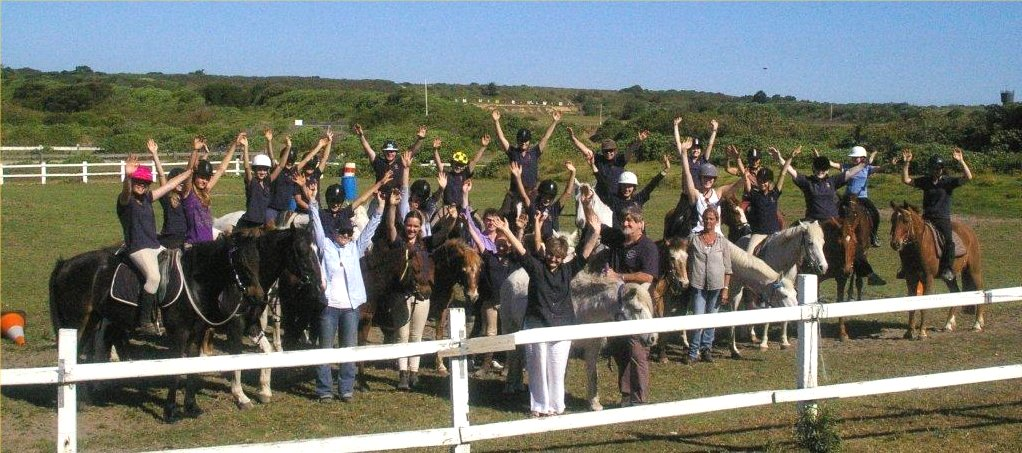
Malabar Riding School

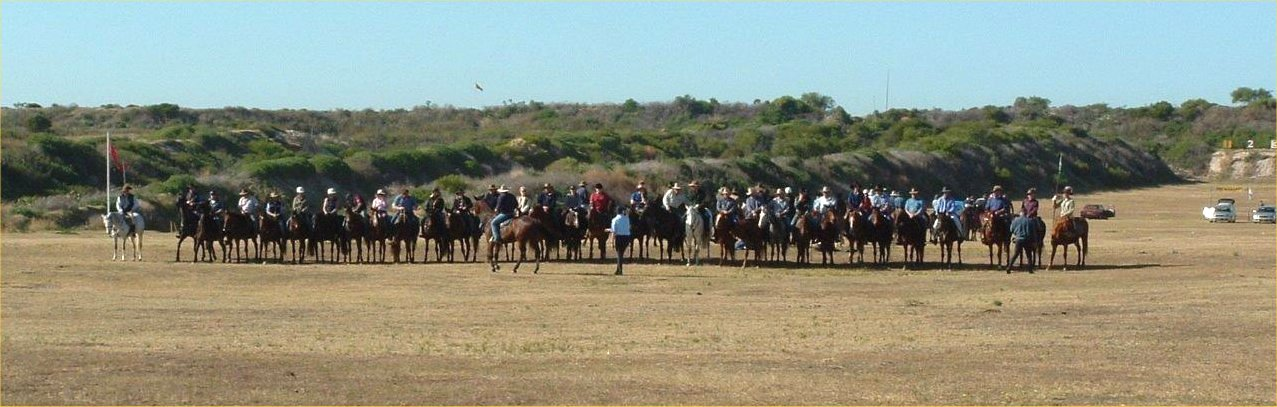
Malabar Riding School

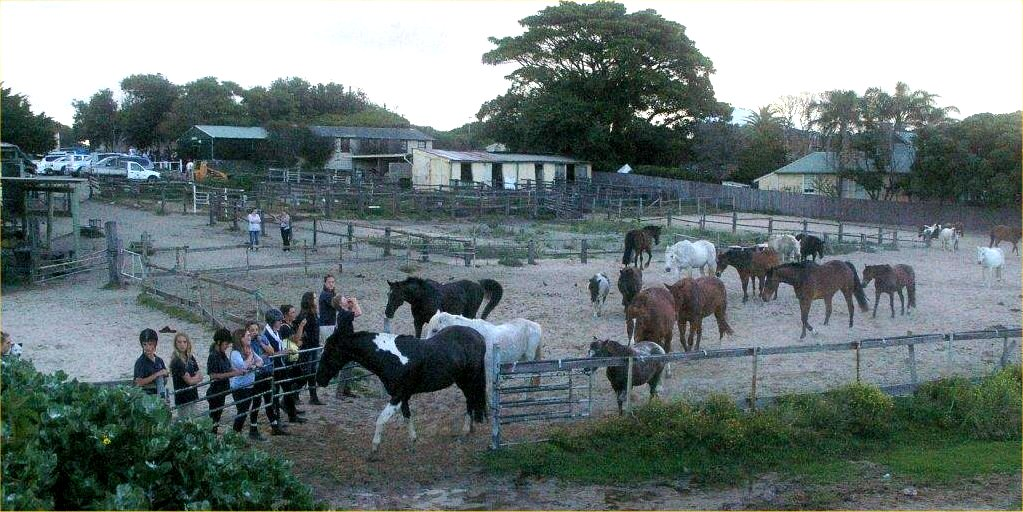
Malabar Riding School

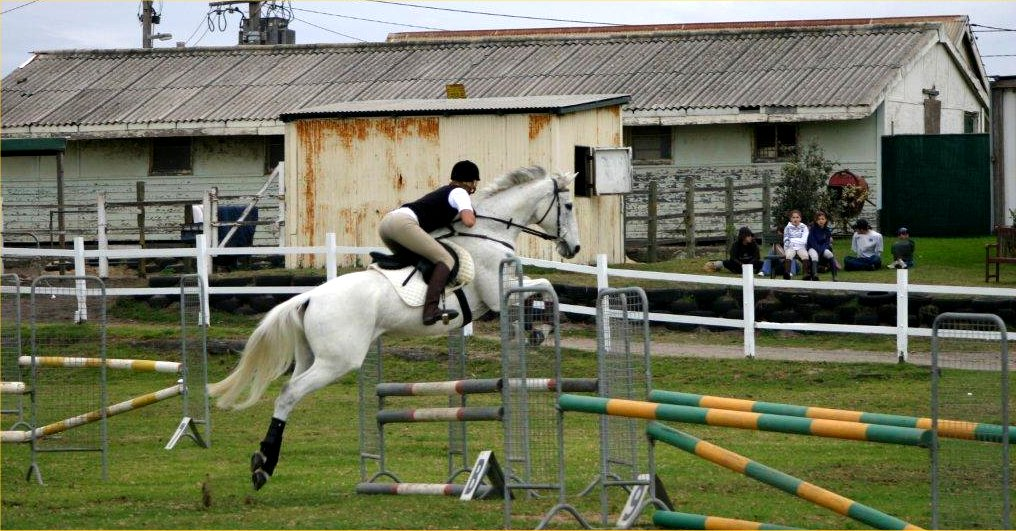
Malabar Riding School

The rifle range caretaker's cottage was built around 1890. The heritage cottage, horse stables and army huts were demolished by the federal government in October 2012.

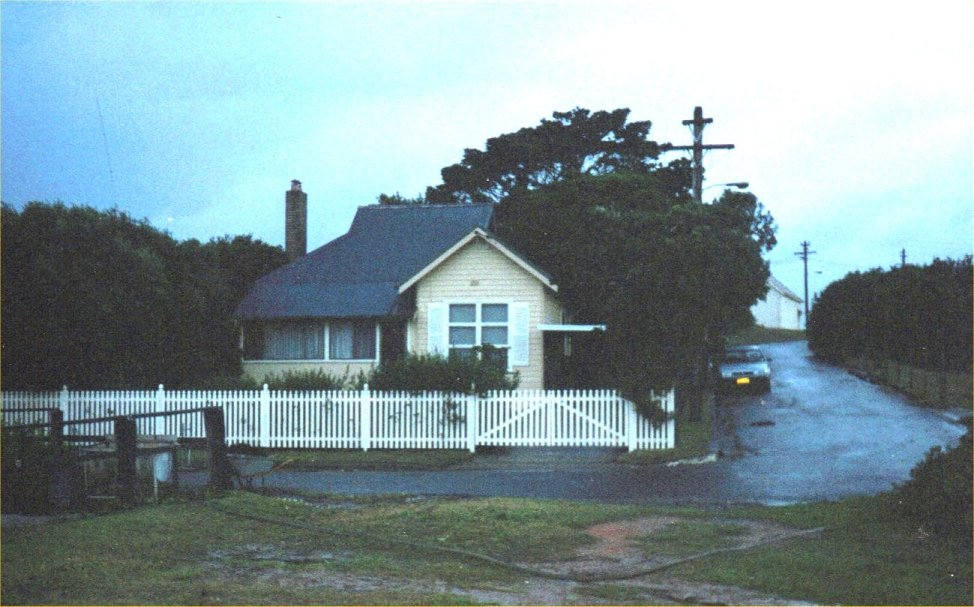
Former caretaker's cottage

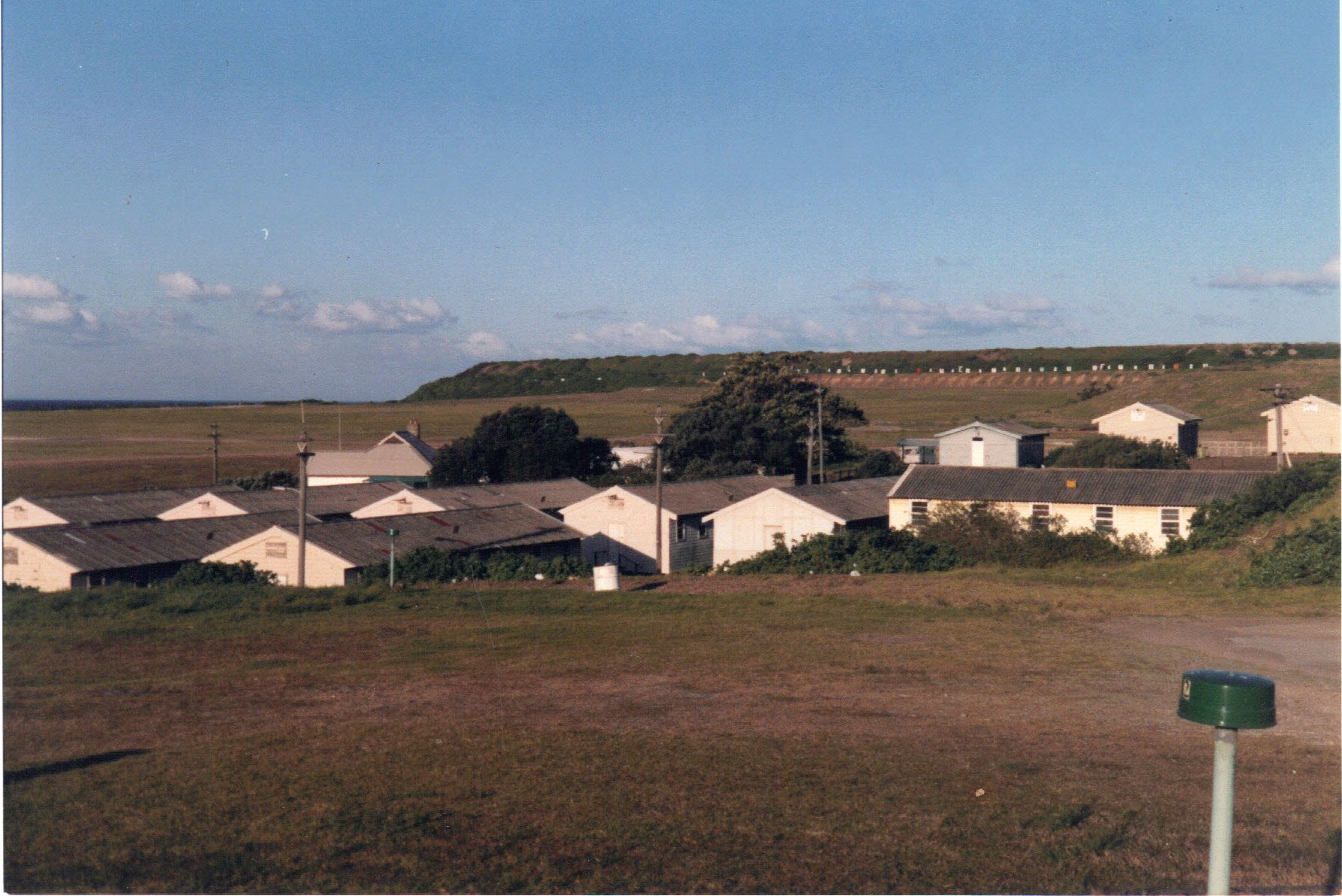
Former Army huts

=== Australian Light Horse and the Reserve Forces Day Parade ===
In the latter part of 1884 the venerable citizens of Sydney came together to form a cavalry unit. Initially they met in the Oxford Hotel located in Queen's Square. They then went on to train at Moore Park and the Malabar Headland. The Australian Light Horse have a historical attachment to the Malabar Headland which dates back over 100 years. The training for the Australian Light Horse involvement in the Reserve Forces Day Parade has been conducted at the headland for almost a decade. The Australian Light Horse Association provide Mounted Vice-Regal Escorts in Sydney for the governor of NSW, Professor Marie Bashir AC and for Her Excellency Ms Quentin Bryce, AC the governor-general of the Commonwealth of Australia.

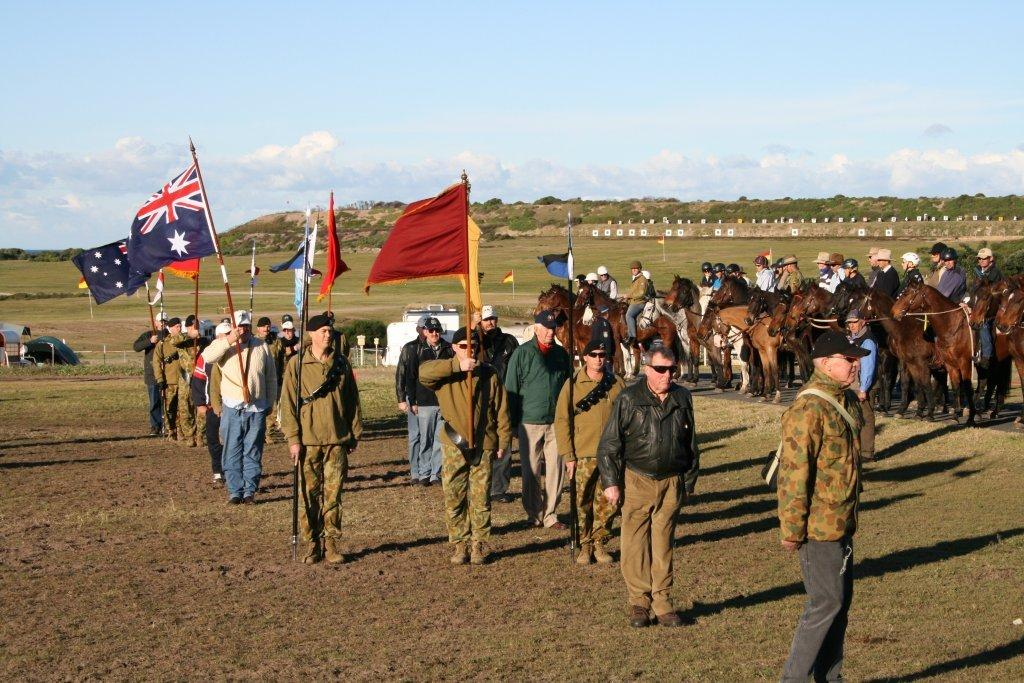
Reserve Forces Day Parade

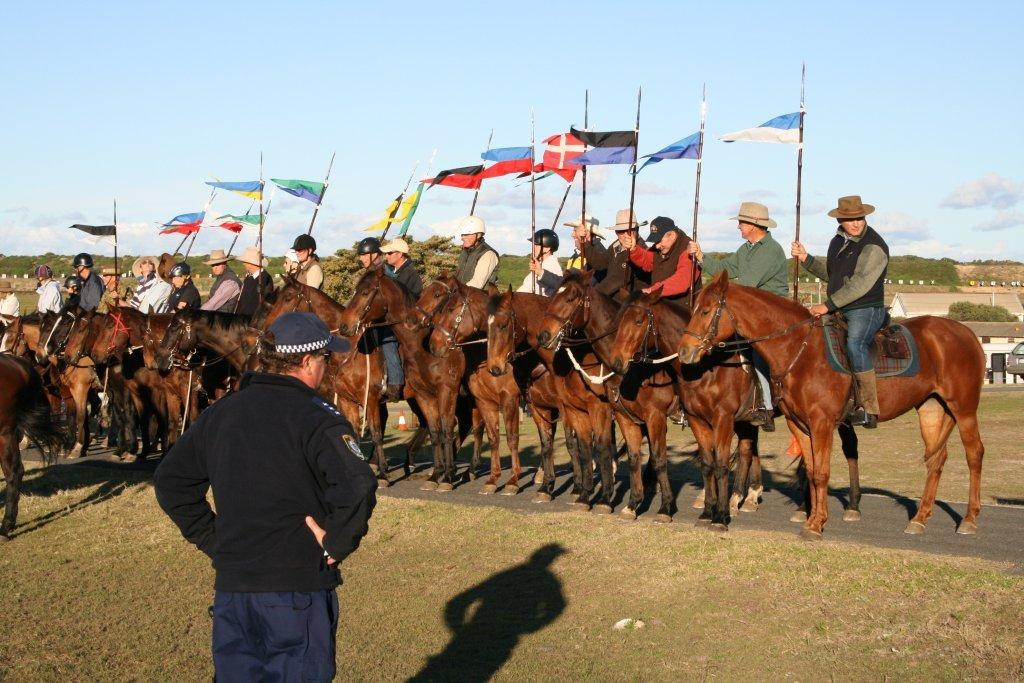
Reserve Forces Day Parade

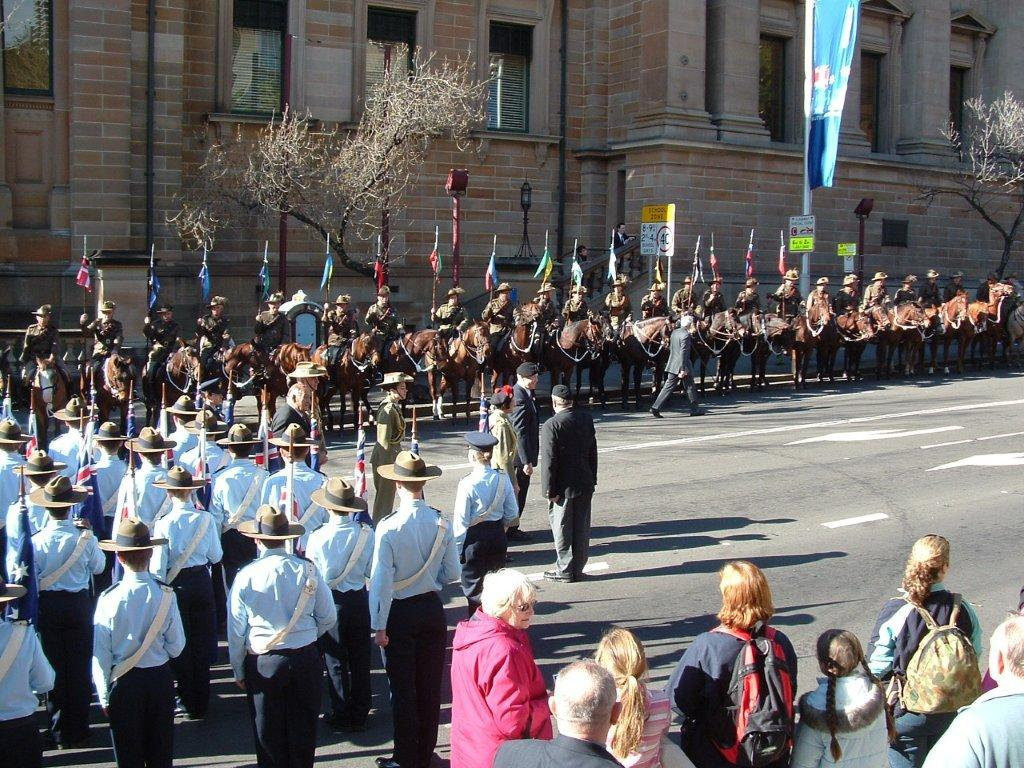
Australian Light Horse Parade

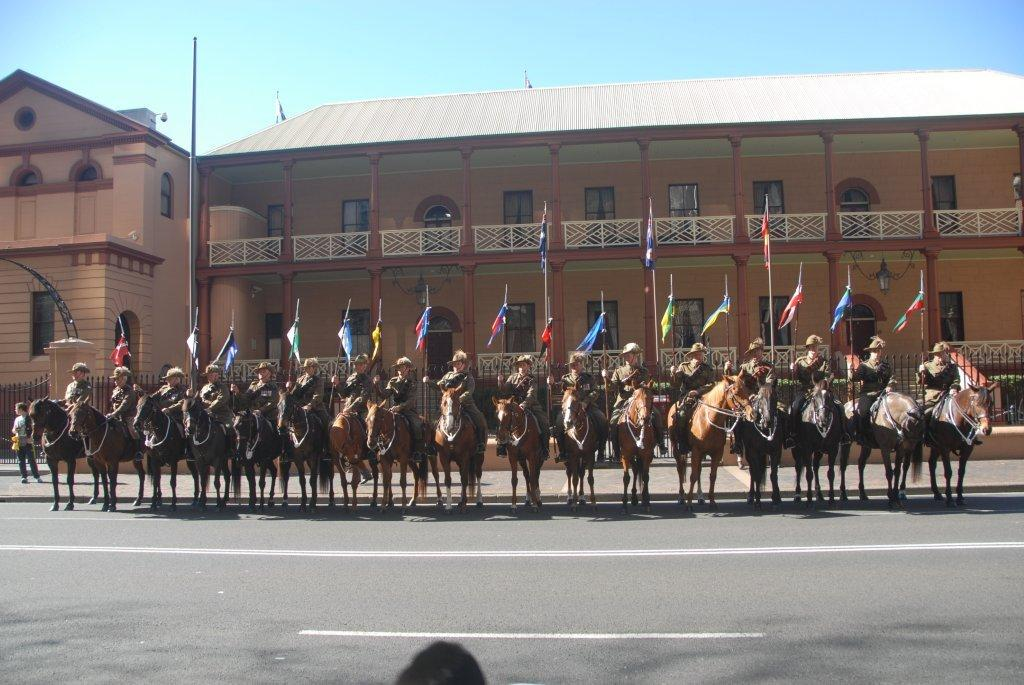
Australian Light Horse Parade

=== Great Public School Rifle Clubs ===
The Athletic Association of the Great Public Schools of New South Wales (AAGPS, also known as GPS or Great Public Schools) is an association of mostly private boys schools in New South Wales formed in 1892 currently comprising King's School, Sydney Grammar School, Newington College, Saint Ignatius' College, St Joseph's College, Sydney Boys High School, Sydney Church of England Grammar School (Shore), Scots College and Armidale School. Several GPS Rifle Clubs have used the Malabar rifle range since the 1920s competing for the Rawson Cup, the NRA Shield, the Buchanan Shield and the GPS Premiership. Sydney Boys High School started with cadet shooting in 1883, they were granted permission to shoot at Malabar in the 1920s. Sydney Grammar School was founded in 1854 and used the Malabar rifle range until 2011. Scots College Rifle Club was formed in 1922 and has a membership of 60-70 members. Scots College continue to use the ANZAC Rifle Range to this day.

=== Full Bore Rifle Range ===
The Full Bore range is used for the long distance, 300 metre to 800 metre, target shooting disciplines using precision target rifles fitted with aperture (peep) or telescopic sights. The term Full Bore refers to the military calibres including; .303 British, 7.62×51mm NATO / .308 Winchester and 5.56×45mm NATO / .223 Remington as sanctioned by the NRAA rules although other calibres are also used. This range is used for national and international target rifle competitions, the most notable of which was the Australian Bicentenary Celebrations attended by approximately 900 competitors from Australia, Great Britain, Canada, New Zealand, Channel Islands, Scotland, USA, Wales and Kenya in 1988. Two matches were held, The Australia Match (formerly The Empire Match) on 14 April 1988 and the US Palma Match on 16 April 1988 with a prize of $100,000 and the Palma Trophy. The range also hosts the annual NSW Queen's prize competition. The Queen's Prize was originally sponsored by Queen Victoria in 1860, the competition has been held annually (with the exception of the war years) by "The Empire" countries and all states in Australia since 1878.

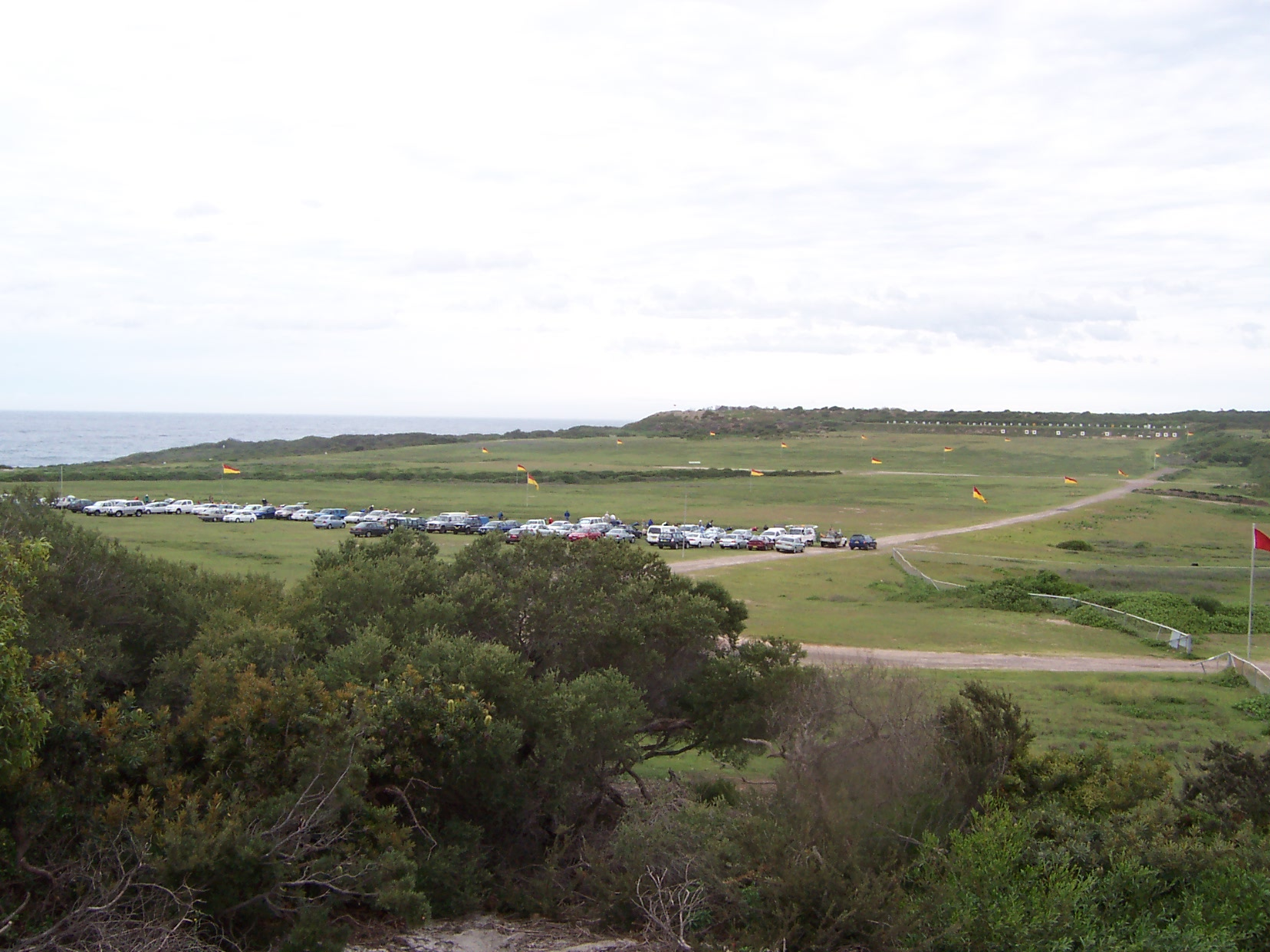
Malabar Full Bore Range

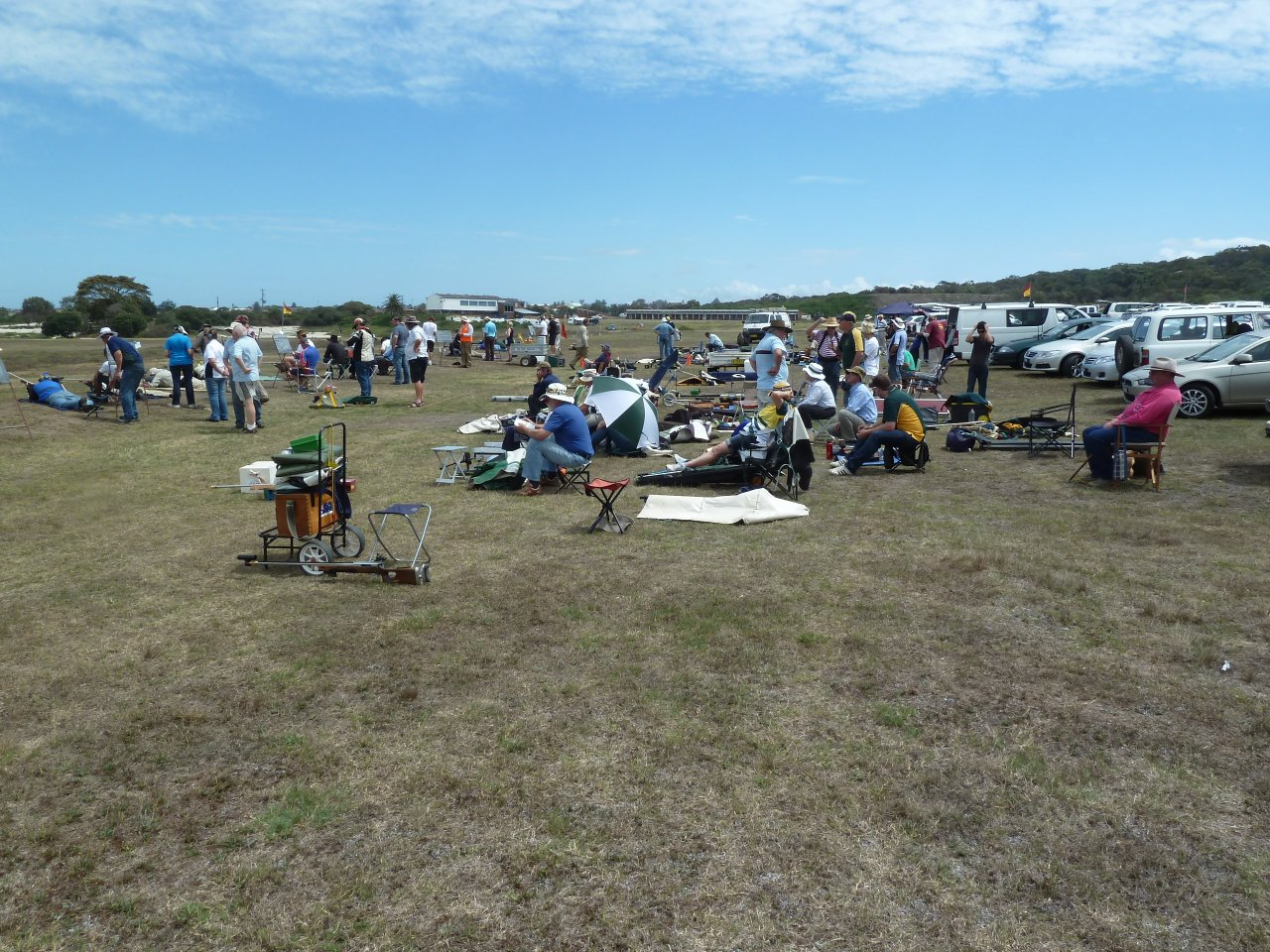
Malabar Full Bore Range

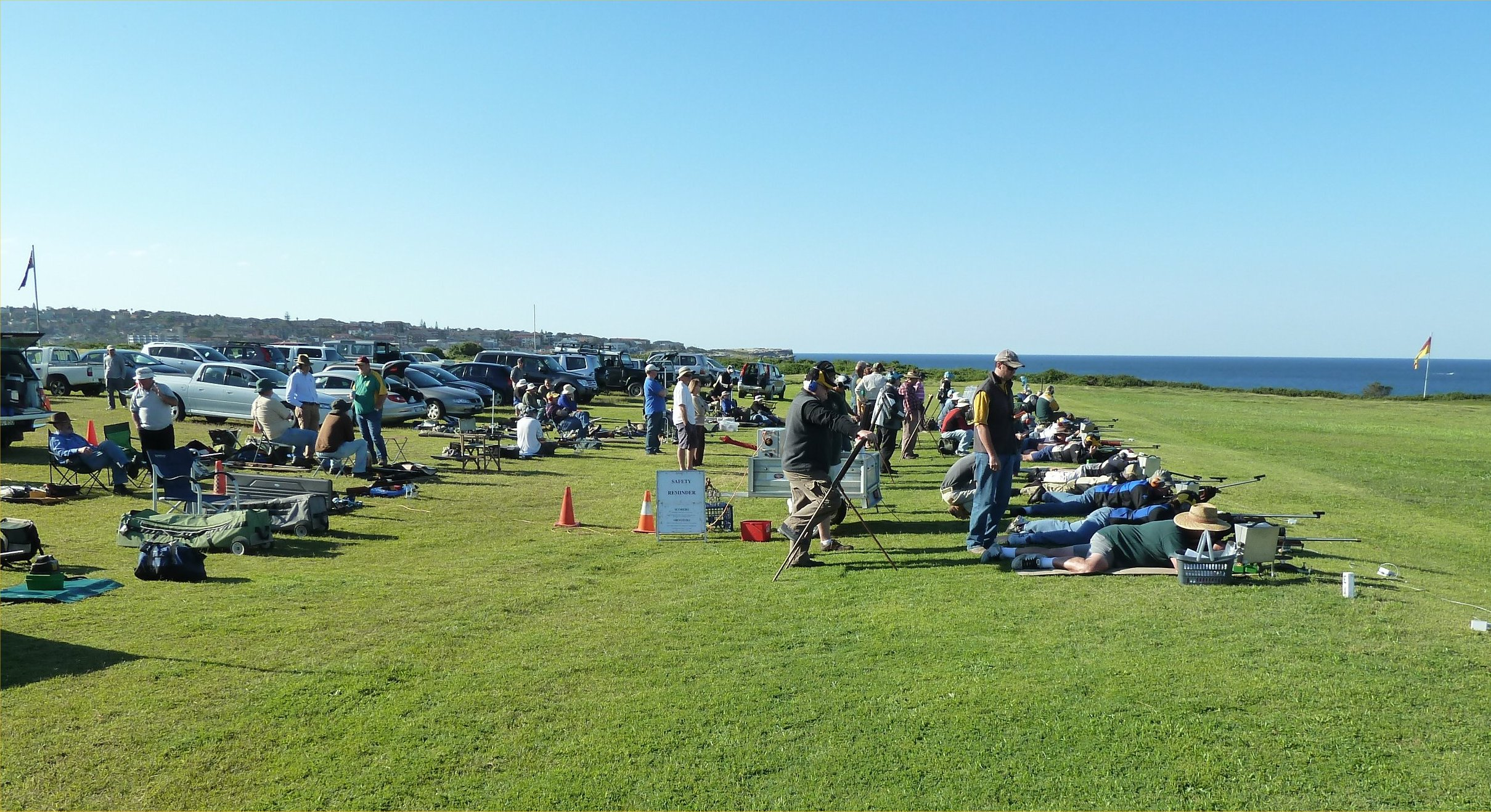
Malabar Full Bore Range ANZAC Day Comp

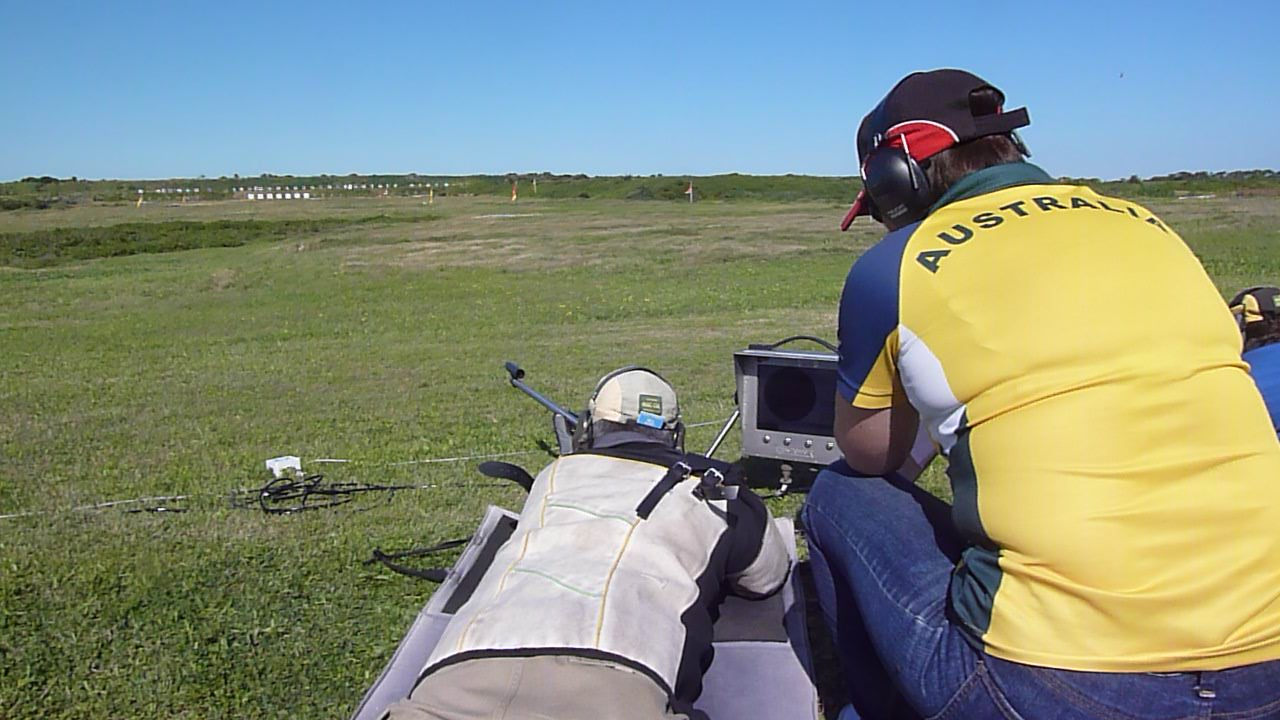
Malabar Full Bore Range ANZAC Day Comp

=== Military Rifle Club Range ===
"The Military Rifle Clubs Association (previously known as the NSW Citizens Forces Rifle Association) are a group of rifle clubs who have been shooting Service Rifle competitions on the Malabar headland since 1923. The competitions are shot at 100, 200 and 300 metres in the standing, sitting, kneeling and prone positions. The firearms used were predominantly semi-automatic, such as the SLR, up to the ban by the federal government and bolt-action military rifles from WWI and WWII such as the Short Magazine Lee–Enfield (S.M.L.E.) No.1 and No. 5, The Rifle No. 4, various Mauser rifles and Springfields etc."

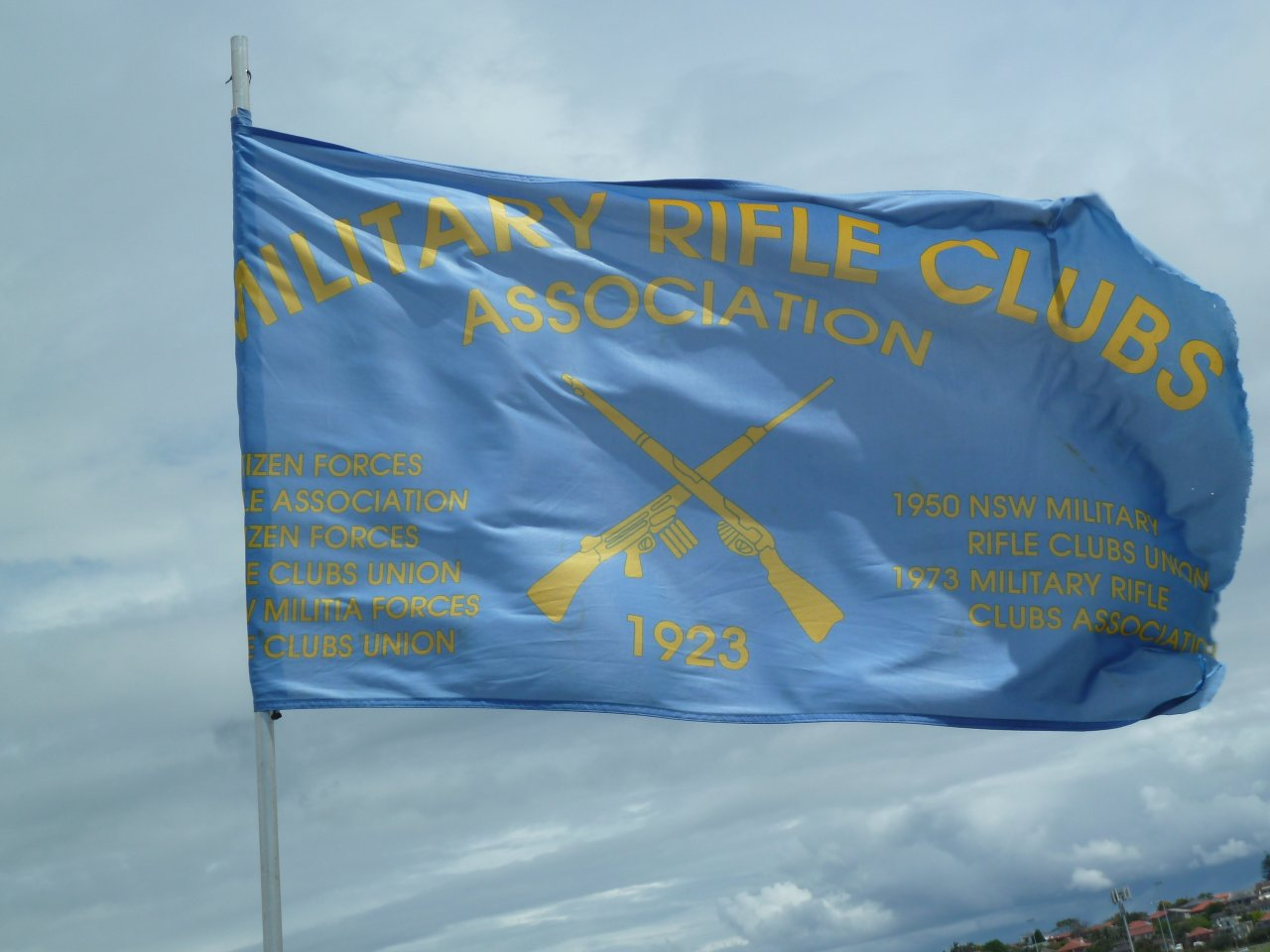
Malabar Military Rifle Clubs

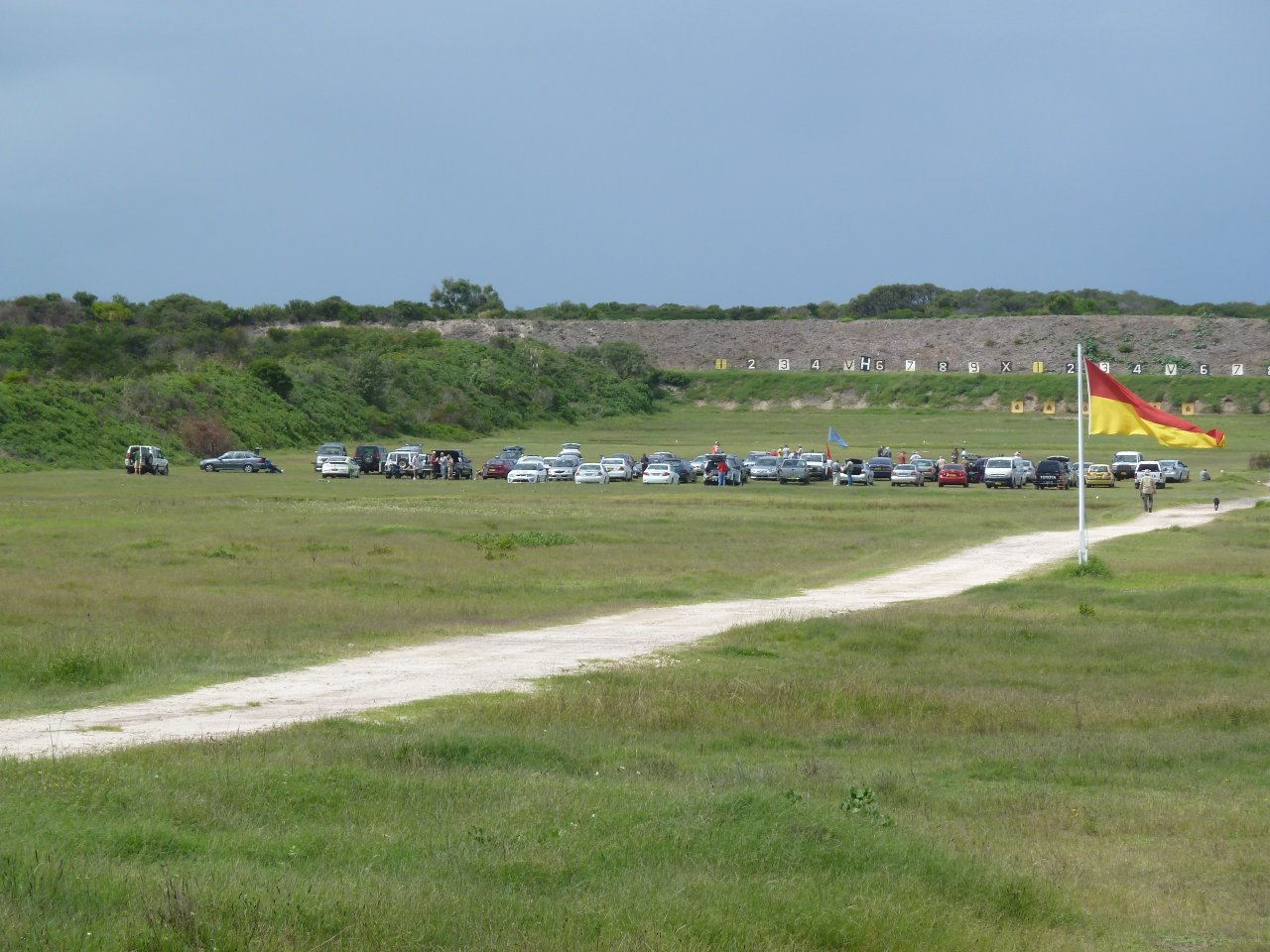
Malabar Military Rifle Clubs

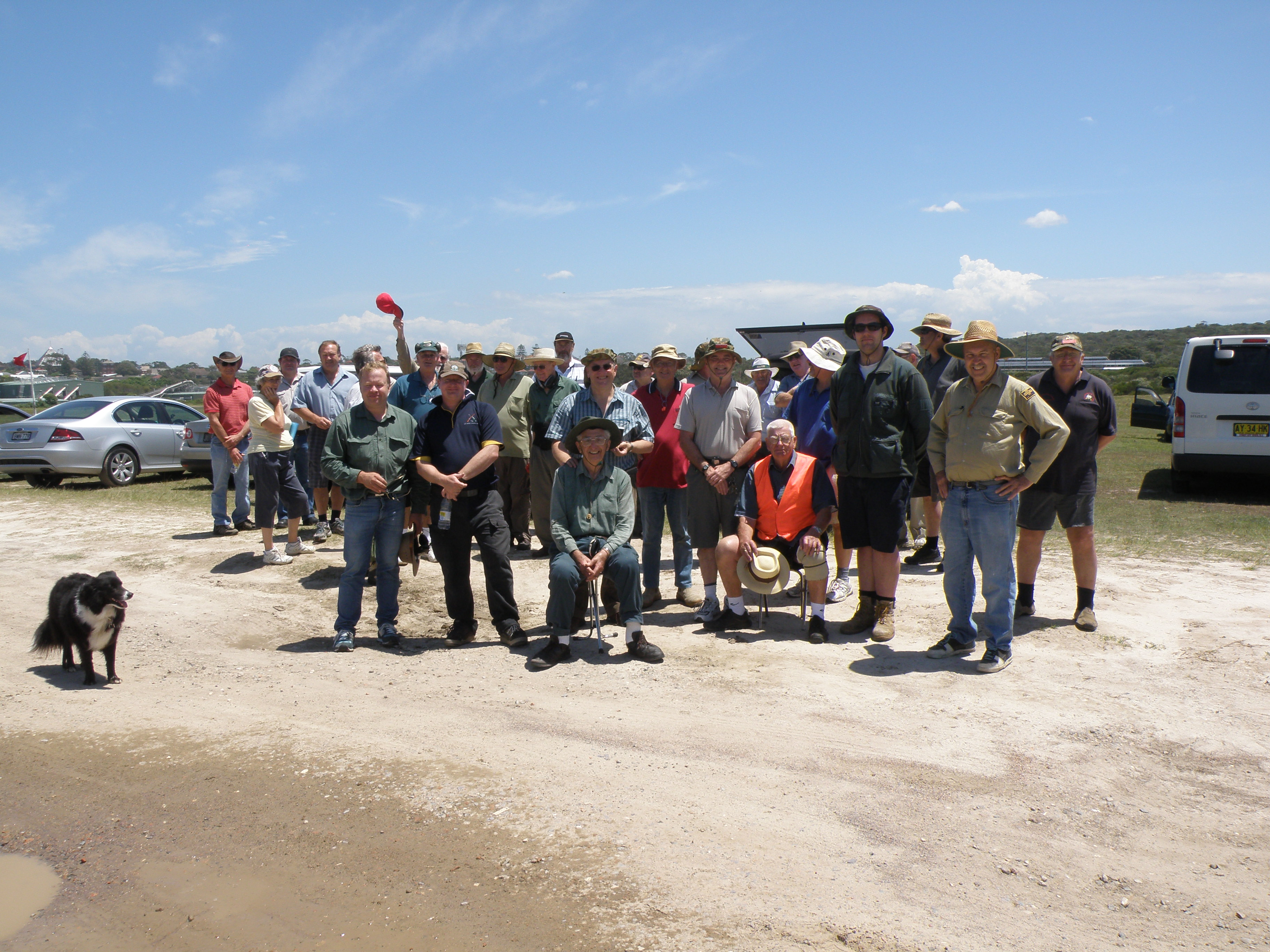
Malabar Military Rifle Clubs

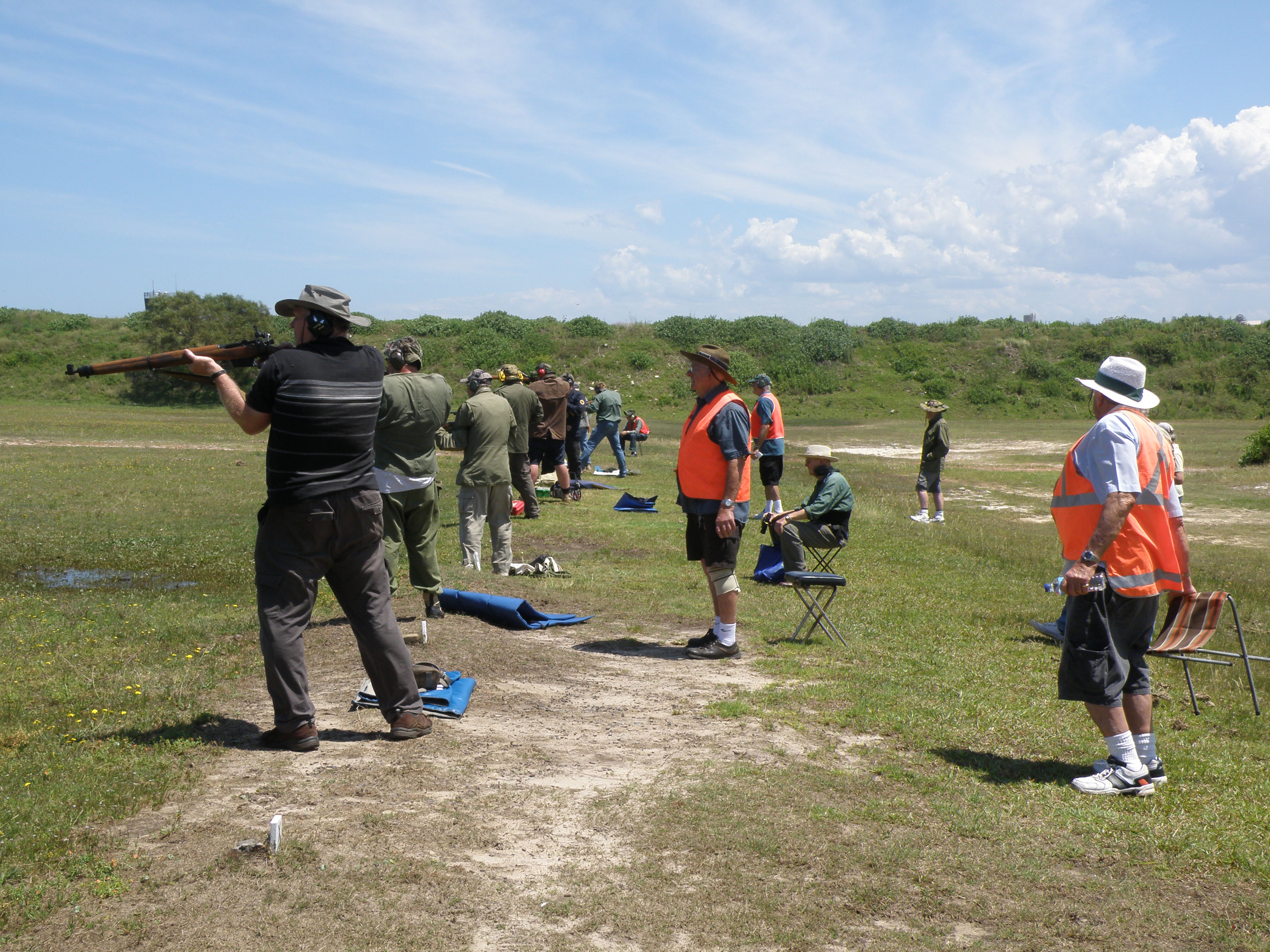
Malabar Military Rifle Clubs

=== Former SSAA Rifle Range ===
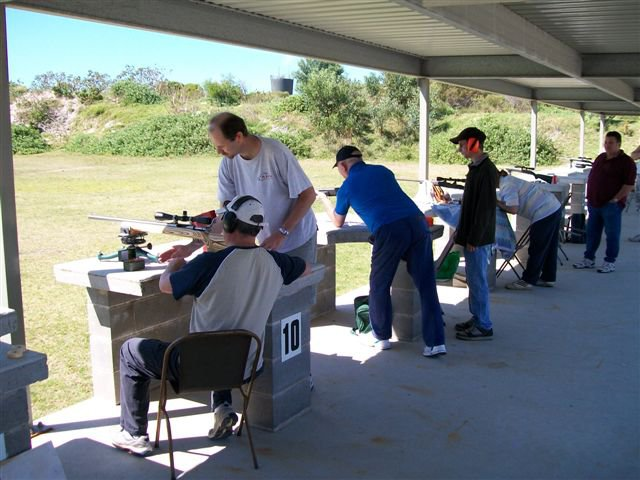
Malabar Bench Rest Rifle Range

The Sporting Shooters Association of Australia operated on the Malabar headland from 1975 until their lease was terminated by the federal government in November 2011. The SSAA range was located on the southern end of the ANZAC Rifle Range. This area provided facilities for shotgun clay target shooting, metallic silhouette and bench rest rifle shooting. The bench rest stands were used for sighting in rifles and for precision bench rest target shooting at 100 metres. The bench rest range facilities were demolished by the federal labor government in October 2012.

=== Former Smallbore Rifle Range ===
The Smallbore Range was used by clubs associated with the NSW Smallbore and Air Rifle Association until their lease was terminated by the federal government in November 2011. The term "smallbore" refers to the 5.56 / 0.22 and 4.5 / 0.177 calibres, with the latter being predominantly air rifle. This range was used by shooters competing in the 50-metre bench rest, prone and three-position (standing, kneeling, prone) rifle shooting disciplines. The Smallbore and Air Rifle Range facilities were demolished by the federal government in October 2012.

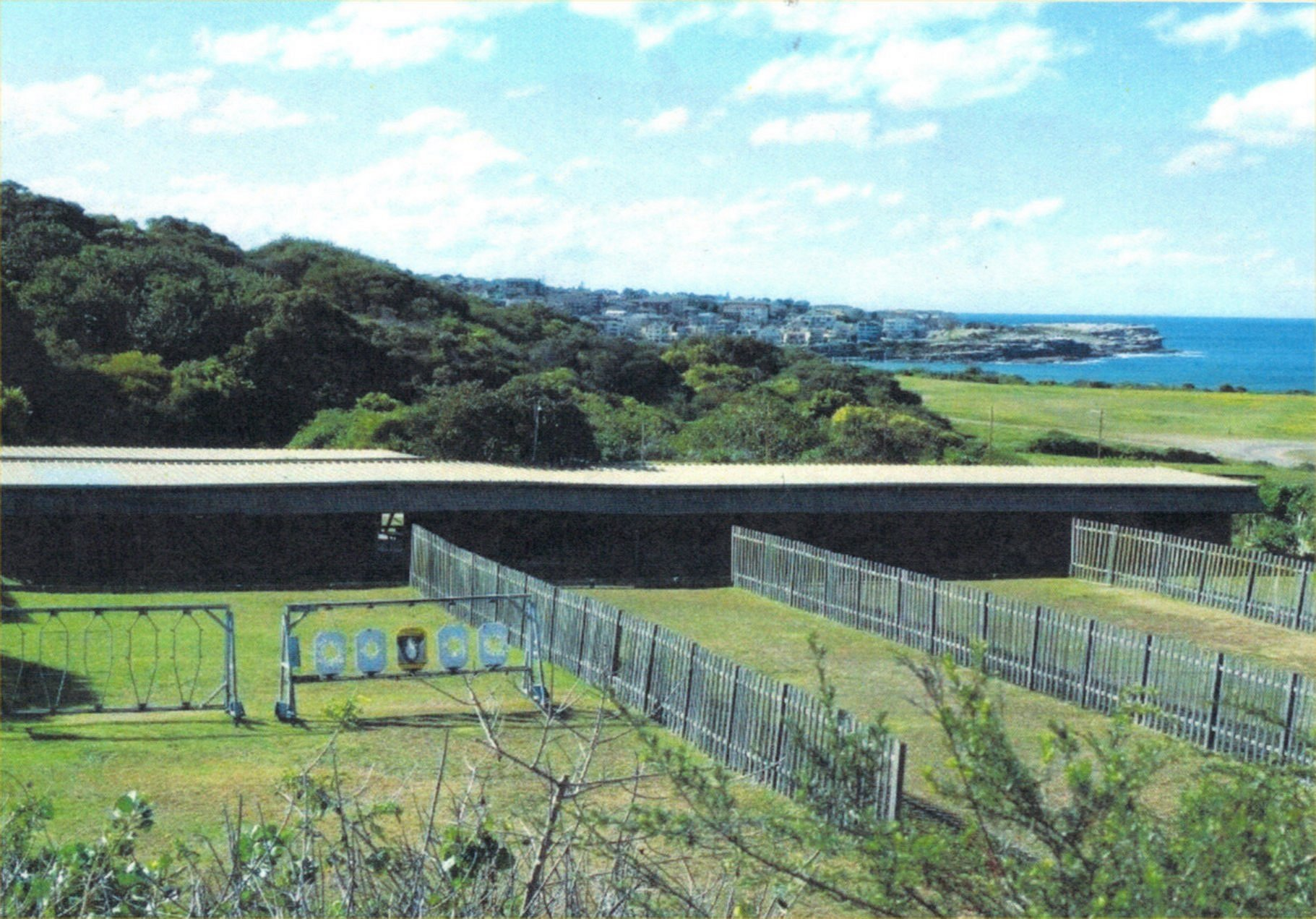
Malabar Smallbore Rifle Range

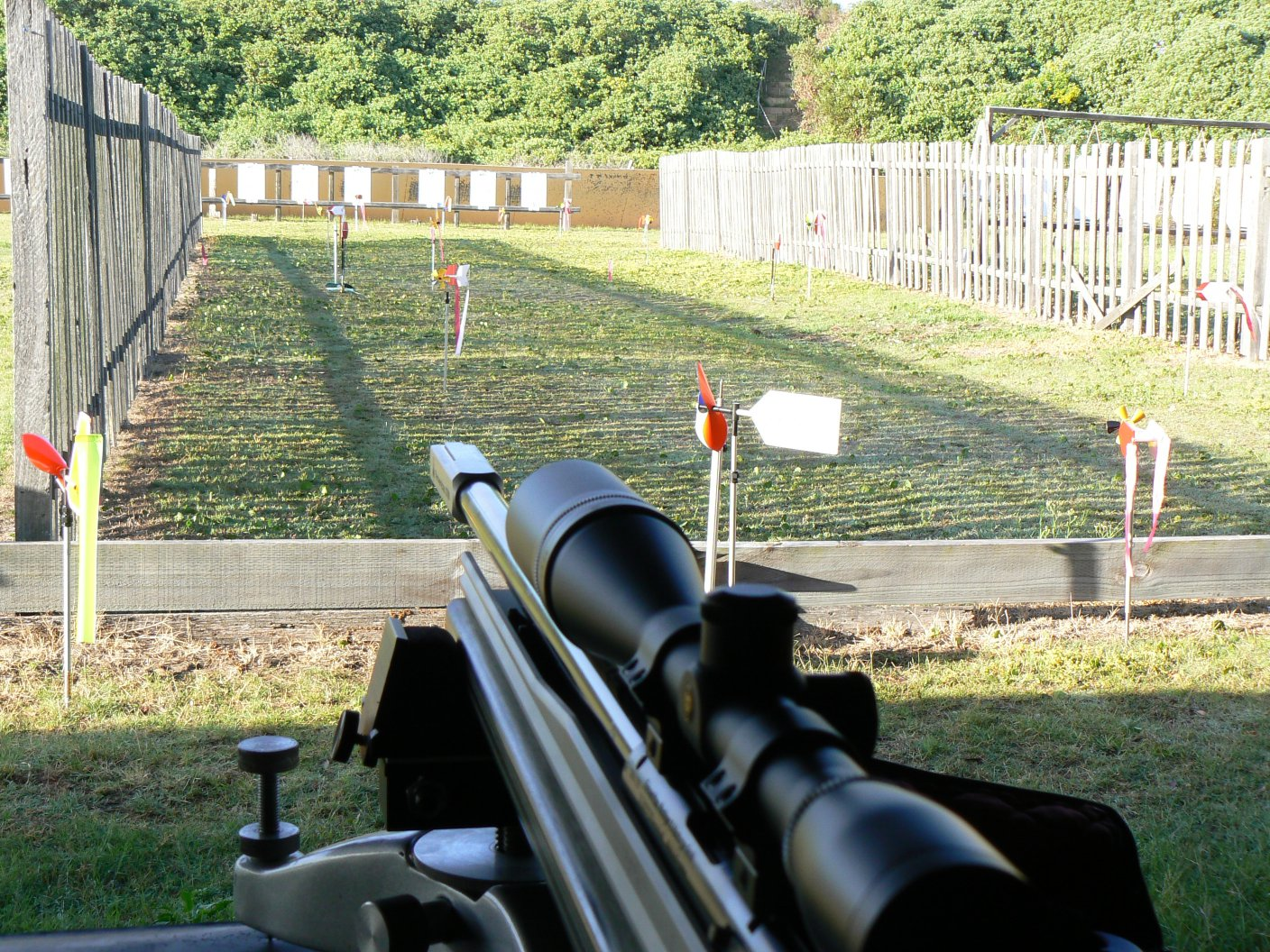
Malabar Smallbore Rifle Range

=== Pistol range ===
The pistol range is used for ISPC pistol and rimfire metallic silhouette competitions.

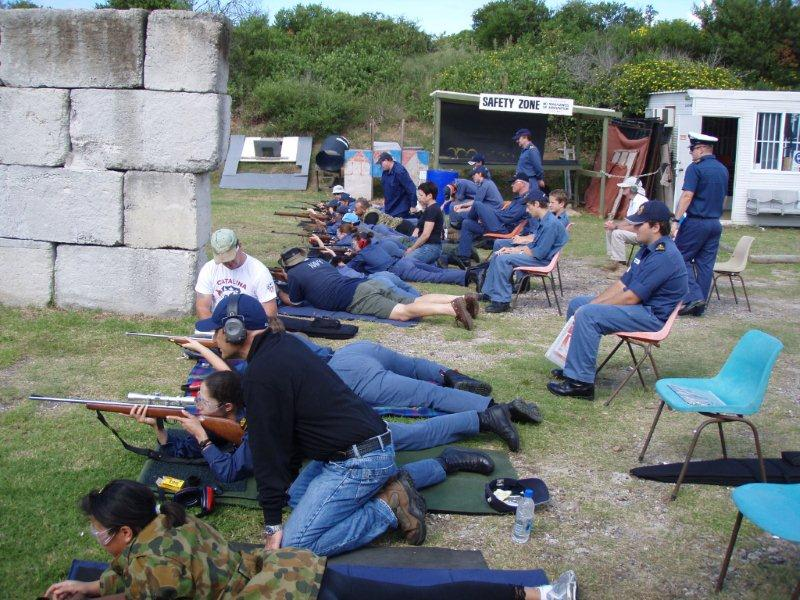
Rifle shooting

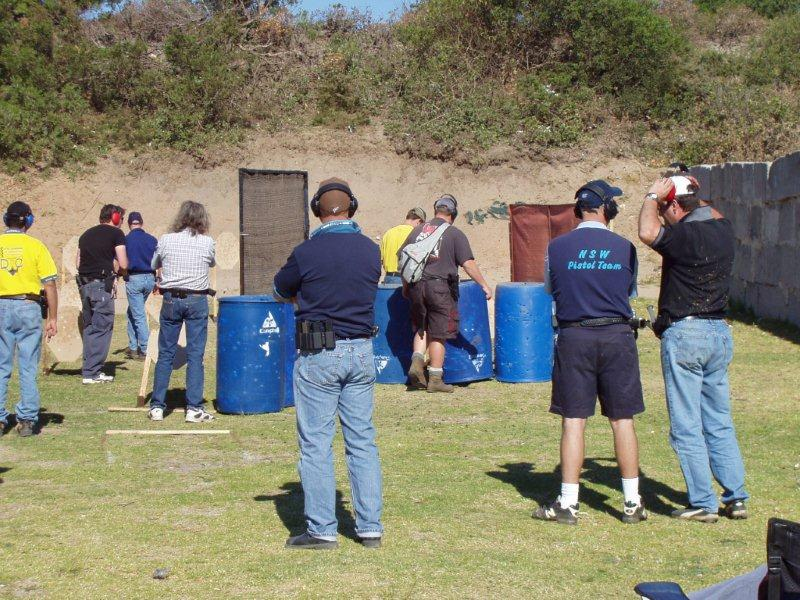
Pistol shooting

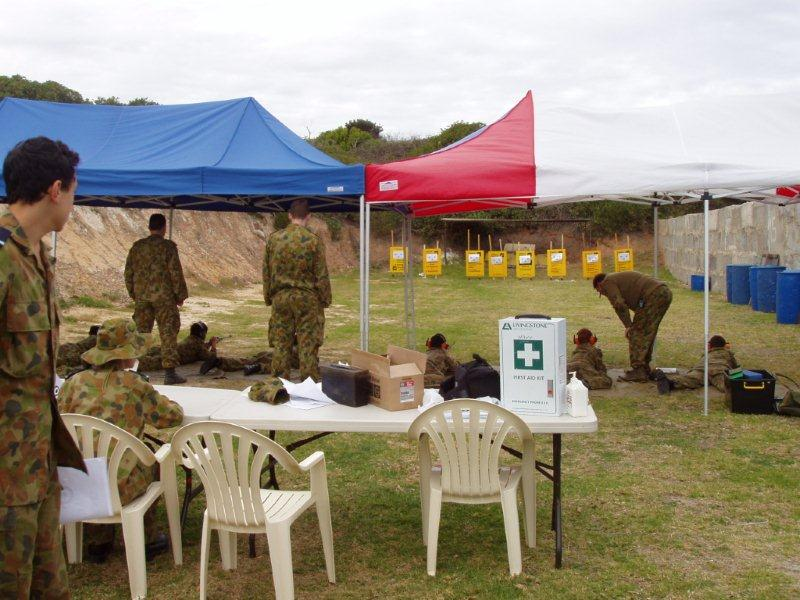
Army Cadets

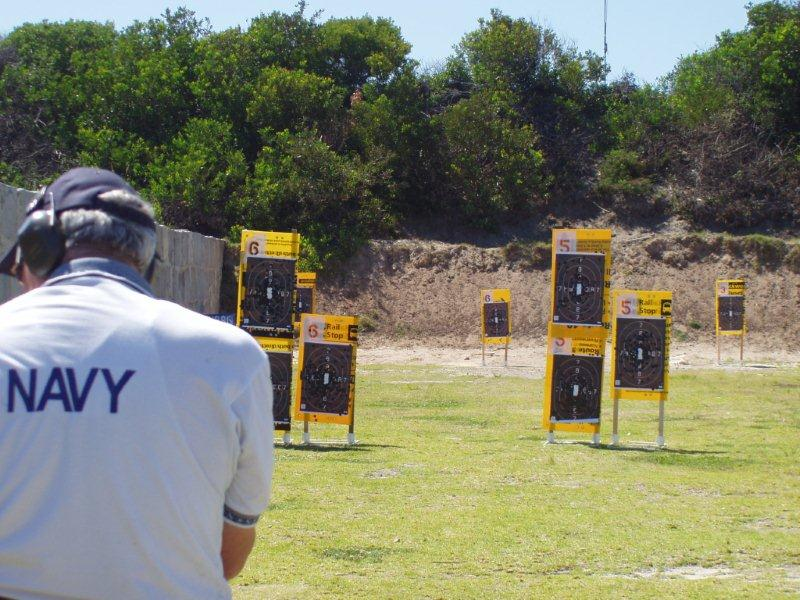
Pistol shooting

=== ANZAC Memorial Gates ===
The Long Bay Rifle Range at Malabar was renamed the "ANZAC Rifle Range" by the Army in 1970 to commemorate the Australian Rifle Club members who served during the two World Wars and the Korean Campaign. The National Rifle Association records show that as of 31 December 1916, 6486 members of the NSW Rifle Clubs had enlisted for active service during WWI. The total number of Australian Rifle Club members who enlisted for WWII is believed to be between 33,000 and 38,000. The "Memorial Gates" are dedicated to the "Fallen Riflemen" of these wars.

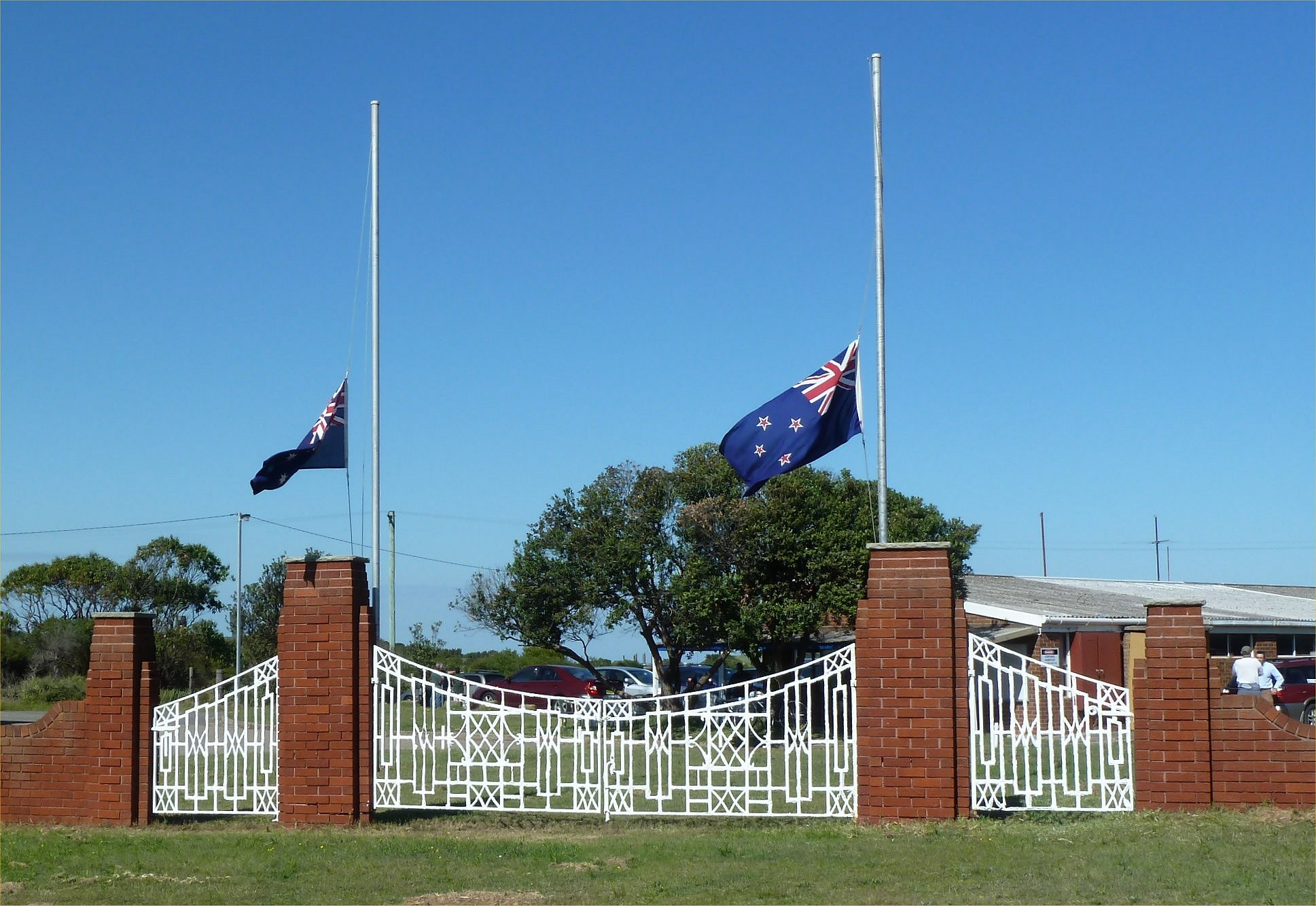
ANZAC Range Memorial Gates

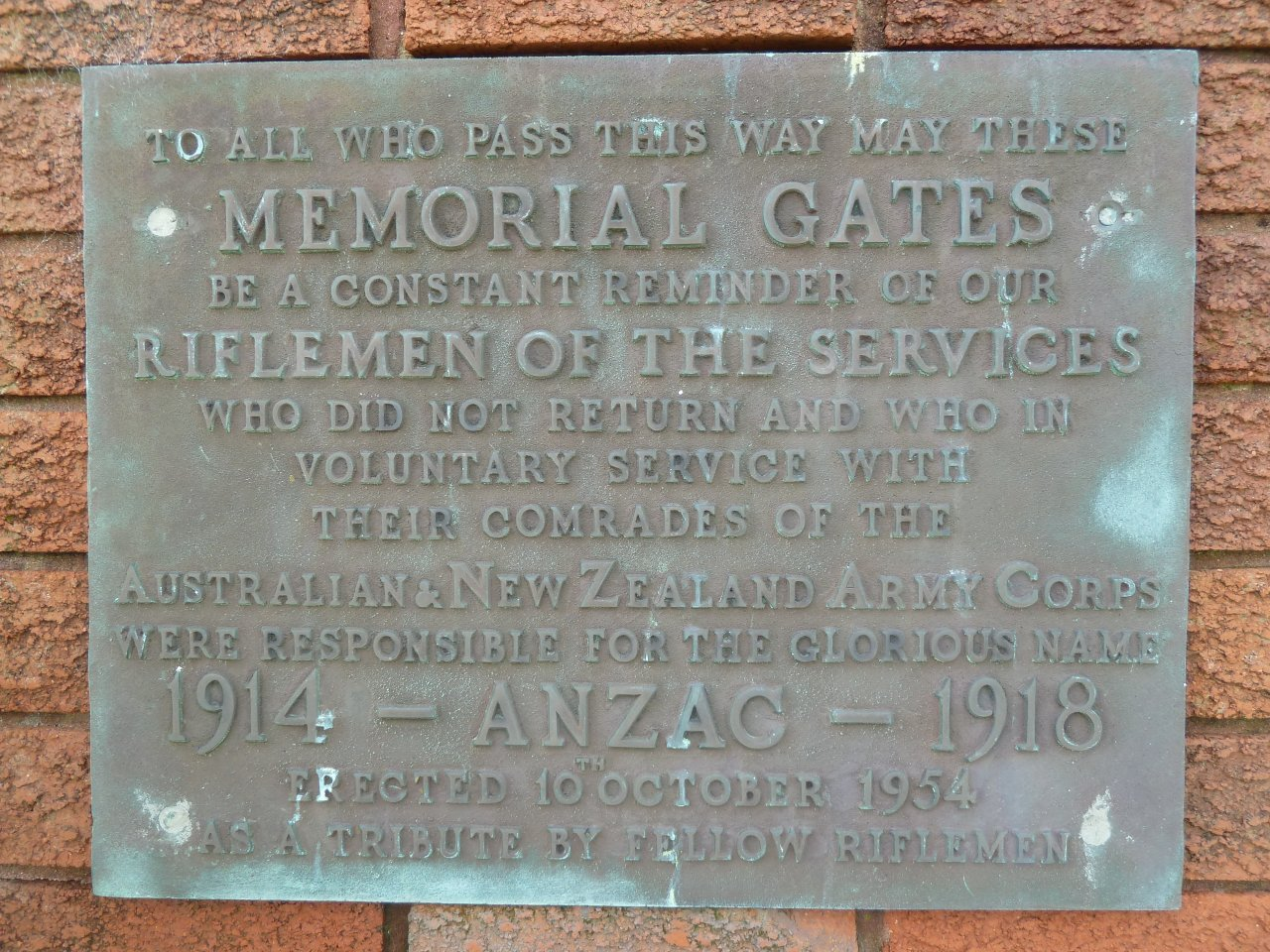
ANZAC Range Memorial Gates WWI Plaque

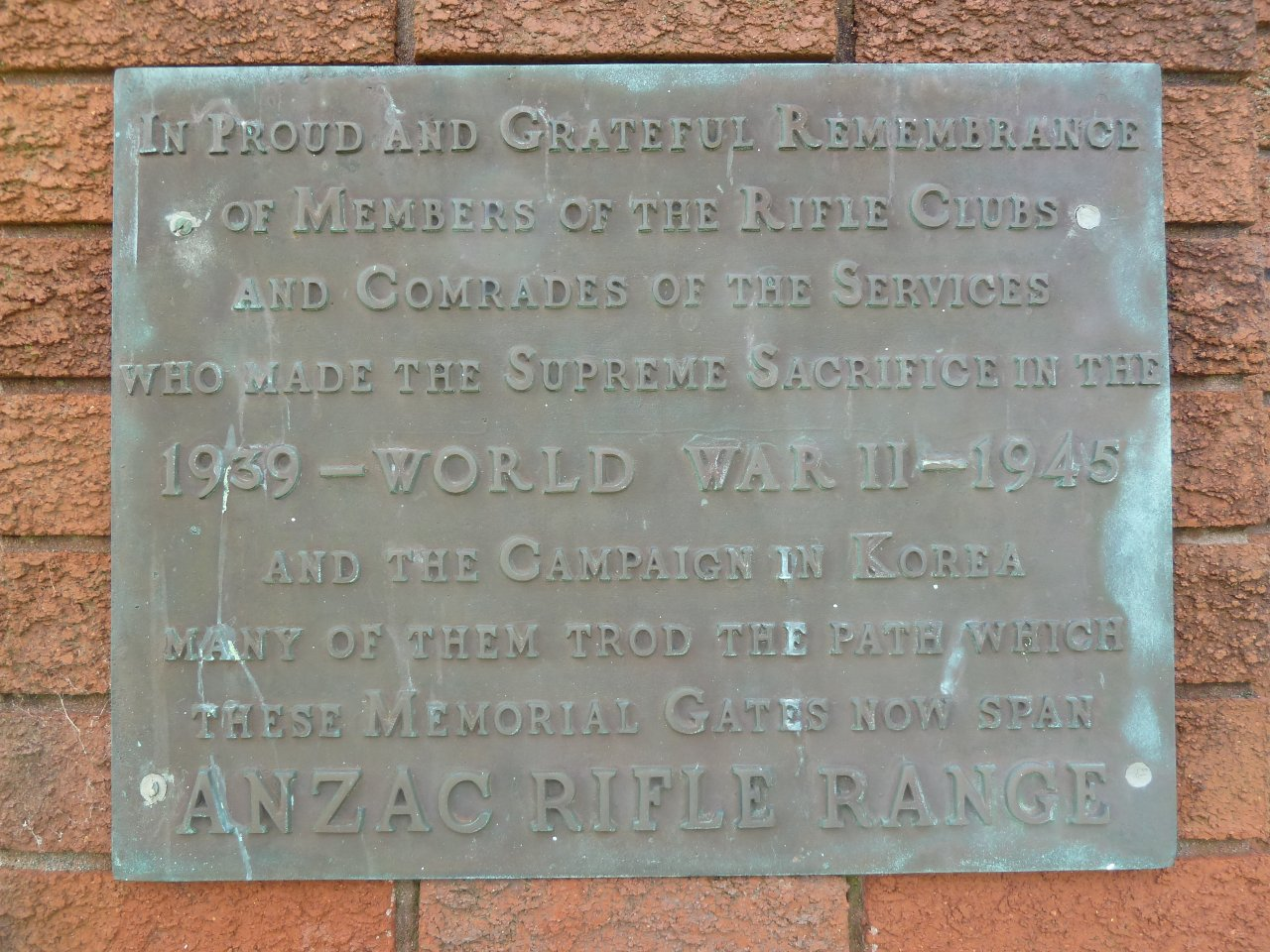
ANZAC Range Memorial Gates WWII Plaque

=== ANZAC Range Memorial Plaques ===
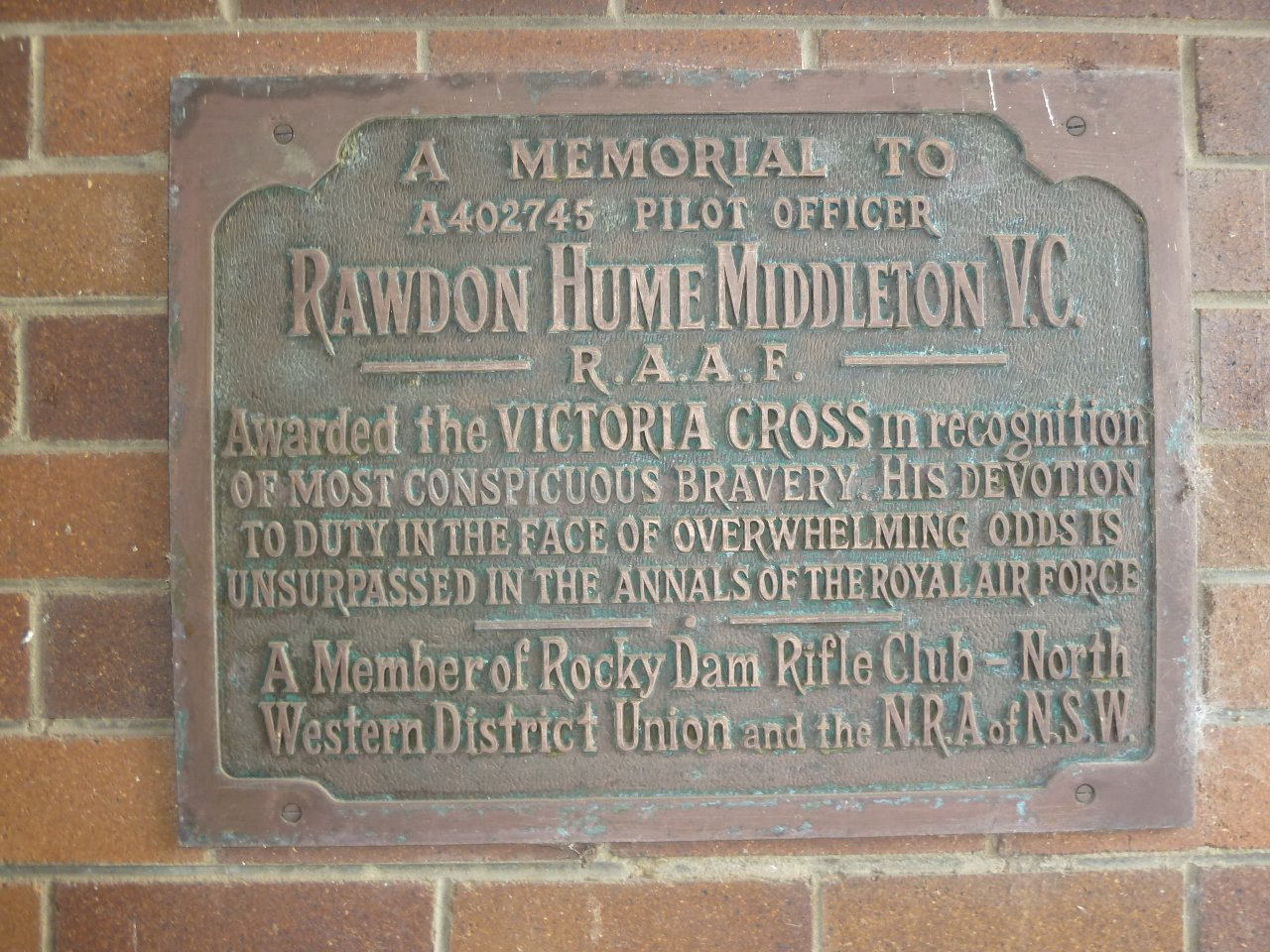
ANZAC Range Memorial Plaque

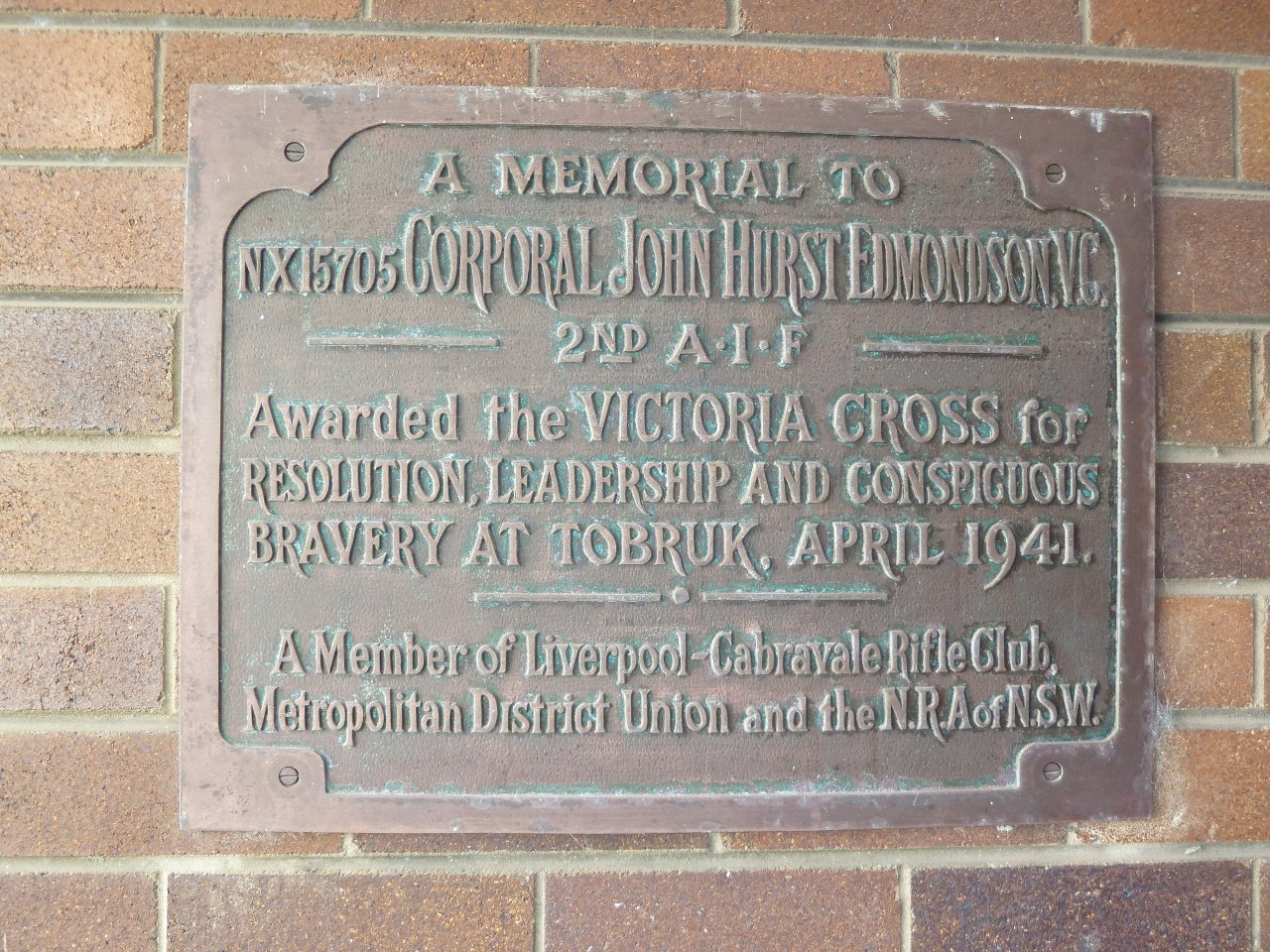
ANZAC Range Memorial Plaque

=== NSW Rifle Club Members Awarded the Victoria Cross ===
The Victoria Cross (VC) is the highest military decoration awarded for valour "in the face of the enemy".

Private George Cartwright (VC)
Near Peronne France
31 August 1918
4th Battalion Rifle Club

Corporal Arthur Charles Hall (VC)
Peronne France
1–2 September 1918
Coolabah Rifle Club

Lieutenant Arthur Roden Cutler (VC)
Merdjayoun-Damour, Lebanon
19 June – 6 July 1941
Manly Rifle Club

Corporal John Hurst Edmondson (VC)
Tobruk Libya
13 April 1941
Liverpool Cabravale Rifle Club

Flight Lieutenant Rawdon Hume Middleton RAAF (VC)
Italy 28–29 November 1942
Rocky Dam Rifle Club

Captain Alfred Shout (VC)
Lone Pine Gallipoli
9 August 1915
Australian Rifles Regiment

=== NSW Rifle Club Members Awarded the George Cross ===
The George Cross (GC) is an award for civilians; it is the second highest award of the United Kingdom honours system, ranking immediately after the Victoria Cross.

Benjamin Gower Hardy (GC)
Cowra NSW
4–5 August 1944
Rifle Club Chatswood Rifle Club

==== Military history ====
Details TBA

- See Malabar Battery

=== Clubs that no longer have access to the range ===
- Alpine Hunting & Target Shooting Club Pty Ltd
- Royal Australian Navy Rifle Reserve Club (RANRRC) – a multi-disciplinary club with a history dating back to some 70 years on the range.

== See also ==
- Aboriginal Cultural Heritage Act 2003
- Australian Light Horse
- Malabar Battery
