= Dryandra ser. Armatae =

Obsolete subgenus of plants

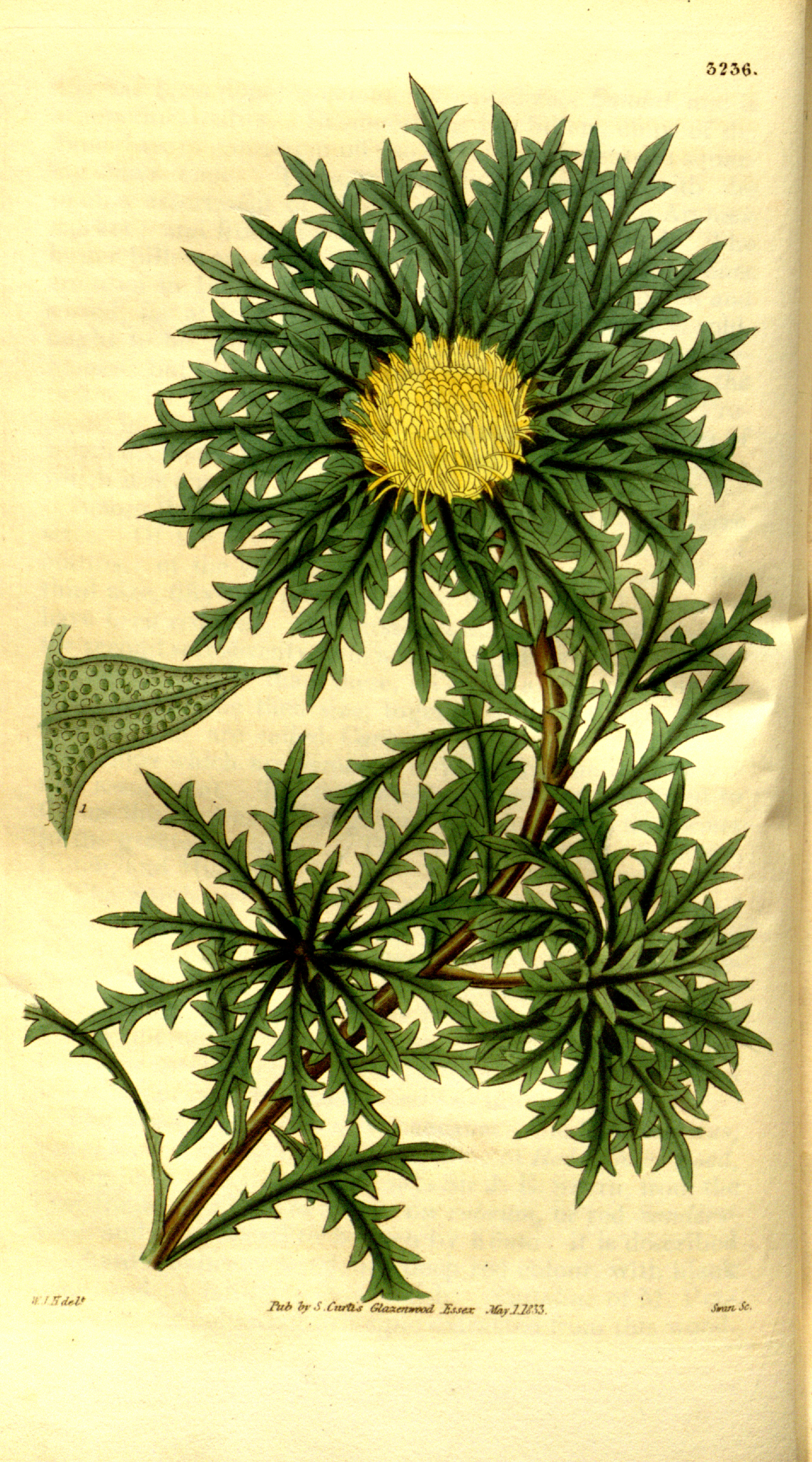
Banksia armata, formerly Dryandra armata

Dryandra ser. Armatae is an obsolete series within the former genus Dryandra (now Banksia ser. Dryandra). It was first published by George Bentham in 1870, and was given a new circumscription by Alex George in 1996, but was ultimately discarded in 2007 when Austin Mast and Kevin Thiele sunk Dryandra into Banksia.

== According to Bentham ==
Bentham's definition of D. ser. Armatae was "Flower-heads usually large, mostly terminal, enclosed in floral leaves longer than the flowers. Involucres broad. Perianths above 1 in. long. Stigmatic end of the style slender, often scarcely distinct. Leaves with prickly teeth or lobes.". The placement and circumscription of the series may be summarised as follows:

Dryandra (now Banksia ser. Dryandra)

D. sect. Eudryandra

D. ser. Armatæ

D. quercifolia (now B. heliantha)
D. praemorsa (now B. undata)
D. cuneata (now B. obovata)
D. falcata (now B. falcata)
D. armata (now B. armata)
D. longifolia (now B. prolata)
D. Fraseri (now B. fraseri)

D. ser. Floribundæ (5 species, 2 varieties)
D. ser. Concinnæ (4 species)
D. ser. Formosæ (5 species)
D. ser. Niveae (4 species, 2 varieties)
D. ser. Obvallatæ (12 species)
D. ser. Gymnocephalæ (3 species)

D. sect. Aphragma (7 species, 2 varieties)

== According to George ==
Bentham's arrangement stood until 1996, when Alex George published his revision of Dryandra. George gave D. ser. Armatae a different and somewhat broader circumscription, encompassing 20 species, including just four of the seven included there by Bentham. The species included are mostly erect shrubs with large conspicuous yellow flowers heads, easily detached follicles and a notched seed wing.

George's placement and circumscription of D. ser. Armatae, as amended in 1999 and 2005, may be summarised as follows:

Dryandra (now Banksia ser. Dryandra)

D. subg. Dryandra

D. ser. Floribundae (1 species, 4 varieties)
D. ser. Armatae

D. cuneata (now B. obovata)
D. fuscobractea (now B. fuscobractea)
D. armata (now B. armata)

D. armata var. armata (now B. armata var. armata)
D. armata var. ignicida (now B. armata var. ignicida)

D. prionotes (now B. prionophylla)
D. arborea (now B. arborea)
D. hirsuta (now B. hirta)
D. pallida (now B. pallida)
D. purdieana (now B. purdieana)
D. xylothemelia (now B. xylothemelia)
D. cirsioides (now B. cirsioides)
D. acanthopoda (now B. acanthopoda)
D. squarrosa (now B. squarrosa)

D. squarrosa subsp. squarrosa (now B. squarrosa subsp. squarrosa)
D. squarrosa subsp. argillacea (now B. squarrosa subsp. argillacea)

D. hewardiana (now B. hewardiana)
D. wonganensis (now B. wonganensis)
D. trifontinalis (now B. trifontinalis)
D. stricta (now B. strictifolia)
D. echinata (now B. echinata)
D. polycephala (now B. polycephala)
D. subpinnatifida (now B. subpinnatifida)

D. subpinnatifida var. subpinnatifida (now B. subpinnatifida var. subpinnatifida)
D. subpinnatifida var. imberbis (now B. subpinnatifida var. imberbis)

D. longifolia (now B. prolata)

D. longifolia subsp. longifolia (now B. prolata subsp. prolata)
D. longifolia subsp. calcicola (now B. prolata subsp. calcicola)
D. longifolia subsp. archeos (now B. prolata subsp. archeos)

D. borealis (now B. borealis)

D. borealis subsp. borealis (now B. borealis subsp. borealis)
D. borealis subsp. elatior (now B. borealis subsp. elatior)

D. ser. Marginatae (1 species)
D. ser. Folliculosae (1 species, 5 varieties)
D. ser. Acrodontae (4 species, 2 varieties)
D. ser. Capitellatae (2 species, 2 subspecies)
D. ser. Ilicinae (3 species, 2 varieties)
D. ser. Dryandra (3 species, 2 subspecies)
D. ser. Foliosae (3 species, 2 subspecies)
D. ser. Decurrentes (1 species)
D. ser. Tenuifoliae (2 species, 2 varieties)
D. ser. Runcinatae (4 species, 7 subspecies)
D. ser. Triangulares (3 species, 3 subspecies)
D. ser. Aphragma (9 species, 3 subspecies)
D. ser. Ionthocarpae (1 species, 2 subspecies)
D. ser. Inusitatae (1 species)
D. ser. Subulatae (1 species)
D. ser. Gymnocephalae (11 species, 4 subspecies, 2 varieties)
D. ser. Concinnae (3 species)
D. ser. Obvallatae (7 species, 2 varieties)
D. ser. Pectinatae (1 species)
D. ser. Acuminatae (1 species)
D. ser. Niveae (7 species, 7 subspecies)

D. subg. Hemiclidia (2 species)
D. subg. Diplophragma (1 species)

== Recent developments ==
Since 1998, Austin Mast has been publishing results of ongoing cladistic analyses of DNA sequence data for the subtribe Banksiinae. His analyses have provided compelling evidence of the paraphyly of Banksia with respect to Dryandra; that is, it seems that Dryandra arose from within the ranks of Banksia. Early in 2007, Mast and Kevin Thiele initiated a rearrangement of Banksia by sinking Dryandra into it as B. ser. Dryandra. This transfer necessitated the setting aside of George's infrageneric arrangement of Dryandra; thus D. ser. Armatae is no longer current. Mast and Thiele have foreshadowed publishing a full arrangement once DNA sampling of Dryandra is complete.
