= Banksia subpinnatifida var. subpinnatifida =

Scientific classification
- Kingdom: Plantae
- Clade: Tracheophytes
- Clade: Angiosperms
- Clade: Eudicots
- Order: Proteales
- Family: Proteaceae
- Genus: Banksia
- Species: B. subpinnatifida (C.A.Gardner) A.R.Mast & K.R.Thiele
- Variety: B. s. var. subpinnatifida

Trinomial name
- Banksia subpinnatifida var. subpinnatifida

Synonyms
- Dryandra subpinnatifida C.A.Gardner var. subpinnatifida

Variety of shrub

Banksia subpinnatifida var. subpinnatifida is a variety of Banksia subpinnatifida. As an autonym, it is defined as encompassing the type material of the species. It was known as Dryandra subpinnatifida var. subpinnatifida until 2007, when Austin Mast and Kevin Thiele sunk all Dryandra into Banksia. As with other members of Banksia ser. Dryandra, it is endemic to the South West Botanical Province of Western Australia.
