= Banksia ionthocarpa subsp. ionthocarpa =

Scientific classification
- Kingdom: Plantae
- Clade: Tracheophytes
- Clade: Angiosperms
- Clade: Eudicots
- Order: Proteales
- Family: Proteaceae
- Genus: Banksia
- Species: B. ionthocarpa (A.S.George) A.R.Mast & K.R.Thiele
- Subspecies: B. i. subsp. ionthocarpa

Trinomial name
- Banksia ionthocarpa subsp. ionthocarpa

Synonyms
- Dryandra ionthocarpa A.S.George subsp. ionthocarpa

Subspecies of shrub

Banksia ionthocarpa subsp. ionthocarpa is a subspecies of Banksia ionthocarpa. As an autonym, it is defined as encompassing the type material of the species. It was known as Dryandra ionthocarpa subsp. ionthocarpa until 2007, when Austin Mast and Kevin Thiele sunk all Dryandra into Banksia. As with other members of Banksia ser. Dryandra, it is endemic to the South West Botanical Province of Western Australia.
