= Banksia fuscobractea =

Dark-bract banksia

Conservation status
- Critically endangered (EPBC Act)

Scientific classification
- Kingdom: Plantae
- Clade: Tracheophytes
- Clade: Angiosperms
- Clade: Eudicots
- Order: Proteales
- Family: Proteaceae
- Genus: Banksia
- Subgenus: Banksia subg. Banksia
- Series: Banksia ser. Dryandra
- Species: B. fuscobractea

Binomial name
- Banksia fuscobractea (A.S.George) A.R.Mast & K.R.Thiele

Synonyms
- Dryandra fuscobractea A.S.George

Species of shrub endemic to Western Australia

Banksia fuscobractea, commonly known as the dark-bract banksia, is a species of shrub that is endemic to a small area in the south-west of Western Australia. It has prickly, serrated, wedge-shaped leaves, pale yellow and cream-coloured flowers in heads of up to almost two hundred, and three or four egg-shaped follicles in each head.

== Description ==
Banksia fuscobractea is an erect shrub that typically grows to a height of 1 m (3 ft 3 in) and has stems covered in thick, matted hairs, but does not form a lignotuber. Its leaves are wedge-shaped in outline, 40–70 mm (1.6–2.8 in) long and 10–30 mm (0.39–1.18 in) wide on a petiole 5–10 mm (0.20–0.39 in) long, with between four and nine sharply-pointed serrations on each side. The flowers are borne on a head containing between 180 and 190 flowers. There are linear involucral bracts 8–11 mm (0.31–0.43 in) long at the base of the head. The flowers have a pale yellow perianth 20–23 mm (0.79–0.91 in) long and a cream-coloured pistil 22–26 mm (0.87–1.02 in) long. Flowering occurs from July to October and the fruit is an egg-shaped, loosely-hairy follicle 9–12 mm (0.35–0.47 in) long. Each head has only three or four follicles.

== Taxonomy and naming ==
This banksia was first formally described in 1996 by Alex George in the journal Nuytsia and given the name Dryandra fuscobractea from specimens collected in 1986 by Margaret Pieroni near Gillingarra. In 2007, Austin Mast and Kevin Thiele transferred all the dryandras to the genus Banksia and this species became Banksia fuscobractea. The specific epithet (fuscobractea) is derived from Latin words meaning "dark" and "a bract", referring to the dark coloured involucral bracts.

== Distribution and habitat ==
The dark-bract banksia grows in low kwongan near Gillingarra. In 2008, the population was estimated to have only about 55 mature plants.

== Conservation status ==
Banksia fuscobractea is classified as "critically endangered" under the Australian Government Environment Protection and Biodiversity Conservation Act 1999 and as "Threatened Flora (Declared Rare Flora — Extant)" by the Department of Environment and Conservation (Western Australia) and an Interim Recovery Plan has been prepared. The main threats to the species include road, firebreak and fence maintenance, gravel extraction, weed invasion and farming activities.
