= Banksia ionthocarpa =

Scientific classification
- Kingdom: Plantae
- Clade: Tracheophytes
- Clade: Angiosperms
- Clade: Eudicots
- Order: Proteales
- Family: Proteaceae
- Genus: Banksia
- Subgenus: Banksia subg. Banksia
- Series: Banksia ser. Dryandra
- Species: B. ionthocarpa

Binomial name
- Banksia ionthocarpa (A.S.George) A.R.Mast & K.R.Thiele

Synonyms
- Dryandra ionthocarpa A.S.George

Species of shrub endemic to Western Australia

Banksia ionthocarpa is a species of shrub that is endemic to Western Australia. It has short, hairy, prostrate stems, pinnatifid leaves, pinkish purple to orange flower in heads of between forty and sixty at the base of leaves, and egg-shaped follicles with a distinctive tuft of hairs on the end.

== Description ==
Banksis ionthocarpa is a shrub that has short, hairy, prostrate, more or less underground stems and typically grows to a height of 60 cm (24 in). The leaves are pinnatifid, 80–250 mm (3.1–9.8 in) long and 5–20 mm (0.20–0.79 in) wide on a petiole 40–60 mm (1.6–2.4 in) long. There are between fifteen and thirty-five triangular lobes on each side of the leaves. The flowers are arranged in a head, surrounded by leaves, at the end of the stem. The involucral bracts are linear to lance-shaped, up to 20 mm (0.79 in) long at the base of the head. The flowers have a pinkish mauve and yellow perianth 39–43 mm (1.5–1.7 in) long and a strongly curved, cream-coloured pistil mostly 43–44 mm (1.7–1.7 in) long. Flowering occurs from September to April and the follicles are egg-shaped, 5–5 mm (0.20–0.20 in) long with a distinctive tuft of rust-coloured hairs on the end.

== Taxonomy ==
This species was discovered in 1987 by professional seed supplier Peter Luscombe. The following year specimens were collected by both Margaret Pieroni and Alex George. For the next eight years, the species was referred to by the manuscript name Dryandra sp. Kamballup (M.Pieroni 20/9/1988). In 1996, Alex George formally published the species as Dryandra ionthocarpa, the specific epithet coming from the Greek ionthas ("shaggy") and carpos ("fruit"), in reference to the tuft of hair on each follicle. George considered the fruit to be so distinctive that he placed it alone in a new series that he named Dryandra ser. Ionthocarpae.

Since 1998, Austin Mast had been publishing results of ongoing cladistic analyses of DNA sequence data for the subtribe Banksiinae. His analyses have provided evidence of the paraphyly of Banksia with respect to Dryandra, suggesting that Dryandra arose from within the ranks of Banksia. Early in 2007, Mast and Kevin Thiele initiated a rearrangement of Banksia by sinking Dryandra into it as B. ser. Dryandra; Dryandra ionthocarpa thus became Banksia ionthocarpa. This transfer necessitated the setting aside of George's infrageneric arrangement of Dryandra; thus D. ser. Ionthocarpae is no longer current.

In 2005, George described the subspecies D. ionthocarpa subsp. ionthocarpa and chrysophoenix in the journal Nuytsia.

In 2007, Austin Mast and Kevin Thiele transferred all the dryandras to the genus Banksia and this species became Banksia ionthocarpa.

In the same year, Mast and Thiele transferred the two subspecies to Banksia and the changes have been accepted by the Australian Plant Census:

- B. ionthocarpa subsp. chrysophoenix has a lignotuber, almost straight leaf lobes and larger flower parts than the autonym;
- B. ionthocarpa subsp. ionthocarpa lacks a lignotuber, has gently curved leaf lobes and smaller flower parts that subsp. chrysophoenix.

== Distribution and habitat ==
Subspecies chrysophoenix grows in kwongan and is only known from near Kamballup, north-east of the Porongurup National Park. Subspecies ionthocarpa usually also grows in kwongan and is known from three populations near Brookton.

== Conservation status ==
Both subspecies of B. ionthocarpa have been classified as "Threatened Flora (Declared Rare Flora — Extant)" by the Department of Environment and Conservation (Western Australia).
