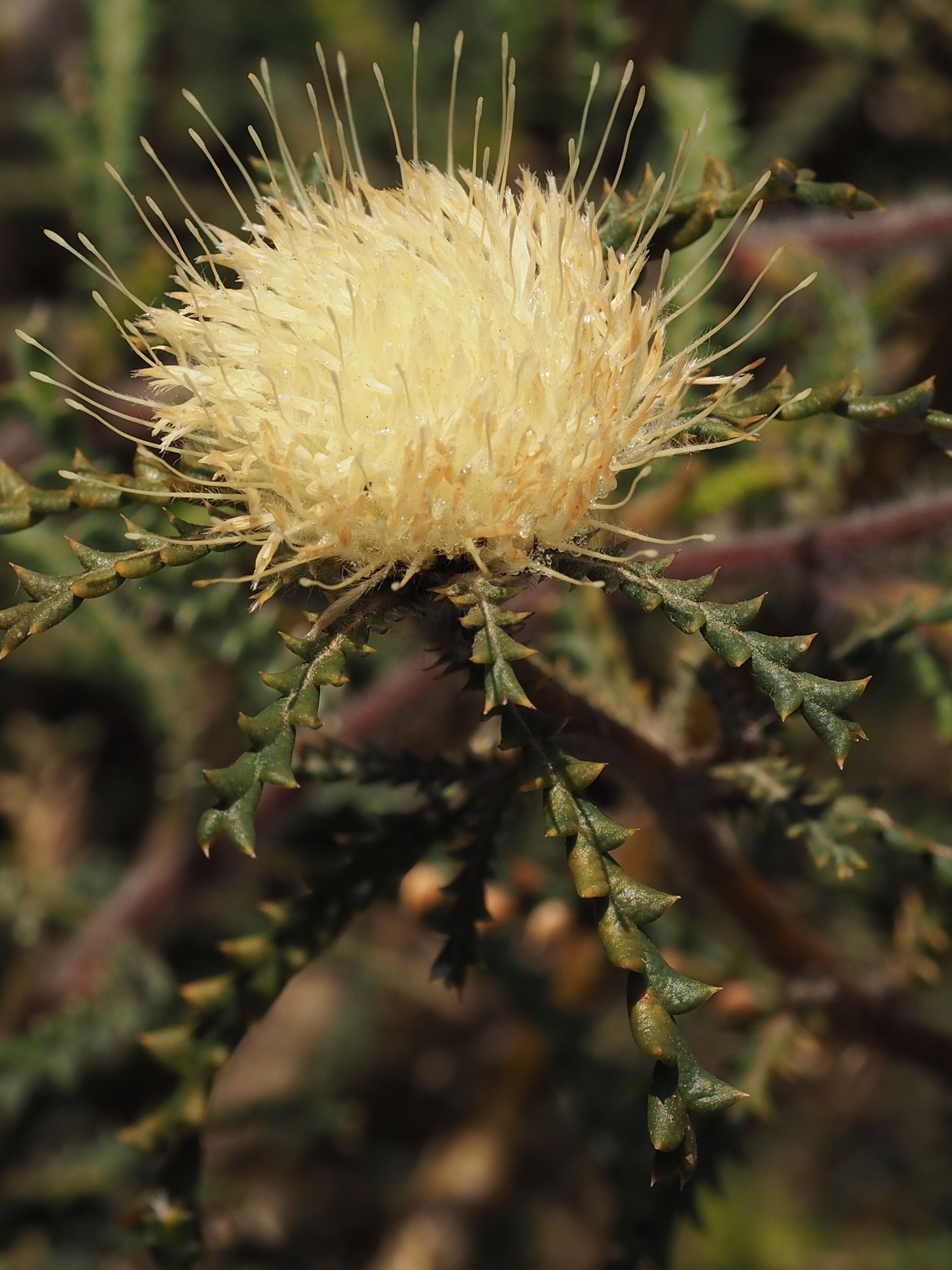

Scientific classification
- Kingdom: Plantae
- Clade: Tracheophytes
- Clade: Angiosperms
- Clade: Eudicots
- Order: Proteales
- Family: Proteaceae
- Genus: Banksia
- Subgenus: Banksia subg. Banksia
- Series: Banksia ser. Dryandra
- Species: B. echinata

Binomial name
- Banksia echinata (A.S.George) A.R.Mast & K.R.Thiele

Synonyms
- Dryandra echinata A.S.George

= Banksia echinata =

Species of shrub endemic to Western Australia

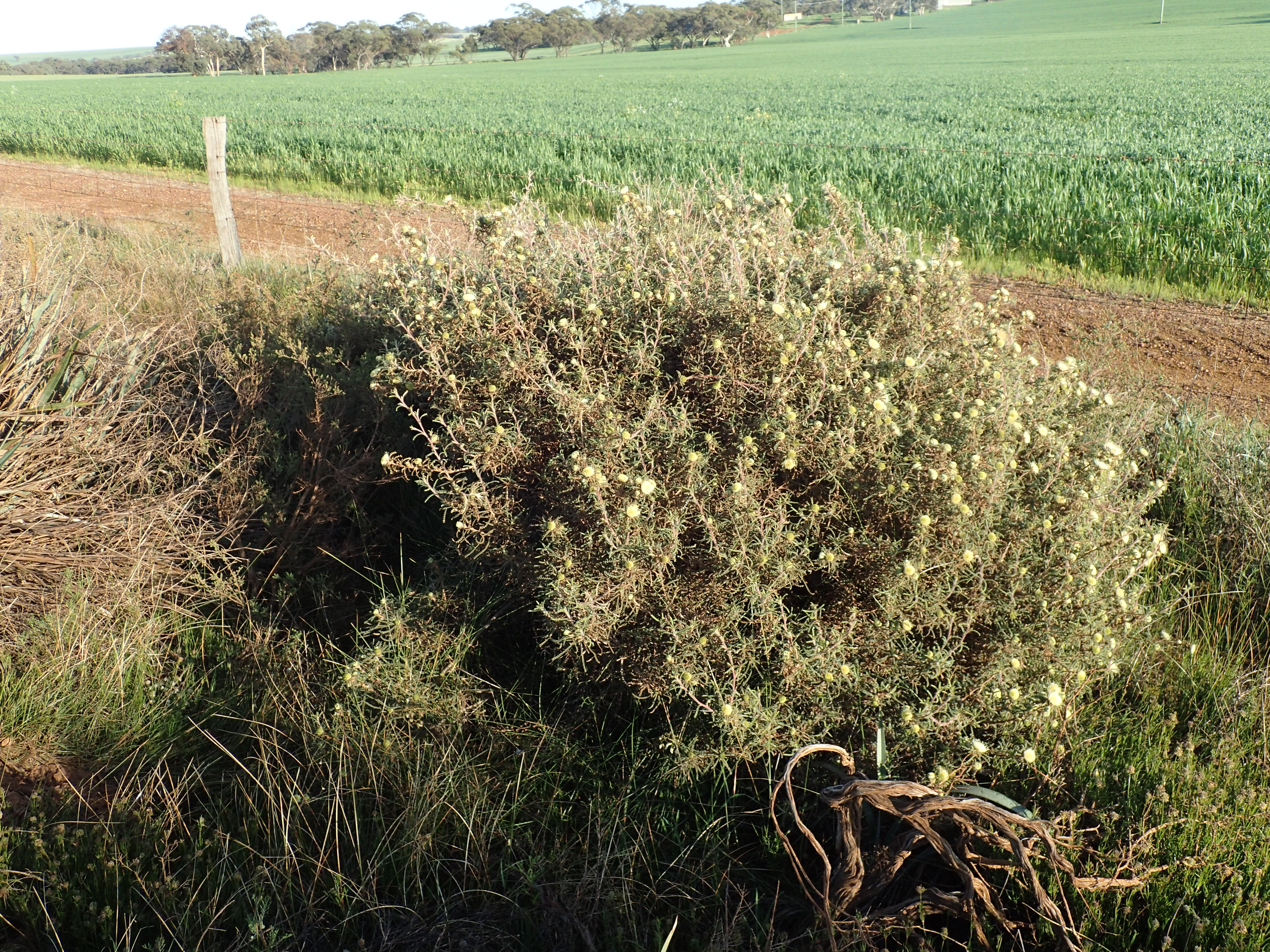
Habit on a road verge

Banksia echinata is a species of shrub that is endemic to Western Australia. It has serrated leaves with nine to twenty-five sharply pointed, triangular teeth on each side, heads of about fifty pale yellow flowers and sparsely hairy follicles.

== Description ==
Banksia echinata is a shrub that typically grows to a height of 0.6–3 m (2 ft 0 in – 9 ft 10 in) but does not form a lignotuber. It has serrated linear leaves that are 30–150 mm (1.2–5.9 in) long and 6–15 mm (0.24–0.59 in) wide with between nine and twenty-five sharply pointed, triangular teeth on each side. The flowers are borne on a head of between 45 and 55 flowers with narrow lance-shaped involucral bracts up to 10 mm (0.39 in) long at the base of the head. The flowers are pale yellow and have a perianth 17–23 mm (0.67–0.91 in) long and a pistil 22–26 mm (0.87–1.02 in) long. Flowering occurs from July to October and the fruit is a sparsely hairy follicle 6–9 mm (0.24–0.35 in) long.

== Taxonomy and naming ==
This banksia was first formally described in 1996 by Alex George in the journal Nuytsia and given the name Dryandra echinata from specimens he collected near the Brand Highway and Moore River National Park in 1986. In 2007, Austin Mast and Kevin Thiele transferred all the dryandras to the genus Banksia and this species became Banksia echinata. The specific epithet (echinata) is a Latin word meaning "armed with many prickles", referring to the teeth on the leaves.

== Distribution and habitat ==
Banksia echinata grows in kwongan and open woodland between Regans Ford, New Norcia and Gingin in the Avon Wheatbelt, Geraldton Sandplains, Jarrah Forest and Swan Coastal Plain biogeographic regions.

== Conservation status ==
This banksia is classified as "not threatened" by the Government of Western Australia Department of Parks and Wildlife.
