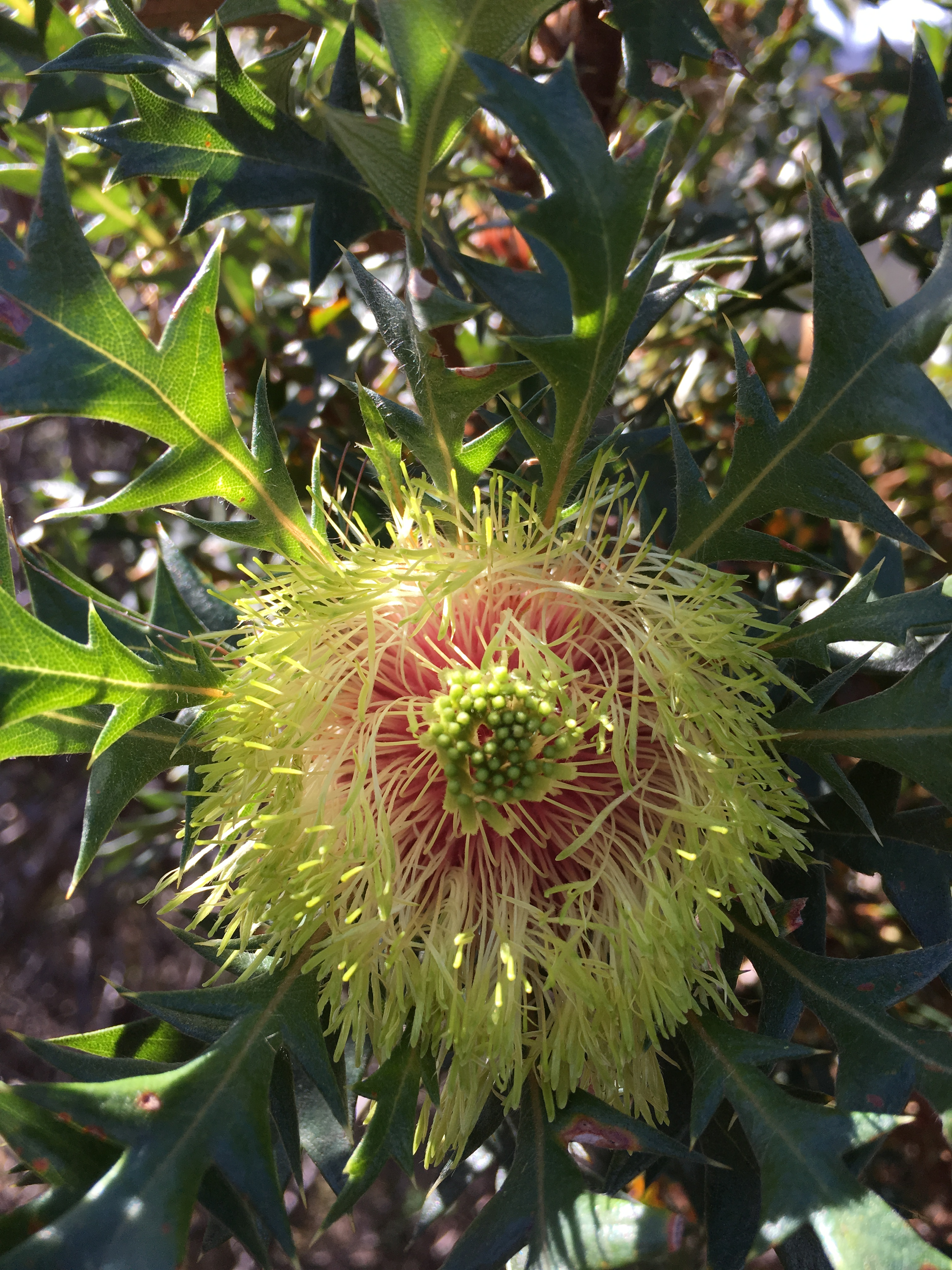

Scientific classification
- Kingdom: Plantae
- Clade: Tracheophytes
- Clade: Angiosperms
- Clade: Eudicots
- Order: Proteales
- Family: Proteaceae
- Genus: Banksia
- Subgenus: Banksia subg. Banksia
- Series: Banksia ser. Dryandra
- Species: B. hirta

Binomial name
- Banksia hirta A.R.Mast & K.R.Thiele

Synonyms
- Dryandra hirsuta A.S.George

= Banksia hirta =

Species of shrub endemic to Western Australia

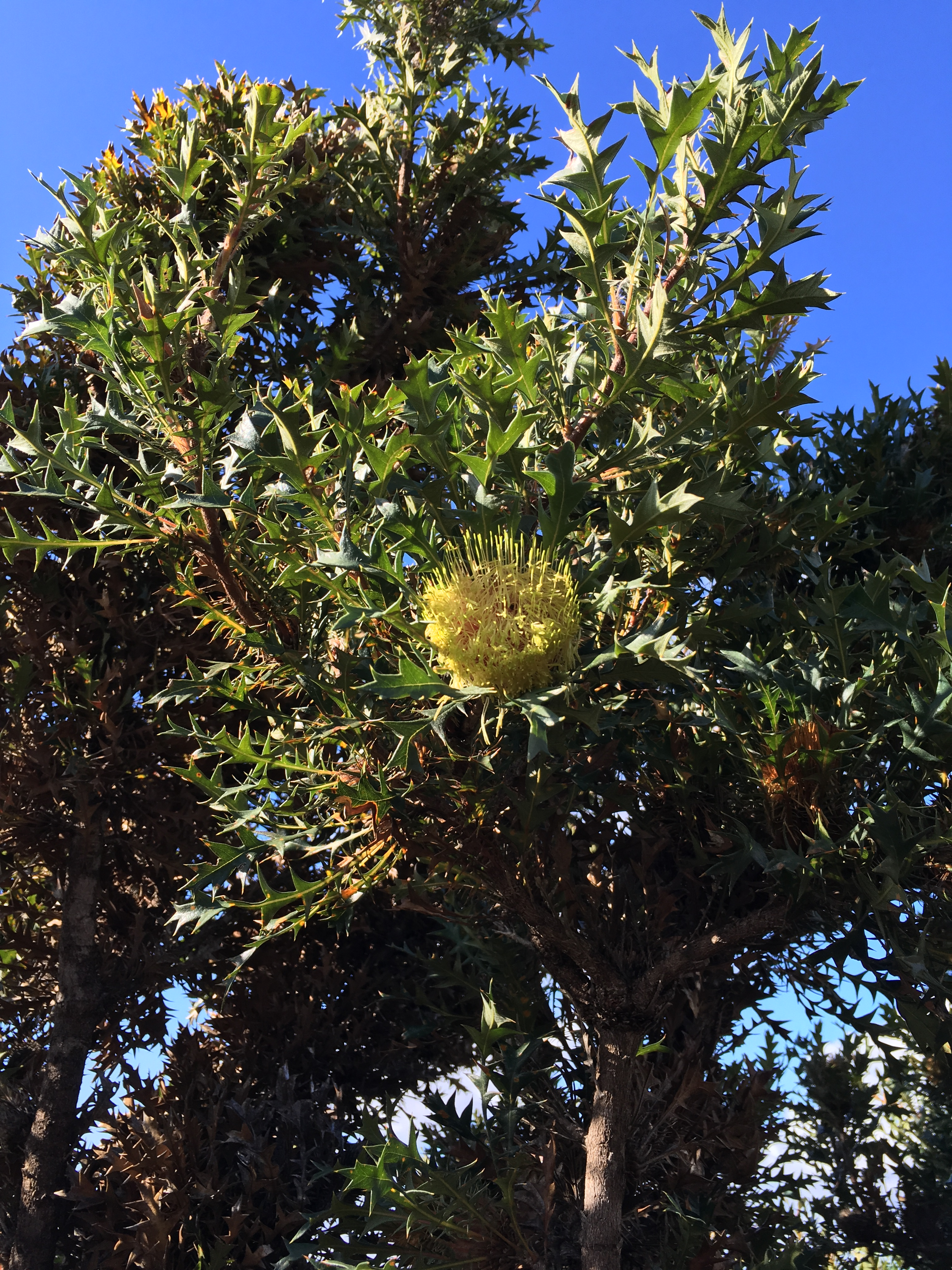
Habit in the Stirling Range National Park

Banksia hirta is a species of shrub that is endemic to Western Australia. It has hairy stems, deeply serrated leaves, pale yellow flowers in heads of about one hundred and shining follicles. It is restricted to the Stirling Range National Park.

== Description ==
Banksia hirta is a shrub that typically grows to a height of 2 m (6 ft 7 in) and has hairy stems but does not form a lignotuber. The leaves are lance-shaped to narrow egg-shaped with the narrower end towards the base, and deeply serrated, 50–130 mm (2.0–5.1 in) long and 15–35 mm (0.59–1.38 in) wide on a petiole 5–12 mm (0.20–0.47 in) long. There are between five and ten sharply-pointed, triangular lobes on each side of the leaves. The flowers are arranged in heads of between 90 and 110 with woolly-hairy, linear to lance-shaped involucral bracts 22–32 mm (0.87–1.26 in) long at the base of the head. The flowers have a pale yellow perianth 40–41 mm (1.6–1.6 in) long and a cream-coloured pistil 45–48 mm (1.8–1.9 in) long. Flowering occurs from May to October and the follicles are egg-shaped, 9–11 mm (0.35–0.43 in) long and shiny with only a few hairs.

== Taxonomy and naming ==
This banksia was first formally described in 1996 by Alex George who gave it the name Dryandra hirsuta and published the description in the journal Nuytsia from specimens collected in the Stirling Range National Park in 1986. The specific epithet (hirsuta) is a Latin word meaning "having long, rather coarse hairs" referring to the stems, young leaves and involucral bracts.

In 2007, Austin Mast and Kevin Thiele transferred all the Dryandra species to Banksia but as the name Banksia hirsuta had already been used by Otto Kuntze for a species now accepted as Pimelea latifolia subsp. hirsuta Mast and Thiele changed the epithet to hirta, a Latin word with a similar meaning to "hirsutus".

== Distribution and habitat ==
Banksia hirta grows in rocky shrubland and woodland in the central and western parts of the Stirling Range.

== Conservation status ==
This banksia is classified as "Priority Three" by the Government of Western Australia Department of Parks and Wildlife meaning that it is poorly known and known from only a few locations but is not under imminent threat.
