= Phrase name =

Informal plant taxon name

In Australian botany, a phrase name is an informal name given to a plant taxon that has not yet been given a formal scientific name. The term was adopted in 1992 by the Australian Herbarium Information Systems Committee. The species phrase name consists of four components — the generic name, "sp." (to indicate it is a species), an identifier (geographical or morphological) and a collector's name and number representing a herbarium specimen vouchering the concept of the new species.

For example, the phrase name "Derris sp. Wenlock River (B.Hyland 21082V)" refers to an unnamed species of Derris, the specimen of which was collected by Bernard Hyland on the Wenlock River and whose herbarium number is 21082V. Likewise the phrase name "Dryandra sp. 1 (A.S.George 16647)" refers to an unnamed Dryandra species to which belongs the herbarium specimen numbered 16647 collected by Alex George.

The second example is not typical — the identifier is usually something more informative, such as a location or distinctive morphological characteristic.

A phrase name is used for an unnamed taxon, which may or may not have already been formally described, but only for as long as no scientific name has been chosen for it; afterwards it may be listed as a synonym,
