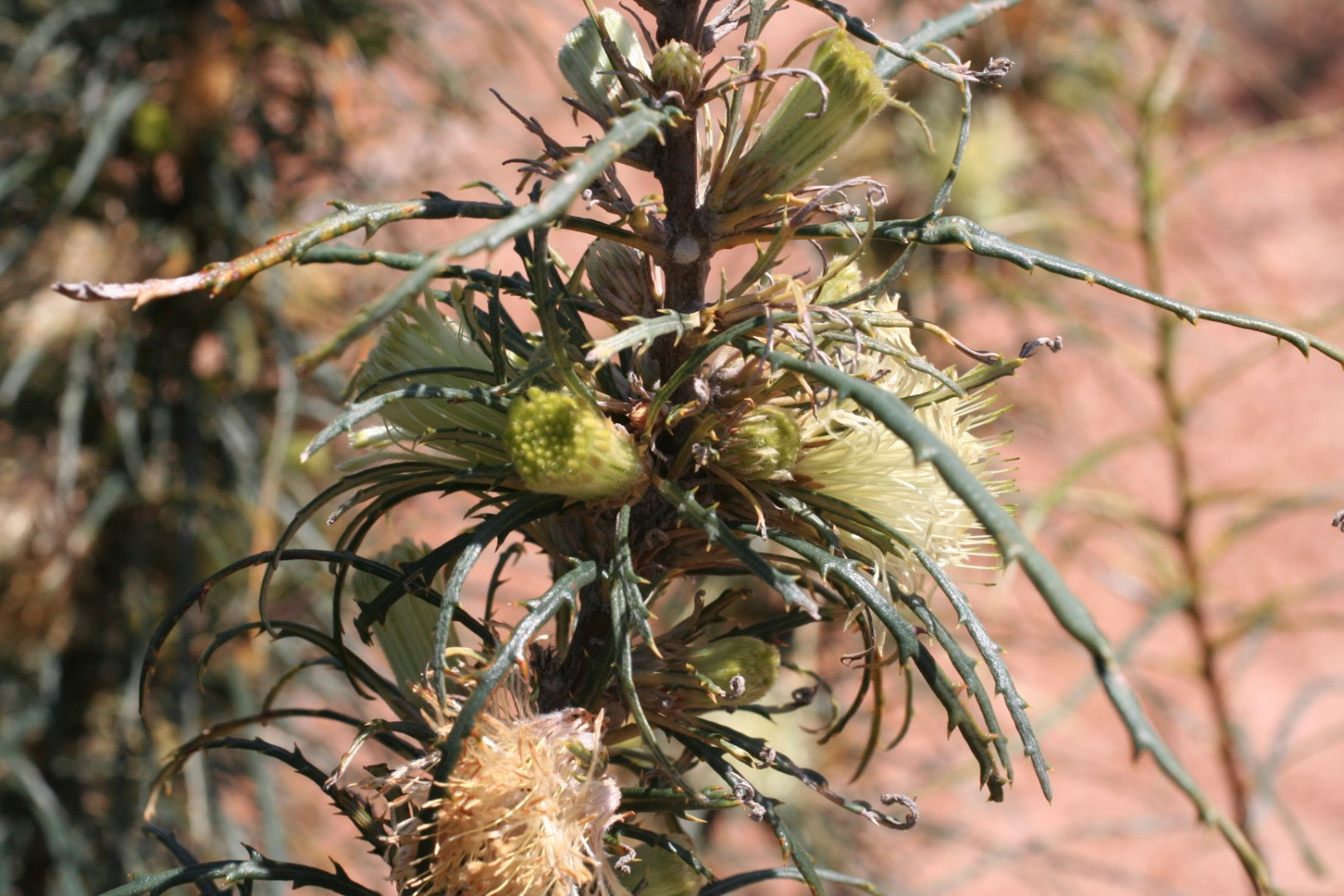
- Near Hill River

Scientific classification
- Kingdom: Plantae
- Clade: Tracheophytes
- Clade: Angiosperms
- Clade: Eudicots
- Order: Proteales
- Family: Proteaceae
- Genus: Banksia
- Subgenus: Banksia subg. Banksia
- Series: Banksia ser. Dryandra
- Species: B. strictifolia

Binomial name
- Banksia strictifolia A.R.Mast and K.R.Thiele

Synonyms
- Dryandra stricta A.S.George

= Banksia strictifolia =

Species of shrub endemic to Western Australia

Banksia strictifolia is a species of bushy shrub that is endemic to Western Australia. It has serrated, linear leaves with sharply-pointed teeth on both sides, creamy yellow flowers in heads of between forty-five and eighty-five, and egg-shaped to more or less spherical follicles.

== Description ==
Banksia strictifolia is a bushy shrub that typically grows to a height of 3 m (9.8 ft) but does not form a lignotuber. It has glabrous stems and linear leaves 50–200 mm (2.0–7.9 in) long and 4–9 mm (0.16–0.35 in) wide on a petiole up to 5 mm (0.20 in) long. There are between eight and eighteen sharply-pointed, triangular teeth on each side of the leaves. The flowers are borne in heads of between 45 and 85 with lance-shaped to narrow triangular, hairy involucral bracts up to 13 mm (0.51 in) long at the base of the head. The flowers are creamy yellow and have a perianth 23–35 mm (0.91–1.38 in) long and a straight pistil 23–25 mm (0.91–0.98 in) long. Flowering occurs from August to October and the fruit is a sparsely hairy, egg-shaped to more or less spherical follicle 6–8 mm (0.24–0.31 in) long.

== Taxonomy and naming ==
This banksia was first formally described in 1996 by Alex George in the journal Nuytsia and given the name Dryandra stricta from specimens he collected near the Brand Highway near Regans Ford in 1986. In 2007, Austin Mast and Kevin Thiele transferred all the dryandras to the genus Banksia but since the name Banksia stricta had already been used for a species now known as Pimelea stricta, Mast and Thiele changed the name to Banksia strictifolia. The specific epithet (strictifolia) is from the Latin strictus meaning "straight" and -folius meaning "leaved".

== Distribution and habitat ==
Banksia strictifolia grows in kwongan between Three Springs and Badgingarra.

== Conservation status ==
This banksia is listed as "not threatened" by the Western Australian Government Department of Parks and Wildlife.
