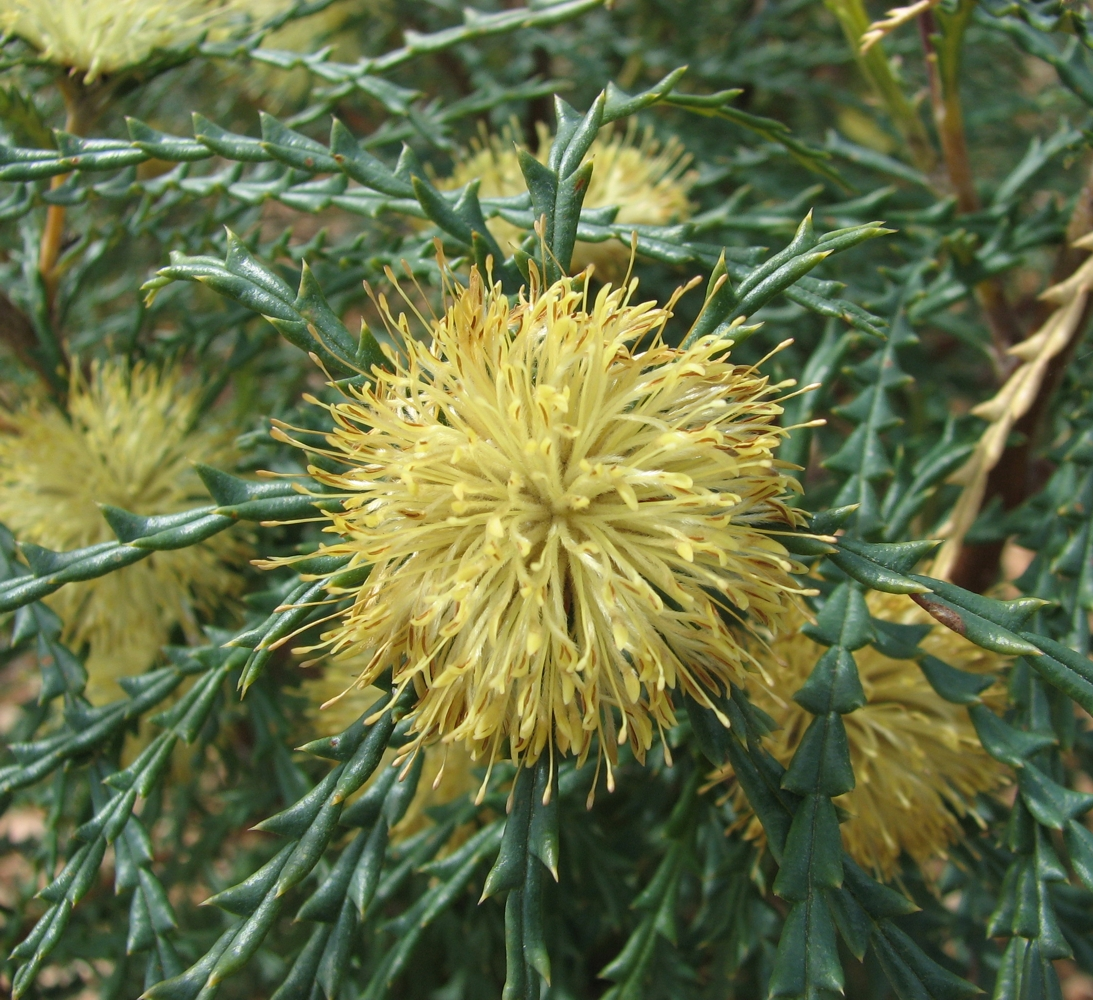
- Banksia polycephala in Cranbourne Botanic Gardens

Scientific classification
- Kingdom: Plantae
- Clade: Tracheophytes
- Clade: Angiosperms
- Clade: Eudicots
- Order: Proteales
- Family: Proteaceae
- Genus: Banksia
- Subgenus: Banksia subg. Banksia
- Series: Banksia ser. Dryandra
- Species: B. polycephala

Binomial name
- Banksia polycephala (Benth.) A.R.Mast & K.R.Thiele

Synonyms
- Dryandra polycephala Benth.; Josephia polycephala (Benth.) Kuntze

= Banksia polycephala =

Many-headed dryandra

Species of shrub endemic to Western Australia

Banksia polycephala, commonly known as many-headed dryandra, is a species of bushy shrub that is endemic to Western Australia. It has linear, pinnatisect leaves with up to twenty-five triangular lobes on each side, small, creamy yellow flowers in heads of up to seventy and egg-shaped follicles.

== Description ==
Banksia polycephala is a bushy shrub that typically grows to a height of 4 m (13 ft) but does not form a lignotuber. The leaves are pinnatisect, 50–200 mm (2.0–7.9 in) long and 3–6 mm (0.12–0.24 in) wide on a petiole 1–2 mm (0.039–0.079 in) long. There are between ten and twenty-five sharply-pointed, triangular lobes on each side of the leaf lamina and one or two short teeth on the petiole. Between sixty and seventy cream-coloured flowers are borne in heads with lance-shaped involucral bracts up to 7 mm (0.28 in) long at the base of each head. The perianth is 13–15 mm (0.51–0.59 in) long and the pistil 16–19 mm (0.63–0.75 in) long. Flowering occurs from August to October, and the follicles are egg-shaped and 7–9 mm (0.28–0.35 in) long. Only up to three follicles form in each head.

== Taxonomy and naming ==
This species was first formally described in 1870 by George Bentham who gave it the name Dryandra polycephala and published the description in Flora Australiensis from specimens collected by James Drummond. The specific epithet (polycephala) is derived from the ancient Greek words polys (πολύς), meaning "many" and kephalē (κεφαλή), meaning "head".

In 2007 Austin Mast and Kevin Thiele transferred all dryandras to the genus Banksia and renamed this species Banksia polycephala.

== Distribution and habitat ==
The many-headed dryandra only occurs in an area between New Norcia and Bindoon where it grows in woodland with Eucalyptus wandoo.

== Conservation status ==
This banksia is classified as "not threatened" by the Western Australian Government Department of Parks and Wildlife.
