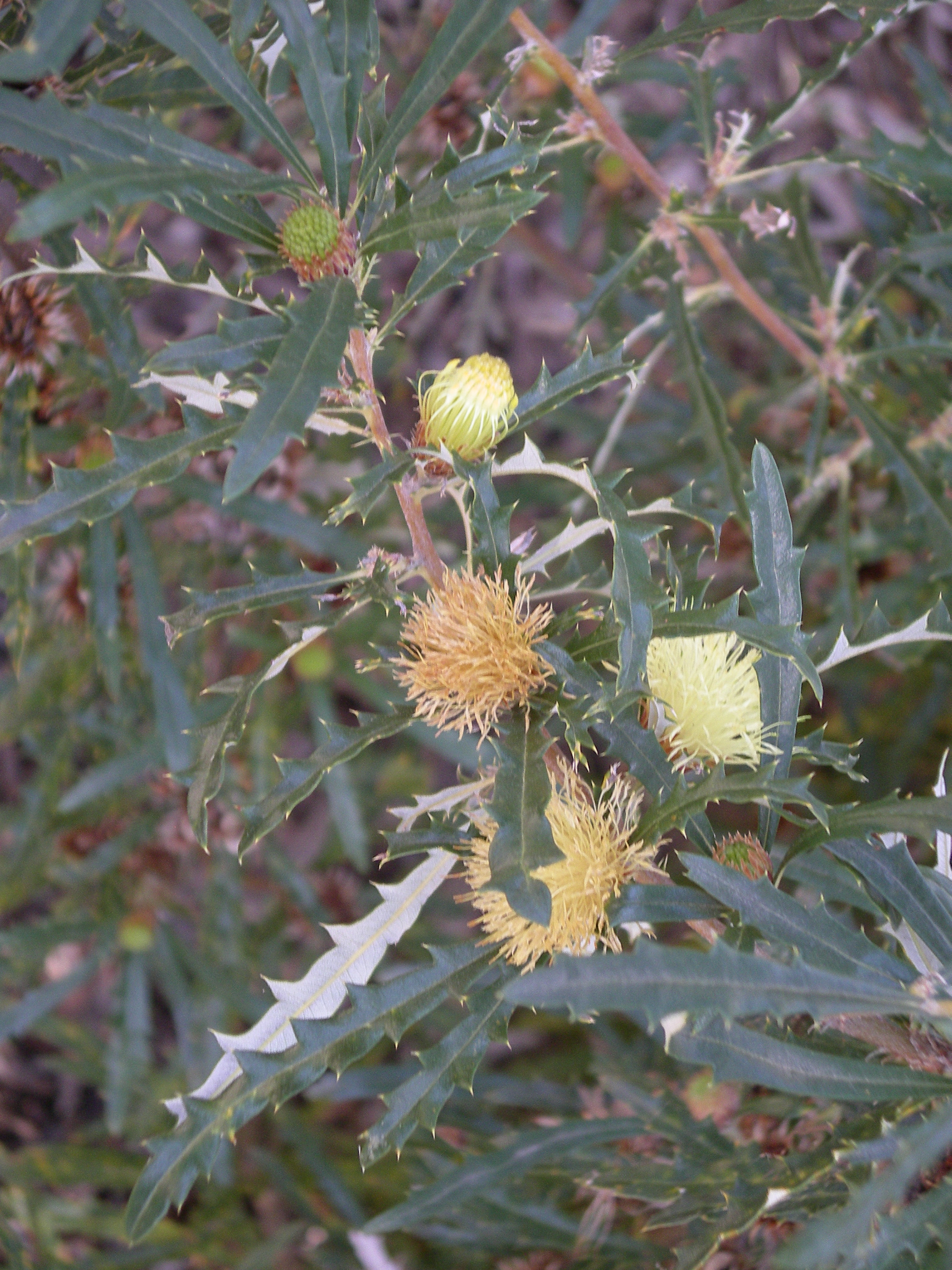

Scientific classification
- Kingdom: Plantae
- Clade: Embryophytes
- Clade: Tracheophytes
- Clade: Spermatophytes
- Clade: Angiosperms
- Clade: Eudicots
- Order: Proteales
- Family: Proteaceae
- Genus: Banksia
- Subgenus: Banksia subg. Banksia
- Series: Banksia ser. Dryandra
- Species: B. squarrosa

Binomial name
- Banksia squarrosa (R.Br.) A.R.Mast & K.R.Thiele

Synonyms
- Dryandra squarrosa R.Br.; Josephia squarrosa (R.Br.) Kuntze

= Banksia squarrosa =

Pingle

Species of shrub native to Western Australia

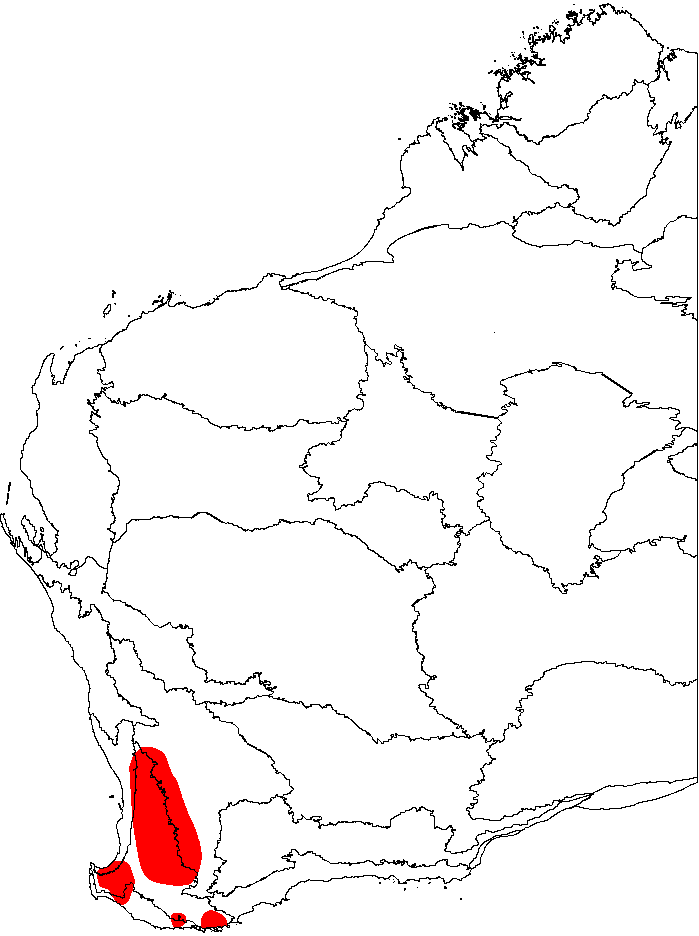
Distribution of B. squarrosa

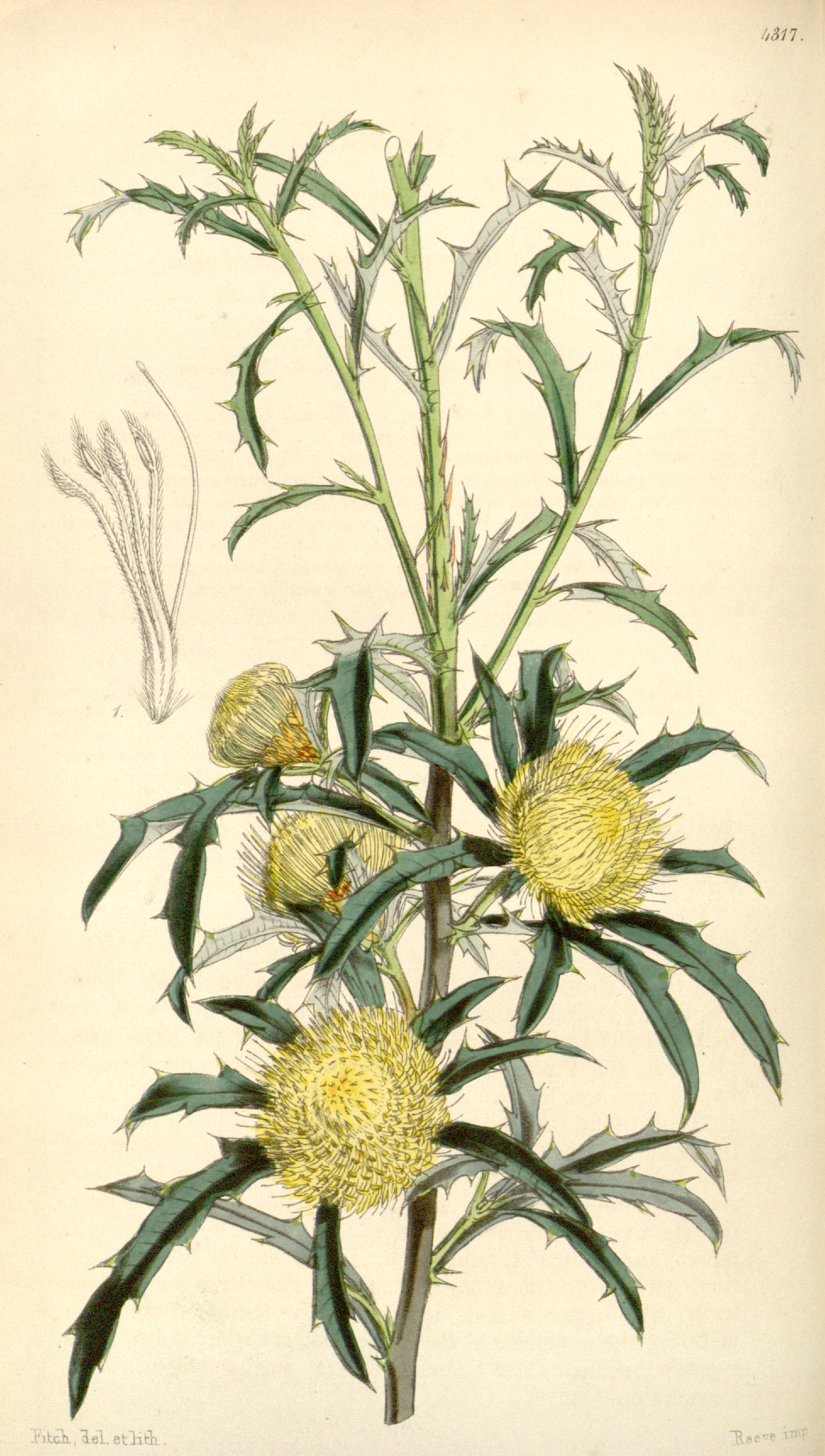
Illustration from Curtis's Botanical Magazine

Banksia squarrosa, commonly known as pingle, is a species of prickly shrub that is endemic to Western Australia. It has linear to narrow lance-shaped leaves with up to ten sharply-pointed teeth on each side, yellow flowers in heads of about sixty and later, up to seven oblong to egg-shaped follicles in each head.

== Description ==
Banksia squarrosa is a shrub that typically grows to a height of 4 m (13 ft) but does not form a lignotuber. It has sessile linear to narrow lance-shaped leaves that are 30–90 mm (1.2–3.5 in) long and 5–12 mm (0.20–0.47 in) wide with up to ten sharply-pointed, triangular teeth on each side. The flowers are yellow and are arranged in heads of between fifty and seventy with narrow triangular to linear involucral bracts 10–13 mm (0.39–0.51 in) long at the base of each head. The perianth is 18–24 mm (0.71–0.94 in) long and the pistil 20–26 mm (0.79–1.02 in) long and straight. Flowering occurs from June to November and the follicles are oblong to egg-shaped, 8–13 mm (0.31–0.51 in) long and more or less glabrous. Up to seven follicles form in each head.

== Taxonomy and naming ==
This species was first collected from near King George Sound in 1829 by William Baxter, and its description was published by Robert Brown in Supplementum primum Prodromi florae Novae Hollandiae as Dryandra squarrosa the following year.

In 1839 John Lindley described D. carduacea from specimens collected in the vicinity of the Swan River. In 1996, Alex George reduced D. carduacea to a synonym of D. squarrosa.

In 1996, George described two subspecies of D. squarrosa:

- Dryandra squarrosa subsp. argillacea that has a perianth 18–19 mm (0.71–0.75 in) long with a glabrous limb;
- Dryandra squarrosa subsp. squarrosa that has a perianth 19–24 mm (0.75–0.94 in) long with a hairy limb.

In 2007 Austin Mast and Kevin Thiele transferred all dryandras to the genus Banksia and renamed this species Banksia squarrosa and the two subspecies argillacea and squarrosa respectively. The names of the subspecies are accepted by the Australian Plant Census.

== Distribution and habitat ==
Pingle is widely distributed in the south-west of Western Australia, occurring between Bindoon, the Whicher Range and Albany, growing in woodland and forest. Subspecies argillacea has a limited distribution near the western side of the Whicher Range. Subspecies squarrosa occurs throughout the species' range, except near the Whicher Range.

== Conservation status ==
This banksia is classified as "not threatened" by the Western Australian Government Department of Parks and Wildlife, but subspecies argillacea is listed as "Threatened Flora (Declared Rare Flora — Extant)" by the Department of Environment and Conservation (Western Australia)
