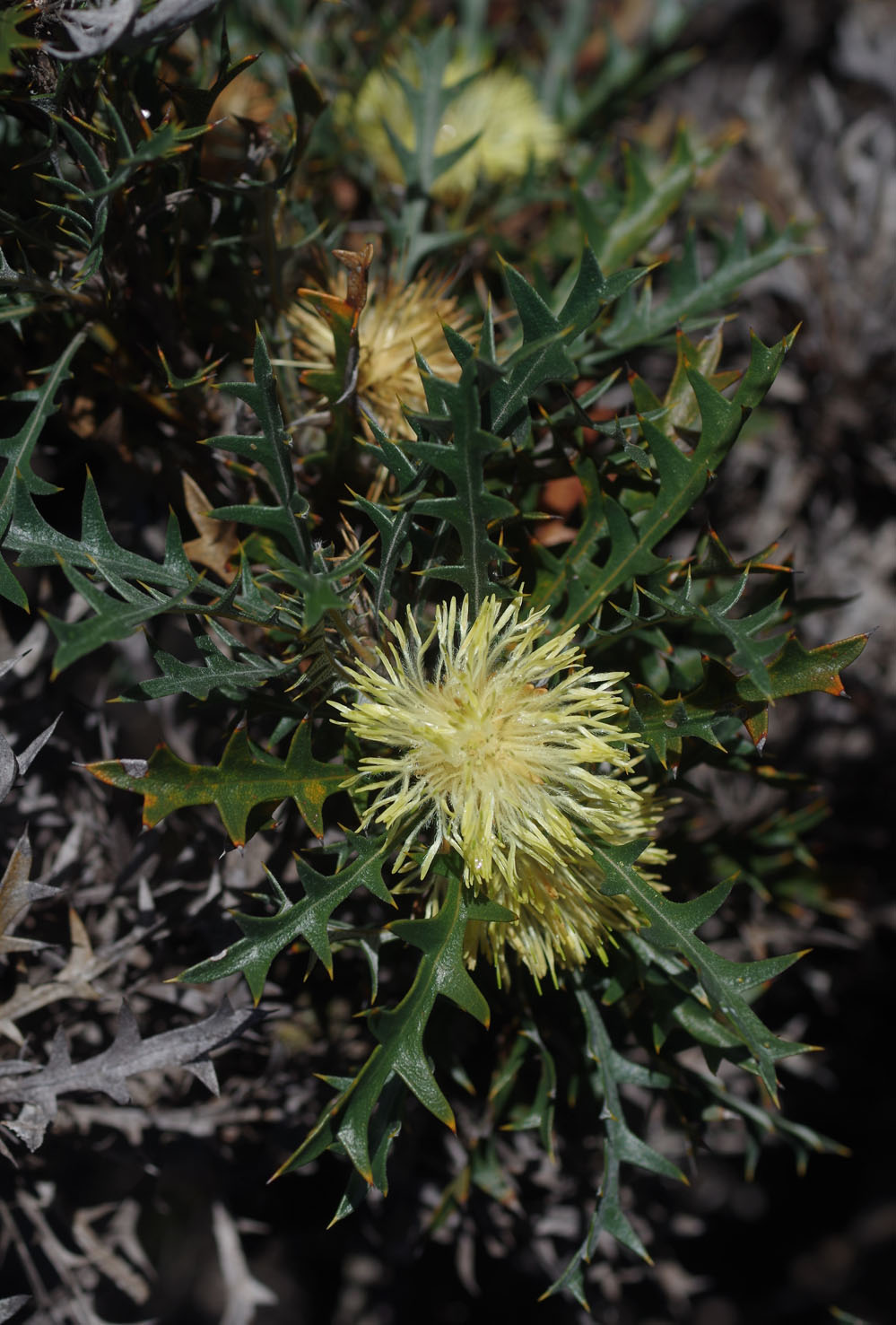

Scientific classification
- Kingdom: Plantae
- Clade: Tracheophytes
- Clade: Angiosperms
- Clade: Eudicots
- Order: Proteales
- Family: Proteaceae
- Genus: Banksia
- Subgenus: Banksia subg. Banksia
- Series: Banksia ser. Dryandra
- Species: B. purdieana

Binomial name
- Banksia purdieana (Diels) A.R.Mast & K.R.Thiele

Synonyms
- Dryandra purdieana Diels

= Banksia purdieana =

Species of shrub endemic to Western Australia

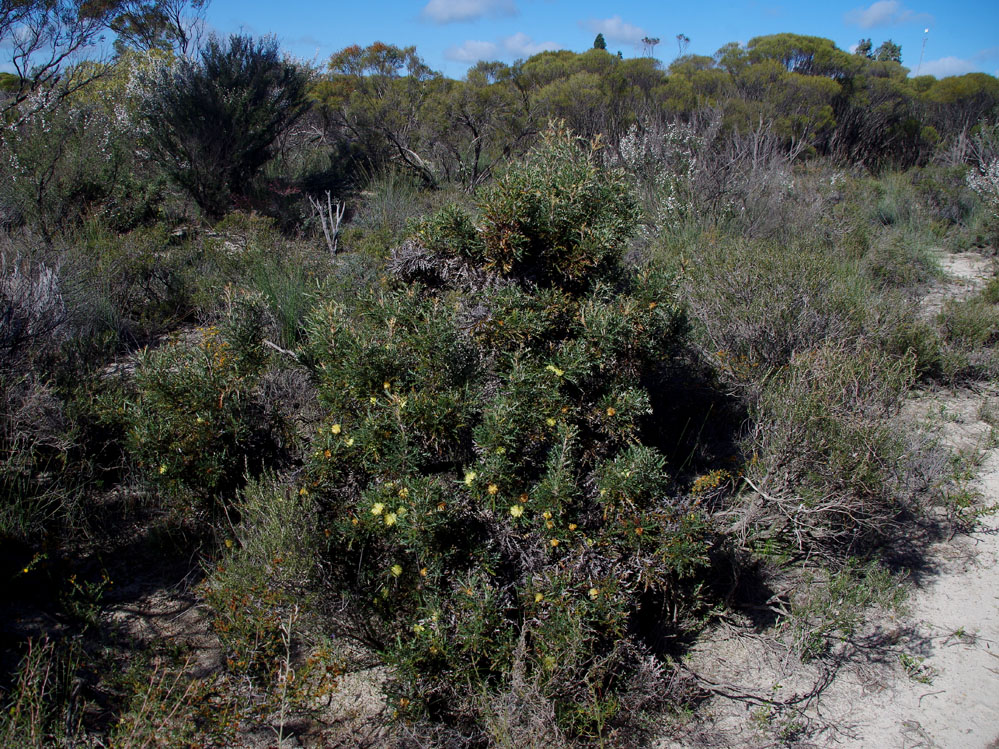
Habit in Wongan Hills

Banksia purdieana is a species of bushy shrub that is endemic to Western Australia. It has broadly linear, pinnatipartite leaves with sharply-pointed lobes on the sides, yellow flowers in heads of about eighty and egg-shaped follicles.

== Description ==
Banksia purdieana is a bushy or column-shaped shrub that grows to 0.4–2 m (1 ft 4 in – 6 ft 7 in) high and up to 3 m (9.8 ft) wide but does not form a lignotuber. It has curved, broadly linear, pinnatipartite leaves that are 50–110 mm (2.0–4.3 in) long and 25–35 mm (0.98–1.38 in) wide with between four and seven triangular, sharply-pointed teeth on each side. The flowers are yellow and are arranged heads of about eighty with elliptical to linear involucral bracts up to 16 mm (0.63 in) long at the base of the head. The perianth is 22–24 mm (0.87–0.94 in) long and the pistil 25–27 mm (0.98–1.06 in) long and curved. Flowering occurs from July to September and the follicles are egg-shaped with a notch at the base and 8–11 mm (0.31–0.43 in) long.

== Taxonomy and naming ==
This species was first formally described in 1904 by Ludwig Diels who gave it the name Dryandra purdieana and published the description in the journal Botanische Jahrbücher für Systematik, Pflanzengeschichte und Pflanzengeographie. The specific epithet (purdieana) honours Diels's friend Alexander Purdie.

In 2007 Austin Mast and Kevin Thiele transferred all dryandras to the genus Banksia and renamed this species Banksia purdieana.

== Distribution and habitat ==
This banksia grows in kwongan between Tathra National Park, Mogumber, Cadoux, Moorine Rock and Bendering in the Avon Wheatbelt, Coolgardie, Geraldton Sandplains, Jarrah Forest and Mallee biogeographic regions.

== Conservation status ==
Banksia purdieana is classed as "not threatened" by the Western Australian Government Department of Parks and Wildlife.
