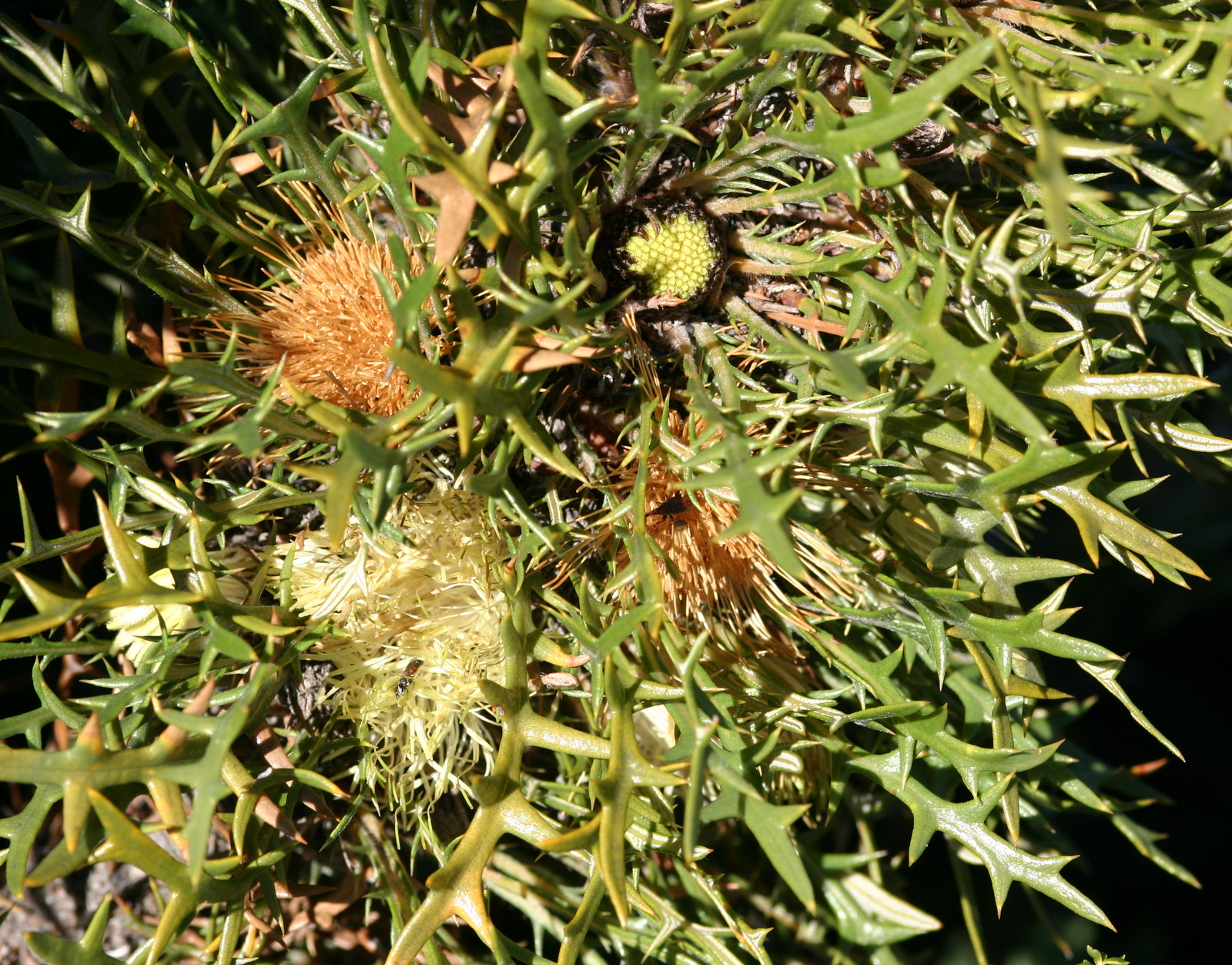
- Banksia cirsioides at Fitzgerald River National Park

Scientific classification
- Kingdom: Plantae
- Clade: Tracheophytes
- Clade: Angiosperms
- Clade: Eudicots
- Order: Proteales
- Family: Proteaceae
- Genus: Banksia
- Subgenus: Banksia subg. Banksia
- Series: Banksia ser. Dryandra
- Species: B. cirsioides

Binomial name
- Banksia cirsioides (Meisn.) A.R.Mast & K.R.Thiele

Synonyms
- Dryandra cirsioides Meisn.; Josephia cirsiodes Kuntze orth. var.; Josephia cirsioides (Meisn.) Kuntze

= Banksia cirsioides =

Species of shrub endemic to Western Australia

Banksia cirsioides is a species of shrub that is endemic to Western Australia. It has pinnatisect leaves with between six and ten lobes on each side and hairy heads of yellow and pink flowers.

== Description ==
Banksia cirsiodes is a rounded or column-like shrub that typically grows to a height of 2 m (6 ft 7 in) but does not form a lignotuber. It has hairy, pinnatisect leaves that are 60–105 mm (2.4–4.1 in) long and 20–45 mm (0.79–1.77 in) wide on a petiole 6–10 mm (0.24–0.39 in) long. Each side of the leaves has between six and ten linear to lance-shaped, sharply pointed lobes on each side. The flowers are arranged in a head of between 100 and 120, surrounded at the base by hairy, linear to lance-shaped involucral bracts up to 25 mm (0.98 in) long. The flowers are yellow with a pink base, the perianth 29–34 mm (1.1–1.3 in) long and the pistil is pale yellow and 32–42 mm (1.3–1.7 in) long. Flowering occurs from May to August and the fruit is a more or less glabrous follicle 7–11 mm (0.28–0.43 in) long.

== Taxonomy and naming ==
This species was first formally described in 1856 by Carl Meissner who gave it the name Dryandra cirsioides and published the description in de Candolle's Prodromus Systematis Naturalis Regni Vegetabilis from specimens collected by James Drummond. The specific epithet (carlinoides) is a reference to a perceived similarity to plants in the genus Cirsium. In 2007 Austin Mast and Kevin Thiele transferred all dryandras to the genus Banksia.

== Distribution and habitat ==
Banksia cirsioides grows in kwongan between the Stirling Range and Munglinup in the Avon Wheatbelt, Coolgardie, Esperance Plains and Mallee biogeographic regions
