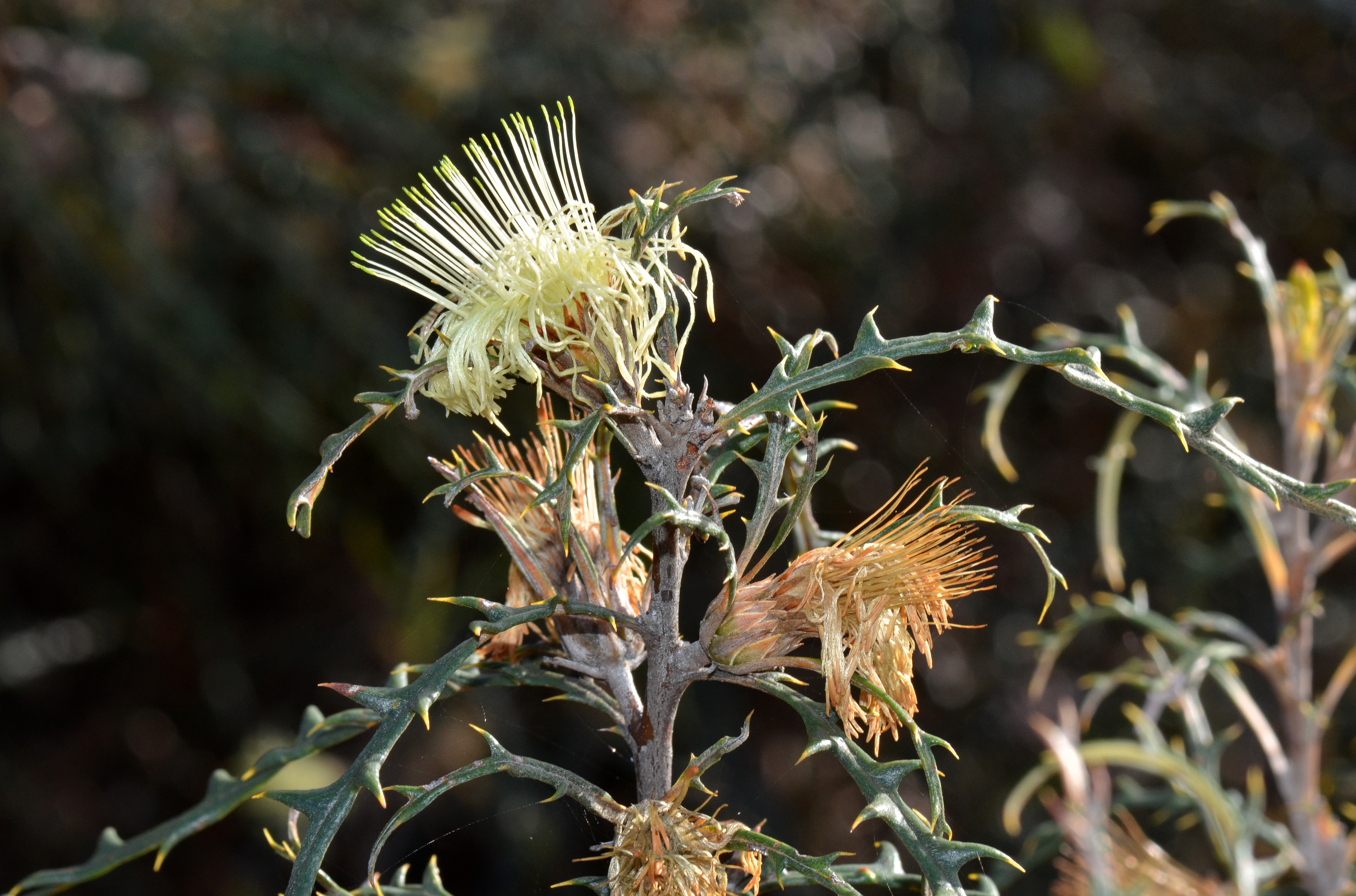

Scientific classification
- Kingdom: Plantae
- Clade: Tracheophytes
- Clade: Angiosperms
- Clade: Eudicots
- Order: Proteales
- Family: Proteaceae
- Genus: Banksia
- Subgenus: Banksia subg. Banksia
- Series: Banksia ser. Dryandra
- Species: B. hewardiana

Binomial name
- Banksia hewardiana (Meisn.) A.R.Mast & K.R.Thiele

Synonyms
- Dryandra hewardiana Meisn.; Dryandra patens Benth.; Josephia hewardiana (Meisn.) Kuntze; Josephia patens (Benth.) Kuntze

= Banksia hewardiana =

Species of shrub endemic to Western Australia

Banksia hewardiana is a species of openly branched shrub that is endemic to Western Australia. It has linear, serrated leaves with sharply pointed teeth, head of up to sixty lemon-yellow flowers and oblong follicles.

== Description ==
Banksia hewardiana is an openly branched shrub that typically grows to a height of 0.5–3 m (1 ft 8 in – 9 ft 10 in) but does not form a lignotuber. The leaves are serrated, linear in outline, 40–200 mm (1.6–7.9 in) long and 10–24 mm (0.39–0.94 in) wide on a petiole up to 5 mm (0.20 in) long. There are between five and fifteen sharply pointed teeth on each side of the leaves. Groups of between thirty-five and sixty sweetly-scented flowers are borne in a head on a side branch about 20 mm (0.79 in) long. There are hairy, lance-shaped involucral bracts up to 10 mm (0.39 in) long at the base of the head. The flowers have a lemon-yellow perianth 21–26 mm (0.83–1.02 in) long and a cream-coloured pistil 23–27 mm (0.91–1.06 in) long and glabrous. Flowering occurs from July to November and the follicles are oblong to egg-shaped, 8–10 mm (0.31–0.39 in) long and sparsely hairy.

== Taxonomy and naming ==
This species was first formally described in 1856 by Carl Meissner who gave it the name Dryandra hewardiana and published the description in de Candolle's Prodromus Systematis Naturalis Regni Vegetabilis from specimens collected by James Drummond. The specific epithet (hewardiana) honours the English botanist Robert Heward (1791–1877). In 2007 Austin Mast and Kevin Thiele transferred all dryandras to the genus Banksia and renamed this species Banksia hewardiana.

== Distribution and habitat ==
Banksia hewardiana grows in woodland and heath between Cataby, New Norcia and Moora.

== Conservation status ==
This banksia is classified as "not threatened" by the Government of Western Australia Department of Parks and Wildlife.
