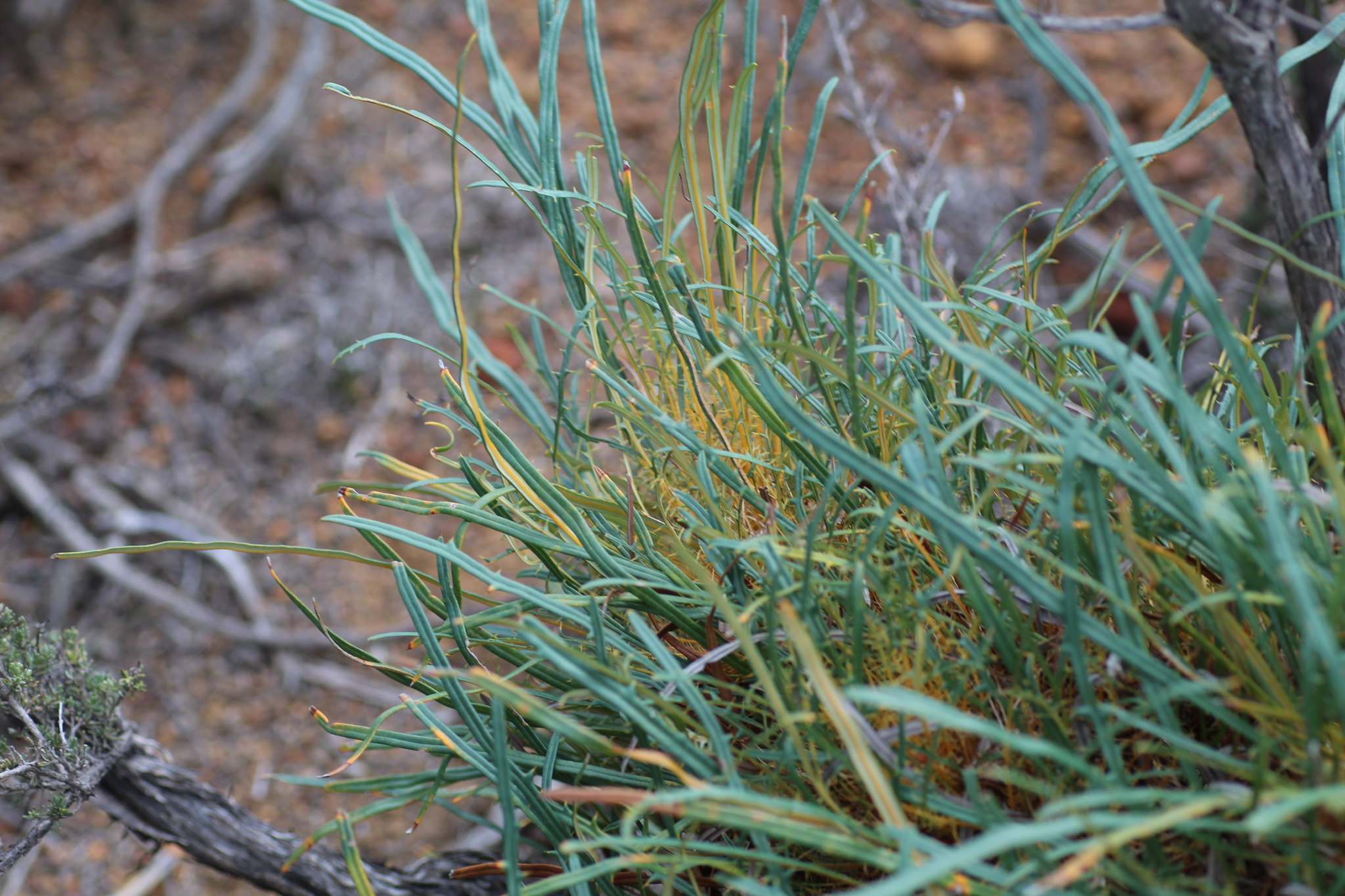

Scientific classification
- Kingdom: Plantae
- Clade: Tracheophytes
- Clade: Angiosperms
- Clade: Eudicots
- Order: Proteales
- Family: Proteaceae
- Genus: Banksia
- Subgenus: Banksia subg. Banksia
- Series: Banksia ser. Dryandra
- Species: B. subpinnatifida

Binomial name
- Banksia subpinnatifida (C.A.Gardner) A.R.Mast & K.R.Thiele

Synonyms
- Dryandra subpinnatifida C.A.Gardner

= Banksia subpinnatifida =

Species of shrub endemic to Western Australia

Banksia subpinnatifida is a species of bushy shrub that is endemic to the southwest of Western Australia. It has more or less linear, pinnatipartite leaves with sharply-pointed teeth on the sides, golden yellow flowers in heads of about sixty, and glabrous, elliptical follicles.

== Description ==
Banksia subpinnatifida is a bushy shrub that typically grows to a height of 1.6 m (5 ft 3 in) but does not form a lignotuber. It has more or less linear leaves that are 50–350 mm (2.0–13.8 in) long, 2–16 mm (0.079–0.630 in) wide on a petiole up to 20 mm (0.79 in) long. There are up to fifteen widely spaced teeth in the lower half of the leaf. The flowers are golden yellow and arranged in heads of between sixty and seventy, the heads often crowded on short side branches. There are linear to lance-shaped involucral bracts 11–20 mm (0.43–0.79 in) long at the base of the head. The perianth is woolly-hairy, 26–28 mm (1.0–1.1 in) long and the pistil 34–41 mm (1.3–1.6 in) long, gently curved and glabrous. Flowering occurs from September to October and the fruit is a glabrous, elliptical follicle 9–13 mm (0.35–0.51 in) long.

== Taxonomy ==
This species was first formally described in 1964 by Charles Austin Gardner who gave it the name Dryandra subpinnatifida and published the description in the Journal of the Royal Society of Western Australia from specimens collected by Fred Lullfitz.

In 1996, Alex George describe two varieties of Dryandra subpinnatifida in the journal Nuytsia:

- Dryandra subpinnatifida subsp. inerbis that has about sixty flowers in each head and bracts up to 20 mm (0.79 in) long;
- Dryandra subpinnatifida subsp. subpinnatifida that has between forty and fifty flowers in each head and bracts to 12 mm (0.47 in) long.

In 2007, Austin Mast and Kevin Thiele transferred all the dryandras to the genus Banksia and this species became Banksia subpinnatifida and the varieties var. inerbis and subpinnatifida respectively.

== Distribution and habitat ==
Banksia subpinnatifida is found between Pingelly and Tambellup. Variety inerbis occurs between Boddington and Broomehill, and var. subpinnatifida grows in thick scrub between Pingelly and Narrogin.

== Conservation status ==
Banksia subpinnatifida is classified as "not threatened" by the Western Australian Government Department of Parks and Wildlife but var. inerbis is listed as "Priority Three" meaning that it is poorly known and known from only a few locations but is not under imminent threat and var. subpinnatifida as "Priority Two" meaning that it is poorly known and from only one or a few locations.
