= Cluster root =

Root structures that aid phosphorus uptake

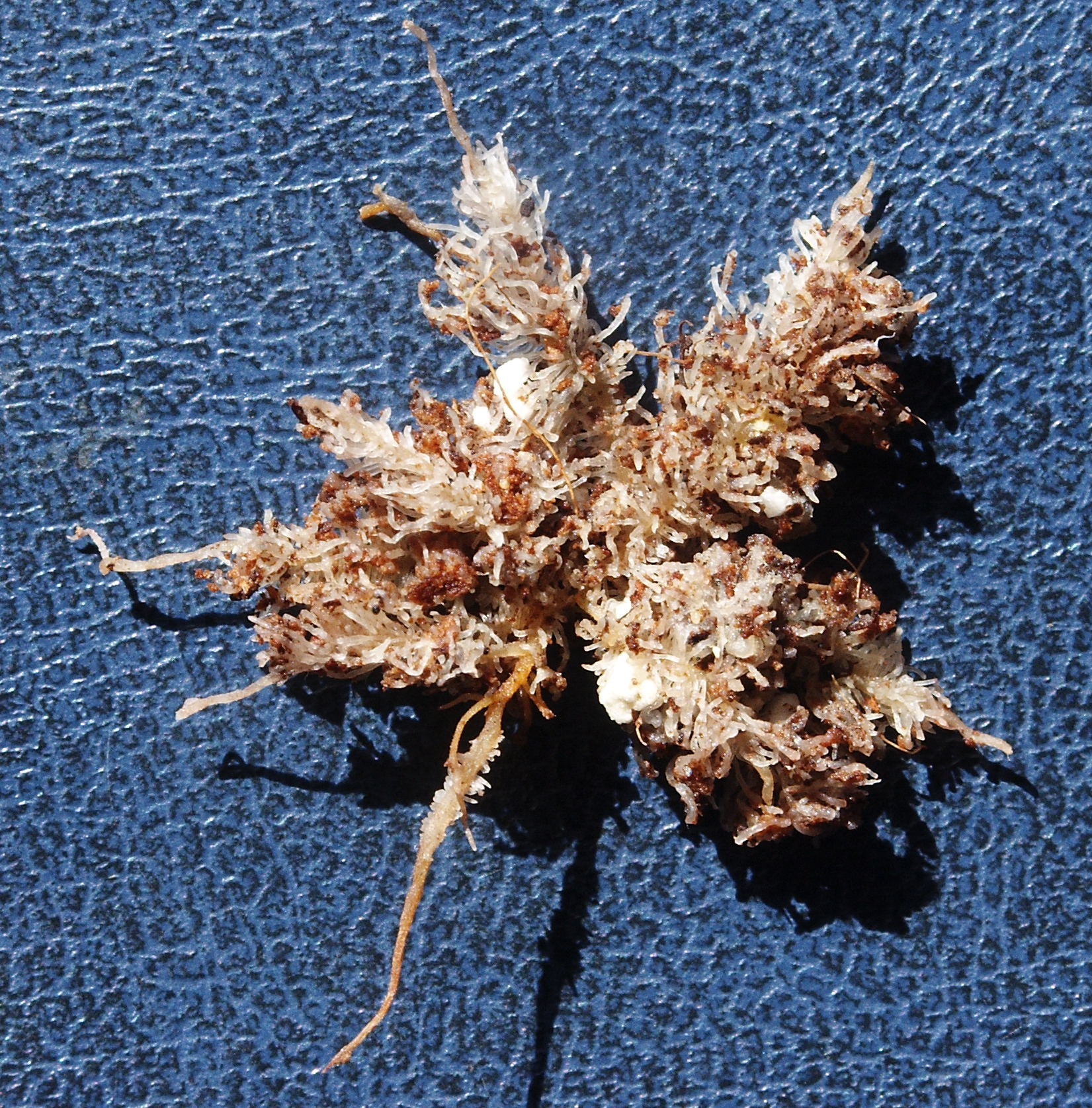
Proteoid roots of Leucospermum cordifolium

Cluster roots, also known as proteoid roots, are plant roots that form clusters of closely spaced short lateral rootlets. They may form a two- to five-centimetre-thick mat just beneath the leaf litter. They enhance nutrient uptake, possibly by chemically modifying the soil environment to improve nutrient solubilisation. As a result, plants with proteoid roots can grow in soil that is very low in nutrients, such as the phosphorus-deficient native soils of Australia.

They were first described by Adolf Engler in 1894, after he discovered them on plants of the family Proteaceae growing in Leipzig Botanic Gardens. In 1960, Helen Purnell examined 44 species from ten Proteaceae genera, finding proteoid roots in every genus except Persoonia; she then coined the name "proteoid roots" in reference to the plant family in which it was known to occur. Proteoid roots are now known to occur in 27 different Proteaceae genera, plus around 30 species from other families, including Betulaceae, Casuarinaceae, Eleagnaceae, Leguminosae, Moraceae and Myricaceae. Similar structures also occur in species of Cyperaceae and Restionaceae, but their physiology is yet to be studied.

Two forms are recognised: simple cluster roots form rootlets only along a root; compound cluster roots form the primary rootlets, and also form secondary rootlets on the primary rootlets.

Some Proteaceae, such as Banksia and Grevillea, are valued by the horticulture and floriculture industries. In cultivation, only slow-release low-phosphorus fertilizers should be used, as higher levels cause phosphorus toxicity and sometimes iron deficiency, leading to plant death. Crop management should minimise root disturbance, and weed control should be via slashing or contact herbicides.

Many plants with proteoid roots have economic value. Cultivated crops with proteoid roots include Lupinus and Macadamia.
