= Margaret Pieroni =

Western Australian botanical illustrator and artist

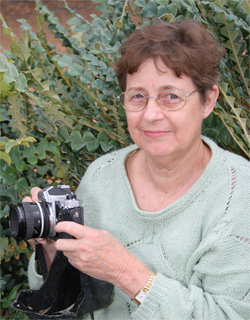
Headshot of Margaret Pieroni

Margaret Pieroni OAM, born in 1936 in New South Wales, Australia, is a Western Australian botanical artist, photographer, and botanist who has authored, co-authored, and been featured as an illustrator in books on Australian botany.

As a founding member of the Dryandra Study Group, Pieroni has been a leading figure in the study of this plant genus since 1987. She is recognized for a significant contribution to specimen collection, photography and horticultural research into dryandras, series Banksia ser. Dryandra, formerly regarded as genus Dryandra.

She was awarded the Medal of the Order of Australia in the 2024 Australia Day Honours for "service to botanical art".

== Early life ==
Pieroni was born in 1936 in New South Wales, Australia.

=== Education ===
Once Pieroni graduated from high school she began a three-year program at East Sydney Technical College. After getting her degree she began working as an advertising artist. She held this job position for roughly twenty years before a Leukemia Diagnosis changed the course of her career.

=== Leukemia diagnosis ===
In 1969, Pieroni received a diagnosis for acute leukemia. She was successfully treated after three years of chemotherapy. After her recovery, Pieroni decided to take a bucket-list trip to Western Australia to see the wildflowers. The inspiration for this trip came from her parents.

=== Western Australia trip ===
Pieroni began her trip across the Nullarbor plains into the countryside with her parents. Unable to rely on the internet to identify species, Pieroni used photographs and descriptions from books to identify plants. It was during this trip, which she never thought she would make, that she began plotting her career switch towards botany.

After returning home, Pieroni's husband purchased a house for them in Perth, Australia. Once arriving in Perth, Pieroni began sending enquiries to the Western Australia Herbarium, looking for work as a botanical illustrator. These first applications did not get her a job, but, after joining the Wildflower Society of Western Australia, Pieroni began being noticed by other botanists. This marked the true beginning of her new career in the world of botany, which lasted for over twenty years.

Pieroni's Western Australia trip has been described by Pieroni as life changing, specifically stating that “after three years of chemotherapy, I made a long-wished-for trip to Western Australia to see the wildflowers and consequently moved to Perth, never thinking I would live so long and be able to immerse myself in studying and painting and drawing the plants."

== Botany and botanical art career ==
=== Career timeline ===
Pieroni's career began by creating illustrations, paintings, and photographs of local flora alongside botanists and herbariums for papers and books. Specifically, she focused her work on Dryandras, a series of species of wildflowers. Additionally, Pieroni undertook horticultural research.

Pieroni describes the early years of her career in an interview in which she says, “I started doing illustrations for [the Wildflower Society of WA] and they got noticed by the botanists and the herbarium."

In 1983, after working with local botanists, she joined the Dryandra Study Group of the Australian Native Plants Society, and then became their leader in 1987. Her work with this group was driven by the specimen collections of local herbariums. Because only half the specimen collected had been named, Pieroni and the Dryandra Study Group helped discover and name the remaining species. All of Pieroni's work with this organization resulted in her co-authorship of The Dryandras in 2007, which was heavily aided by Tony Cavanagh.

In 1991, at an exhibition at the Art Gallery of Western Australia titled Wildflowers in Art – an exhibit featuring a painting done by Pieroni – she, and six Western Australian botanical artists, including botanist Frederica Lucy Erickson (Rica), founded the Botanical Artists Group of Western Australia. Her work with this group culminated with the publication of the book Brush and Gondwana in 2008.

Pieroni was also a member of several other groups in Australia including: the Society for Growing Australian Plants, the Wildflower Society of Western Australia, and the Watercolor Society of Western Australia.

Pieroni worked with many botanists during her time in Western Australia, including Elizabeth George – the author of the 2002 book Verticordia: the turner of hearts, in which she provided 100 botanical paintings.

=== Publications ===
Discovering the Wildflowers of Western Australia, published by Pieroni in 1993, was a solo publication by Pieroni. The 48-page book consists of flower paintings each with a detailed description of the plant. Pieroni describes each of these paintings as a “personal discovery,” a sentiment she hopes readers share as they “discover them for themselves and to study and grow them.”

The Dryandras, published in 2007, is a standout publication for Pieroni as it encapsulates the work which resulted in her receiving a Medal of the Order of Australia for expanding study of Dryandras. As described by the authors, the 244-page book “provides full information on all 135 taxa (94 species and 41 subspecies and varieties) as well as several unnamed species. For each, there is a botanical description, distribution map, conservation status, habitat including climate information, flowering period as well as propagation and cultivation information." Supplementing this information are color photographs of the plant and line drawings of leaves, fruit, seeds, and seedlings – all of which were provided by Pieroni.

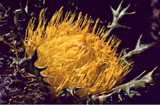
Photo of a Dryandra by Margaret Pieroni from The Dryandras

Pieroni's illustrations and photographs in The Dryandras were generally well received. Specifically, a reviewer of the book wrote that “the photography is excellent. There are several photos of the plants – from a close-up of the flower to the habit of the species, and all large enough to see… The illustrations of the leaf, seedling, follicle and seed for each species assist in diagnosing the specimen and it places this book amongst others on the top shelf of specialist books on Australian flora." This review echoed similar sentiments by other book reviewers.

In 2008, the 144-page book Brush with Gondwana was published by “seven leading botanical artists,” including over 100 illustrations of flora, fauna, and fungi. One review from Artist’s Chronicle describes the book as “lavishly illustrated with a variety of native floral species as well as funghi and native orchids and provides an important record of this influential group [of artists]."

=== Post career ===
In 2005, Pieroni moved from Perth to Denmark, Australia. She moved into her “dream house” which was located on an area of bushland. Pieroni continued growing native wildflowers on her property, with Dryandras still being a fascination of hers.

Pieroni continued to work on illustrations and paintings from her new house, but the move signified her similar move away from botany. At this point, Pieroni was not in the field, collecting samples and taking photographs, but rather growing her own plants, painting them or drawing illustrations for other scientists. Pieroni also created her own paintings unrelated to the study of botany, some of which have been presented at Western Australian art auctions – one piece selling for $322, recorded in the Australian and New Zealand Art Sales Digest.

== Conservation hopes ==
Pieroni hopes that her art will not be the sole remembrance of the wildflowers she worked with. Instead, she wishes that her work will inspire people to celebrate how special wildflowers and other native plants are. She wishes that people would view them as special, scientific things rather than randomly growing fields of color.

She shares these desires in a 2024 interview from the Albany Advertiser, where she says that “I don’t want my works to be the only memory of some of these species. I want them to be there to help people find and identify them." Pieroni also hopes that botanical illustrations will still have a place within botany – something that she personally believes because scientifically correct botanical illustrates are better than pictures at showing “identifying details,” according to Pieroni.

Pieroni's hopes for conservation of botanical drawings stems back to her trip to Western Australia, where she only had photographs and textual descriptions to distinguish the plants.

== Awards and recognition ==
On 25 January 2024, Pieroni received a Medal of the Order of Australia (OAM) during Australia Day for her contributions to botanical art. By the end of her career, which ended after her back pain and eyesight problems made it too difficult for her to work, she had studied and taken pictures of all species of Dryandra – eight of which had been undiscovered, and many others undocumented.

From 20 July to 30 October 2016, some of Pieroni's work was displayed in the Florilegium Society of the Royal Botanic Gardens, Sydney in the RBGS Gardens to commemorate the garden's 200th anniversary. This exhibit was shown once again from 31 March to 16 September 2018.

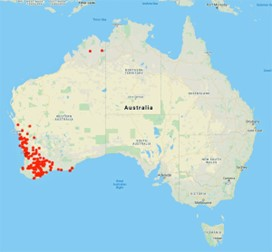
Map showing where in Australia Margaret Pieroni found Dryandra samples

This exhibition displayed the work of 64 different artists – both from Australia and around the world, and was funded by Susan Maple-Brown AM. The art presented featured common motifs in botanical art, including growth, reproduction, decay and renewal, which were also common in Pieroni's artwork. A book titled “The Florilegium, The Royal Botanic Gardens Sydney” was sold at the botanical garden alongside the exhibition.

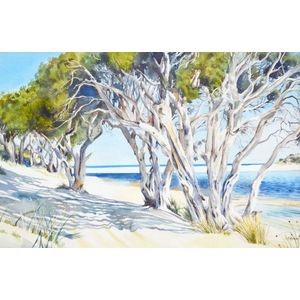
Painting by Margaret Pieroni which sold for $322

== Selected works ==
- Powell, Robert (2009), Leaf and Branch, Western Australian Naturalists' Club Incorporated, ISBN 978-0-9806417-3-8
- McMillan, Peter; Grant, Richard; Pieroni, Margaret; Staniland, Carmel; Western Australia. Department of Conservation and Land Management; McMillan, Peter; Pieroni, Margaret; Western Australia. Dept. of Conservation and Land Management (1990), Exploring granite outcrops, Dept. of Conservation and Land Management
- Discovering The Wildflowers Of Western AustraliaPaperback, Quality Publishing Australia, 1993, ISBN 978-1-875737-72-7
- Gooding, Janda; Erickson, Rica, 1908-; Gooding, Janda; Erickson, Rica (2008), Brush with Gondwana : Botanical Artists Group of Western Australia, Fremantle Press, ISBN 978-1-921361-26-5
- George, Elizabeth A; Pieroni, Margaret; Australian Biological Resources Study (2002), Verticordia : the turner of hearts, University Of Western Australia Press [in association with] Australian Biological Resources Study; [Lancaster : Gazelle], ISBN 978-1-876268-46-6
