= Austin Mast =

American botanist and academic

Austin R. Mast
- Education: University of Wisconsin-Madison
- Scientific career
- Workplaces: Florida State University

Austin R. Mast is a research botanist. Born in 1972, he obtained a Ph.D. from the University of Wisconsin–Madison in 2000. He is currently a professor within the Department of Biological Science at Florida State University (FSU), and has been director of FSU's Robert K. Godfrey Herbarium since August 2003.

One of his main areas of research is the phylogenetics of Grevilleoideae, a subfamily of Proteaceae. In 2005 he showed the genus Banksia to be paraphyletic with respect to Dryandra, Collaborating with Australian botanist Kevin Thiele, he subsequently transferred all Dryandra taxa to Banksia, publishing over 120 taxonomic names in the process. The change has been adopted by the Western Australian Herbarium, although has met with some controversy.

He has previously worked on the Deep South Plant Specimen Imaging Project, which created a repository of annotated high-resolution digital images of plant specimens within the East Gulf Coastal Plain, a region with a very high diversity of rare and endangered plants.

The standard author abbreviation A.R.Mast is used to indicate this person as the author when citing a botanical name.

== Taxa named by Mast ==
- Category:Taxa named by Austin Mast
