= Dryandra subg. Dryandra =

Obsolete clade of plants

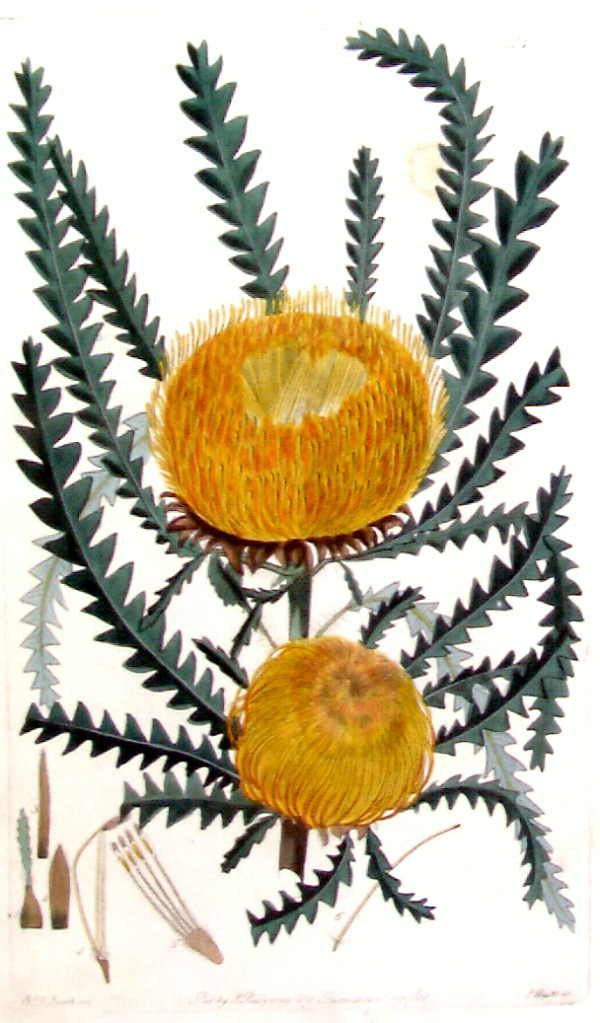
Dryandra formosa (now Banksia formosa), the type species of Dryandra subg. Dryandra

Dryandra subg. Dryandra is an obsolete clade of plant. It was a series within the former genus Dryandra (now Banksia ser. Dryandra). The name was first published at sectional rank as Dryandra verae in 1830, before being renamed Eudryandra in 1847, the replaced by the autonym at subgenus rank in 1996. It was ultimately discarded in 2007 when Austin Mast and Kevin Thiele sunk Dryandra into Banksia.

== Brown's Dryandra verae ==
Dryandra verae ("True Dryandra") was published by Brown in his 1830 Supplementum primum Prodromi florae Novae Hollandiae. Brown's arrangement of Dryandra split a single species out into a separate genus, and divided the remaining Dryandra species into three groups according to what Brown perceived to be variations in the number of seed separators. He allowed for these groups to be treated at subgenus or section rank, but they are now treated as having been published as sections. Dryandra verae was defined as containing those species with a single seed separator per follicle. Its placement and circumscription may be summarised as follows:

Dryandra (now B. ser. Dryandra)

Dryandra verae

D. floribunda (now B. sessilis)
D. cuneata (now B. obovata)
D. armata (now B. armata)
D. Serra (now B. serra)
D. concinna (now B. concinna)
D. foliolata (now B. foliolata)
D. squarrosa (now B. squarrosa)
D. formosa (now B. formosa)
D. mucronulata (now B. mucronulata)
D. Baxteri (now B. biterax)
D. plumosa (now B. plumosa)
D. obtusa (now B. obtusa)
D. arctotidis (now B. arctotidis)
D. nivea (now B. nivea)
D. Fraseri (now B. fraseri)
D. longifolia (now B. prolata)
D. seneciifolia (now B. seneciifolia)
D. tenuifolia (now B. tenuis)

D. sect. Diplophragma (1 species)
D. sect. Aphragma (4 species)

Hemiclidia (1 species)

== Meissner's Eudryandra ==
Dryandra verae was renamed Eudryandra by Stephan Endlicher in 1847, and this name was used in the 1856 arrangement of Carl Meissner. Meissner retained all three of Brown's sections, and further divided D. sect. Eudryandra in 8 subgroups of unstated rank designated by the section sign ("§").The placement and circumscription of D. sect. Eudryandra in Meissner's arrangement thus looks like this:

Dryandra (now Banksia ser. Dryandra)

D. sect. Eudryandra

D. § Ilicinæ (4 species, 2 varieties)

D. praemorsa (now B. undata)

D. praemorsa var. elongata (now B. undata var. undata)

D. quercifolia (now B. heliantha)
D. cuneata (now B. obovata)
D. floribunda (now B. sessilis var. sessilis)

D. floribunda var. cordata (now B. sessilis var. cordata)

D. § Runcinatæ (5 species)

D. armata (now B. armata)
D. carduacea (now B. squarrosa subsp. squarrosa)
D. runcinata (now B. r. subsp. rufa)
D. nobilis (now B. nobilis)
D. plumosa (now B. plumosa)

D. § Serratæ (11 species, 3 varieties)

D. stupposa (now B. stuposa)
D. serra (now B. serra)
D. mucronulata (now B. mucronulata)
D. foliolata (now B. foliolata)
D. mutica (now B. foliolata)
D. obtusa (now B. obtusa)
D. Baxteri (now B. biterax)
D. formosa (now B. formosa)
D. nivea (now B. nivea)

D. nivea var. venosa (now B. nivea)
D. nivea var. subevenia (now B. dallanneyi var. dallanneyi)

D. brownii (now B. brunnea)
D. lindleyana (now B. dallanneyi)

D. § Marginatæ (7 species)

D. stenoprion (now B. stenoprion)
D. elegans (now B. tenuis var. tenuis)
D. pulchella (now B. bella)
D. Kippistiana (now B. kippistiana)
D. Shuttleworthiana (now B. shuttleworthiana)
D. sclerophylla (now B. sclerophylla)
D. squarrosa (now B. squarrosa)

D. § Pectinatæ (6 species)

D. serratuloides (now B. serratuloides)
D. nana (now B. nana)
D. arctotidis (now B. arctotidis)

D. tortifolia (now B. tortifolia)

D. Fraseri (now B. fraseri)
D. cirsioides (now B. cirsioides)

D. § Decurrentes (11 species)

D. seneciifolia (now B. seneciifolia)
D. horrida (now B. horrida)
D. concinna (now B. concinna)
D. vestita (now B. vestita)
D. Hewardiana (now B. hewardiana)
D. longifolia (now B. prolata)
D. comosa (now B. comosa)
D. proteoides (now B. proteoides)
D. tenuifolia (now B. tenuis)
D. ferruginea (now B. rufa)
D. cryptocephala (now B. seneciifolia)

D. § Acrodontæ (2 species)

D. carlinoides (now B. carlinoides)
D. tridentata (now B. tridentata)

D. § Haplophyllæ (1 species)

D. speciosa (now B. splendida)

D. sect. Diplophragma (2 species)
D. sect. Aphragma (4 species, 4 varieties)

Hemiclidia (1 species)

== Bentham's Eudryandra ==
When George Bentham published his arrangement of Dryandra in his 1870 Flora Australiensis, he retained D. sect. Eubanksia, but discarded all eight of Meissner's groups within that section, replacing them with seven series defined using floral characters:

Dryandra (now Banksia ser. Dryandra)

D. sect. Eudryandra

D. ser. Armatae (7 species)

D. quercifolia (now B. heliantha)
D. praemorsa (now B. undata)
D. cuneata (now B. obovata)
D. falcata (now B. falcata)
D. armata (now B. armata)
D. longifolia (now B. prolata)
D. Fraseri (now B. fraseri)

D. ser. Floribundae (5 species, 2 varieties)

D. floribunda (now B. sessilis var. sessilis)

D. floribunda var. major (now B. sessilis var. cordata)

D. carduacea (now B. squarrosa subsp. squarrosa)
D. carlinoides (now B. carlinoides)
D. polycephala (now B. polycephala)
D. Kippistiana (now B. kippistiana)

D. ser. Concinnae (4 species)

D. squarrosa (now B. squarrosa)
D. serra (now B. serra)
D. concinna (now B. concinna)
D. foliolata (now B. foliolata)

D. ser. Formosae (5 species)

D. stupposa (now B. stuposa)
D. nobilis (now B. nobilis)
D. mucronulata (now B. mucronulata)
D. formosa (now B. formosa)
D. Baxteri (now B. biterax)

D. ser. Niveæ (4 species, 2 varieties)

D. nivea (now B. nivea)
D. arctotidis (now B. arctotidis)

D. arctotidis var. tortifolia (now B. tortifolia)

D. nana (now B. nana)
D. Preissii (now B. acuminata)

D. ser. Obvallatae (12 species)

D. sclerophylla (now B. sclerophylla)
D. pulchella (now B. bella)
D. plumosa (now B. plumosa)
D. seneciifolia (now B. seneciifolia)
D. vestita (now B. vestita)
D. cirsioides (now B. cirsioides)
D. Hewardiana (now B. hewardiana)
D. patens (now B. hewardiana)
D. conferta (now B. densa)
D. horrida (now B. horrida)
D. serratuloides (now B. serratuloides)
D. comosa (now B. comosa)

D. ser. Gymnocephalae (3 species)

D. Shuttleworthiana (now B. shuttleworthiana)
D. speciosa (now B. splendida)
D. tridentata (now B. tridentata)

D. sect. Aphragma (7 species, 2 varieties)

== According to George ==
By the time Alex George published his revision of Dryandra in 1996, the rules of botanical nomenclature mandated that any infrageneric taxon that contained the type species of the genus be given an autonym. Thus D. sect. Eudryandra was treated as illegitimate, and when George published essentially the same taxon at subgenus rank, it was instead named D. subg. Dryandra. This was by far the largest of George's three subgenera, containing all but three Dryandra species. George further divided it into 24 series, reviving most of Meissner's and Bentham's names in the process. The placement and circumscription of D. subg. Dryandra in George's arrangement, as amended in 1999 and 2005, may be summarised as follows:

Dryandra (now Banksia ser. Dryandra)

D. subg. Dryandra

D. ser. Floribundae

D. sessilis (now B. sessilis)

D. sessilis var. sessilis (now B. sessilis var. sessilis)
D. sessilis var. flabellifolia (now B. sessilis var. flabellifolia)
D. sessilis var. cordata (now B. sessilis var. cordata)
D. sessilis var. cygnorum (now B. sessilis var. cygnorum)

D. ser. Armatae

D. cuneata (now B. obovata)
D. fuscobractea (now B. fuscobractea)
D. armata (now B. armata)

D. armata var. armata (now B. armata var. armata)
D. armata var. ignicida (now B. armata var. ignicida)

D. prionotes (now B. prionophylla
D. arborea (now B. arborea)
D. hirsuta (now B. hirta)
D. pallida (now B. pallida)
D. purdieana (now B. purdieana)
D. xylothemelia (now B. xylothemelia)
D. cirsioides (now B. cirsioides)
D. acanthopoda (now B. acanthopoda)
D. squarrosa (now B. squarrosa)

D. squarrosa subsp. squarrosa (now B. squarrosa subsp. squarrosa)
D. squarrosa subsp. argillacea (now B. squarrosa subsp. argillacea)

D. hewardiana (now B. hewardiana)
D. wonganensis (now B. wonganensis)
D. trifontinalis (now B. trifontinalis)
D. stricta (now B. strictifolia)
D. echinata (now B. echinata)
D. polycephala (now B. polycephala)
D. subpinnatifida (now B. subpinnatifida)

D. subpinnatifida var. subpinnatifida (now B. subpinnatifida var. subpinnatifida)
D. subpinnatifida var. imberbis (now B. subpinnatifida var. imberbis)

D. longifolia (now B. prolata)

D. longifolia subsp. longifolia (now B. prolata subsp. prolata)
D. longifolia subsp. calcicola (now B. prolata subsp. calcicola)
D. longifolia subsp. archeos (now B. prolata subsp. archeos)

D. borealis (now B. borealis)

D. borealis subsp. borealis (now B. borealis subsp. borealis)
D. borealis subsp. elatior (now B. borealis subsp. elatior)

D. ser. Marginatae

D. pulchella (now B. bella)

D. ser. Folliculosae

D. fraseri (now B. fraseri)

D. fraseri var. fraseri (now B. fraseri var. fraseri)
D. fraseri var. crebra (now B. fraseri var. crebra)
D. fraseri var. effusa (now B. fraseri var. effusa)
D. fraseri var. ashbyi (now B. fraseri var. ashbyi)
D. fraseri var. oxycedra (now B. fraseri var. oxycedra)

D. ser. Acrodontae

D. sclerophylla (now B. sclerophylla)
D. kippistiana (now B. kippistiana)

D. kippistiana var. kippistiana (now B. kippistiana var. kippistiana)
D. kippistiana var. paenepeccata (now B. kippistiana var. paenepeccata)

D. carlinoides (now B. carlinoides)
D. tridentata (now B. tridentata)

D. ser. Capitellatae

D. serratuloides (now B. serratuloides)

D. serratuloides subsp. serratuloides (now B. serratuloides subsp. serratuloides)
D. serratuloides subsp. perissa (now B. serratuloides subsp. perissa)

D. meganotia (now B. meganotia)

D. ser. Ilicinae

D. praemorsa (now B. undata)

D. praemorsa var. praemorsa (now B. undata var. undata)
D. praemorsa var. splendens (now B. undata var. splendens)

D. quercifolia (now B. heliantha)
D. anatona (now B. anatona)

D. ser. Dryandra

D. formosa (now B. formosa)
D. nobilis (now B. nobilis)

D. nobilis subsp. nobilis (now B. nobilis subsp. nobilis)
D. nobilis subsp. fragrans (now B. nobilis subsp. fragrans)

D. stuposa (now B. stuposa)

D. ser. Foliosae

D. mucronulata (now B. mucronulata)

D. mucronulata subsp. mucronulata (now B. mucronulata subsp. mucronulata)
D. mucronulata subsp. retrorsa (now B. mucronulata subsp. retrorsa)

D. baxteri (now B. biterax)
D. foliosissima (now B. foliosissima)

D. ser. Decurrentes

D. comosa (now B. comosa)

D. ser. Tenuifoliae

D. tenuifolia (now B. tenuis)

D. tenuifolia var. tenuifolia (now B. tenuis var. tenuis)
D. tenuifolia var. reptans (now B. tenuis var. reptans)

D. obtusa (now B. obtusa)

D. ser. Runcinatae

D. ferruginea (now B. rufa)

D. ferruginea subsp. magma (now B. rufa subsp. magma)
D. ferruginea subsp. tutanningensis (now B. rufa subsp. tutanningensis)
D. ferruginea subsp. ferruginea (now B. rufa subsp. rufa)
D. ferruginea subsp. pumila (now B. rufa subsp. pumila)
D. ferruginea subsp. obliquiloba (now B. rufa subsp. obliquiloba)
D. ferruginea subsp. chelomacarpa (now B. rufa subsp. chelomacarpa)
D. ferruginea subsp. flavescens (now B. rufa subsp. flavescens)

D. corvijuga (now B. corvijuga)
D. epimicta (now B. epimicta)
D. proteoides (now B. proteoides)

D. ser. Triangulares

D. drummondii (now B. drummondii)

D. drummondii subsp. drummondii (now B. drummondii subsp. drummondii)
D. drummondii subsp. hiemalis (now B. drummondii subsp. hiemalis)
D. drummondii subsp. macrorufa (now B. drummondii subsp. macrorufa)

D. octotriginta (now B. octotriginta)
D. catoglypta (now B. catoglypta)

D. ser. Aphragma

D. pteridifolia (now B. pteridifolia)

D. pteridifolia subsp. inretita (now B. pteridifolia subsp. inretita)
D. pteridifolia subsp. pteridifolia (now B. pteridifolia subsp. pteridifolia)
D. pteridifolia subsp. vernalis (now B. pteridifolia subsp. vernalis)

D. fililoba (now B. fililoba)
D. shanklandiorum (now B. shanklandiorum)
D. nervosa (now B. alliacea)
D. blechnifolia (now B. pellaeifolia)
D. porrecta (now B. porrecta)
D. aurantia (now B. aurantia)
D. calophylla (now B. calophylla)
D. lepidorhiza (now B. lepidorhiza)

D. ser. Ionthocarpae

D. ionthocarpa (now B. ionthocarpa)

D. ionthocarpa subsp. ionthocarpa (now B. ionthocarpa subsp. ionthocarpa)
D. ionthocarpa subsp. chrysophoenix (now B. ionthocarpa subsp. chrysophoenix)

D. ser. Inusitatae

D. idiogenes (now B. idiogenes)

D. ser. Subulatae

D. subulata (now B. subulata)

D. ser. Gymnocephalae

D. cynaroides (now B. cynaroides)
D. erythrocephala (now B. erythrocephala)

D. erythrocephala var. erythrocephala (now B. erythrocephala var. erythrocephala)
D. erythrocephala var. inopinata (now B. erythrocephala var. inopinata)

D. horrida (now B. horrida)
D. vestita (now B. vestita)
D. viscida (now B. viscida)
D. mimica (now B. mimica)
D. speciosa (now B. splendida)

D. speciosa subsp. speciosa (now B. speciosa subsp. splendida)
D. speciosa subsp. macrocarpa (now B. speciosa subsp. macrocarpa)

D. shuttleworthiana (now B. shuttleworthiana)

D. ser. Plumosae

D. plumosa (now B. plumosa)

D. plumosa subsp. plumosa (now B. plumosa subsp. plumosa)
D. plumosa subsp. denticulata (now B. plumosa subsp. denticulata)

D. pseudoplumosa (now B. pseudoplumosa)
D. montana (now B. montana)

D. ser. Concinnae

D. concinna (now B. concinna)
D. serra (now B. serra)
D. foliolata (now B. foliolata)

D. ser. Obvallatae

D. fasciculata (now B. fasciculata)
D. conferta (now B. densa)

D. conferta var. conferta (now B. densa var. densa)
D. conferta var. parva (now B. densa var. parva)

D. columnaris (now B. columnaris)
D. platycarpa (now B. platycarpa)
D. seneciifolia (now B. seneciifolia)
D. rufistylis (now B. rufistylis)
D. insulanemorecincta (now B. insulanemorecincta)

D. ser. Pectinatae

D. nana (now B. nana)

D. ser. Acuminatae

D. preissii (now B. acuminata)

D. ser. Niveae

D. arctotidis (now B. arctotidis)
D. tortifolia (now B. tortifolia)
D. stenoprion (now B. stenoprion)
D. cypholoba (now B. cypholoba)
D. lindleyana (now B. dallanneyi)

D. lindleyana subsp. lindleyana (now B. dallanneyi subsp. dallanneyi)
D. lindleyana subsp. pollosta (now B. dallanneyi subsp. pollosta)
D. lindleyana subsp. media (now B. dallanneyi subsp. media)
D. lindleyana subsp. agricola (now B. dallanneyi subsp. agricola)
D. lindleyana subsp. sylvestris (now B. dallanneyi subsp. sylvestris)

D. brownii (now B. brunnea)
D. nivea (now B. nivea)

D. nivea subsp. nivea (now B. nivea subsp. nivea)
D. nivea subsp. uliginosa (now B. nivea subsp. uliginosa)

D. subg. Hemiclidia (2 species)
D. subg. Diplophragma (1 species)

== Recent developments ==
Since 1998, Austin Mast has been publishing results of ongoing cladistic analyses of DNA sequence data for the subtribe Banksiinae. His analyses have provided compelling evidence of the paraphyly of Banksia with respect to Dryandra; that is, it seems that Dryandra arose from within the ranks of Banksia. Early in 2007, Mast and Kevin Thiele initiated a rearrangement of Banksia by sinking Dryandra into it as B. ser. Dryandra. This transfer necessitated the setting aside of George's infrageneric arrangement of Dryandra; thus D. subg. Dryandra is no longer current. Mast and Thiele have foreshadowed publishing a full arrangement once DNA sampling of Dryandra is complete.
