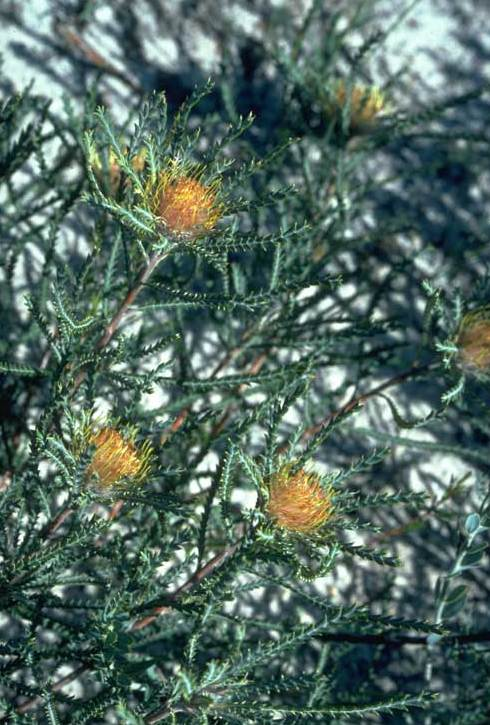

Scientific classification
- Kingdom: Plantae
- Clade: Tracheophytes
- Clade: Angiosperms
- Clade: Eudicots
- Order: Proteales
- Family: Proteaceae
- Genus: Banksia
- Subgenus: Banksia subg. Banksia
- Series: Banksia ser. Dryandra
- Species: B. sclerophylla

Binomial name
- Banksia sclerophylla (Meisn.) A.R.Mast & K.R.Thiele

Synonyms
- Dryandra sclerophylla Meisn.; Josephia sclerophylla (Meisn.) Kuntze

= Banksia sclerophylla =

Species of shrub endemic to Western Australia

Banksia sclerophylla is a species of shrub that is endemic to the south-west of Western Australia. It has spreading stems, linear, pinnatipid leaves with triangular lobes on the sides, yellow flowers in heads of between forty and seventy, and elliptical follicles.

== Description ==
Banksia scelerophylla is a shrub with spreading, hairy stems, that typically grows to a height of 60 cm (24 in) and forms a lignotuber. The leaves are linear and pinnatifid, 60–130 mm (2.4–5.1 in) long and 4–6 mm (0.16–0.24 in) wide on a petiole 2–5 mm (0.079–0.197 in) long. There are between ten and thirty triangular lobes on each side of the leaves. The flowers are yellow and arranged in a head of between forty and seventy on the ends of the stems with pale, lance-shaped involucral bracts covered with rust-coloured hairs, and up to 15 mm (0.59 in) long at the base of the head. The perianth is 19–22 mm (0.75–0.87 in) long and the pistil 25–27 mm (0.98–1.06 in) long and gently curved. Flowering occurs from September to October and the follicles are elliptical, 7–9 mm (0.28–0.35 in) long and 8–10 mm (0.31–0.39 in) wide.

== Taxonomy and naming ==
This species was first formally described in 1855 by Carl Meissner who gave it the name Dryandra sclerophylla and published the description in Hooker's Journal of Botany and Kew Garden Miscellany from specimens collected by James Drummond. The specific epithet (sclerophylla) is from ancient Greek word-elements meaning "hard" and "-leaved".

In 2007 Austin Mast and Kevin Thiele transferred all dryandras to the genus Banksia and renamed this species Banksia sclerophylla.

== Distribution and habitat ==
Banksia sclerophylla grows in kwongan between the Alexander Morrison National Park, Mount Lesueur and Badgingarra.

== Conservation status ==
This banksia is classified as "not threatened" by the Western Australian Government Department of Parks and Wildlife.
