= D. nana =

D. nana may refer to:

- Dalea nana, the dwarf Prairie clover, a flowering plant species in the genus Dalea
- Diascia nana, a flowering species of Diascia (plant)

== Synonyms ==
- Dianthoecia nana, a synonym for Hadena confusa, the marbled coronet, a moth species
- Dryandra nana, a synonym for Banksia nana, the dwarf dryandra, a shrub species endemic to Western Australia

== See also ==
- Nana (disambiguation)
