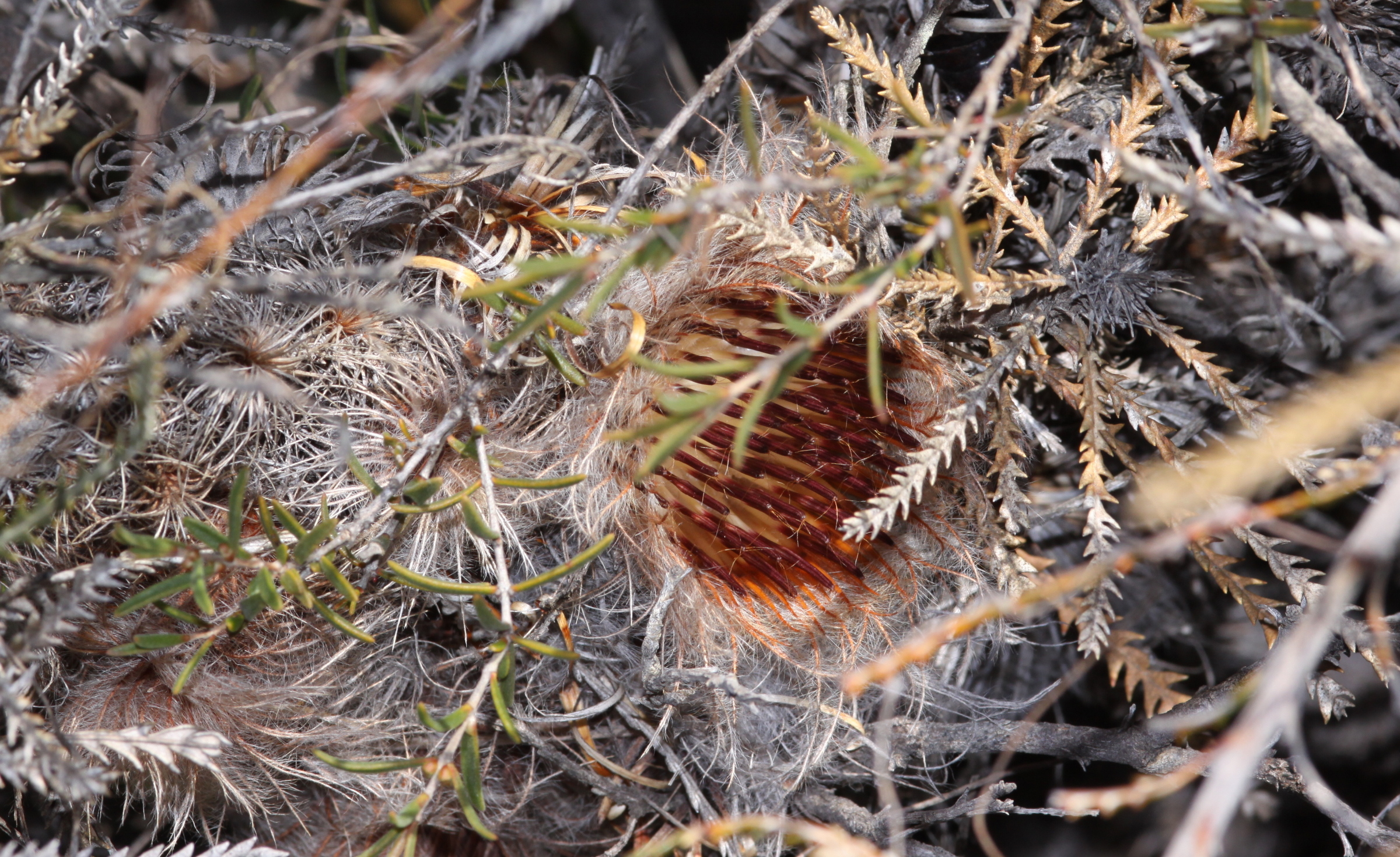
- Banksia shuttleworthiana at Alexander Morrison National Park, Western Australia

Scientific classification
- Kingdom: Plantae
- Clade: Tracheophytes
- Clade: Angiosperms
- Clade: Eudicots
- Order: Proteales
- Family: Proteaceae
- Genus: Banksia
- Subgenus: Banksia subg. Banksia
- Series: Banksia ser. Dryandra
- Species: B. shuttleworthiana

Binomial name
- Banksia shuttleworthiana (Meisn.) A.R.Mast & K.R.Thiele

Synonyms
- Dryandra shuttleworthiana Meisn.

= Banksia shuttleworthiana =

Bearded dryandra

Species of shrub endemic to Western Australia

Banksia shuttleworthiana, commonly known as bearded dryandra, is a species of low, spreading shrub that is endemic to Western Australia. It has thin, woolly-hairy stems, linear pinnatisect leaves, creamy brown to purplish flowers in heads of about forty and later, only a few egg-shaped follicles in each head.

== Description ==
Banksia shuttleworthiana is a low, spreading shrub that typically grows to a height of 70 cm (28 in) and forms a lignotuber. It has thin, woolly-hairy stems with undeveloped flower heads. The leaves are linear, pinnatisect, 30–140 mm (1.2–5.5 in) long and 4–7 mm (0.16–0.28 in) wide on a petiole about 5 mm (0.20 in) long. There are between fifteen and fifty triangular, pointed lobes on each side of the leaves. The flowers are creamy brown to purplish, have a strong, musky scent and are arranged in heads of between thirty and forty-five with thin, hairy involucral bracts 30–40 mm (1.2–1.6 in) long at the base of each head. The perianth is 25–35 mm (0.98–1.38 in) long and the pistil 24–35 mm (0.94–1.38 in) long and straight. Flowering occurs from July to September and the follicles are egg-shaped, 16–24 mm (0.63–0.94 in) long and hairy. Only a few follicles form in each head.

== Taxonomy ==
This species was first formally described in 1855 by Carl Meissner who gave it the name Dryandra shuttleworthiana and published the description in Hooker's Journal of Botany and Kew Garden Miscellany from specimens collected by James Drummond. In 2007 Austin Mast and Kevin Thiele transferred all dryandras to the genus Banksia and renamed this species Banksia shuttleworthiana.

== Distribution and habitat ==
Banksia shuttleworthiana grows in kwongan between Geraldton and Gingin in the Avon Wheatbelt, Geraldton Sandplains, Jarrah Forest and Swan Coastal Plain biogeographic regions.

== Conservation status ==
This banksia is classified as "not threatened" by the Western Australian Government Department of Parks and Wildlife.
