= Banksia tortifolia =

Scientific classification
- Kingdom: Plantae
- Clade: Tracheophytes
- Clade: Angiosperms
- Clade: Eudicots
- Order: Proteales
- Family: Proteaceae
- Genus: Banksia
- Subgenus: Banksia subg. Banksia
- Series: Banksia ser. Dryandra
- Species: B. tortifolia

Binomial name
- Banksia tortifolia (Kippist ex Meisn.) A.R.Mast & K.R.Thiele

Synonyms
- Dryandra arctotidis (Meisn.)Benth.; Dryandra tortifolia Kippist ex Meisn.

Species of shrub endemic to Western Australia

Banksia tortifolia is a small, spreading, prostrate shrub that is endemic to the southwest of Western Australia. It has short underground stems, pinnatipartite leaves with sharply-pointed, linear lobes on each side, greenish-cream, yellow and pink flowers in heads of about eighty, and glabrous, egg-shaped follicles.

== Description ==
Banksia tortifolia is a prostrate, spreading shrub with short, fire-resistant underground stems, and that typically grows to a height of 15–25 cm (5.9–9.8 in). The leaves are pinnatipartite, 100–170 mm (3.9–6.7 in) long and 7–13 mm (0.28–0.51 in) wide on a petiole 10–30 mm (0.39–1.18 in) long. There are between forty and eighty-five sharply-pointed, twisted, linear lobes on each side of the leaves. The flowers are arranged in heads of between seventy and ninety with a few hairy, thread-like involucral bracts up to 20 mm (0.79 in) long at the base of the head. The perianth is greenish cream and pink, 27–34 mm (1.1–1.3 in) long and the pistil pale yellow, 38–54 mm (1.5–2.1 in) long. Flowering occurs in October and the fruit is a glabrous, egg-shaped follicle 12–14 mm (0.47–0.55 in) long.

== Taxonomy and naming ==
This species was first formally described in 1855 by Carl Meissner from an unpublished description by Richard Kippist. Meissner's description was published in Hooker's Journal of Botany and Kew Garden Miscellany as Dryandra tortifolia.

In 1870, George Bentham demoted it to Dryandra arctotidis var. tortifolia in Flora Australiensis but in 1999 Alex George in 1999 resurrected the species D. tortifolia.

In 2007 Austin Mast and Kevin Thiele transferred all dryandras to the genus Banksia and renamed this species Banksia tortifolia.

== Distribution and habitat ==
Banksia tortifolia grows in kwongan between Eneabba and Cataby.

== Conservation status ==
This banksia is classified as "not threatened" by the Western Australian Government Department of Parks and Wildlife.
