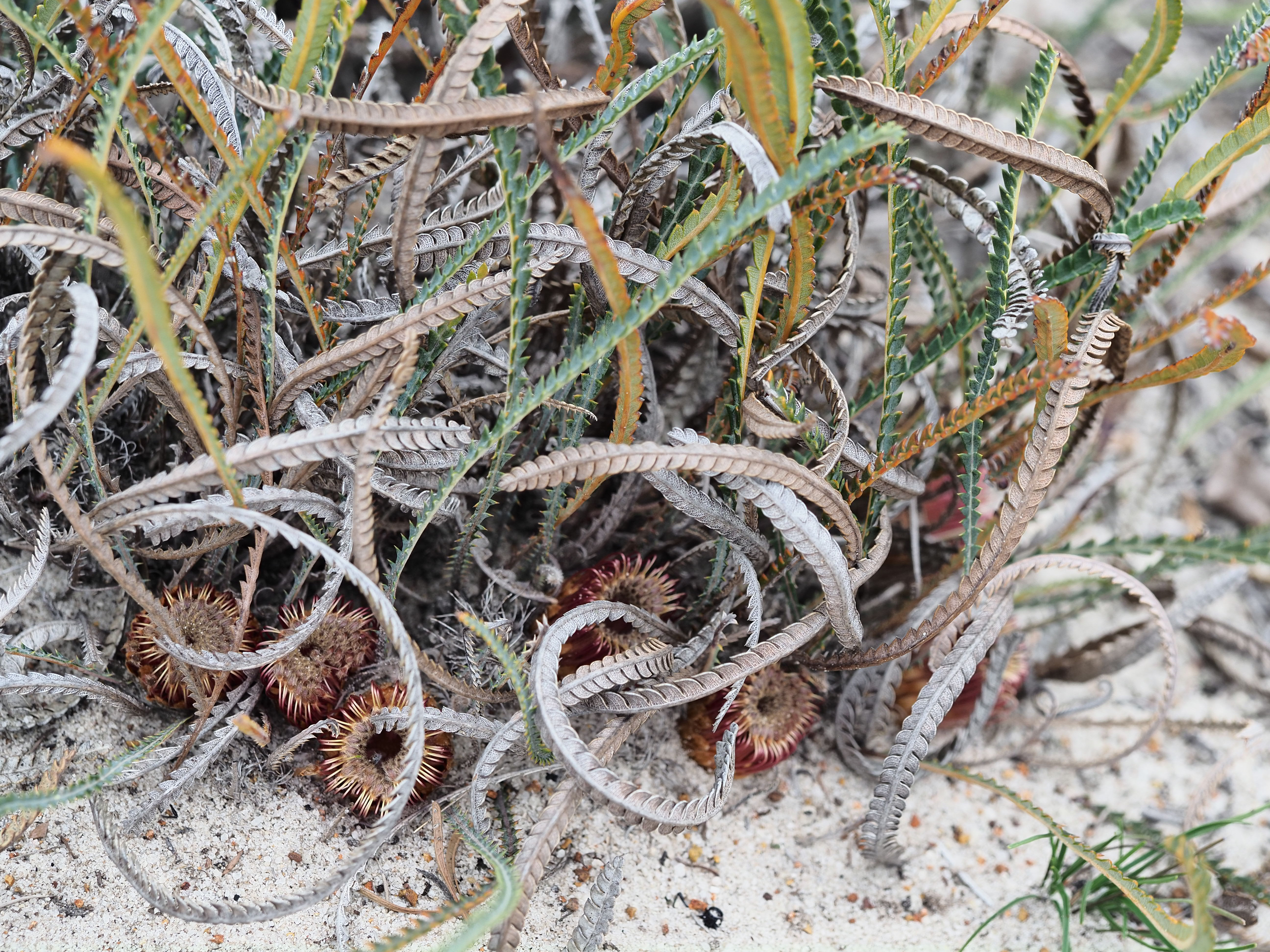
- Flowering in August 2021 at Hi Vallee Farm near Warradarge, Western Australia

Scientific classification
- Kingdom: Plantae
- Clade: Tracheophytes
- Clade: Angiosperms
- Clade: Eudicots
- Order: Proteales
- Family: Proteaceae
- Genus: Banksia
- Subgenus: Banksia subg. Banksia
- Series: Banksia ser. Dryandra
- Species: B. stenoprion

Binomial name
- Banksia stenoprion (Meisn.) A.R.Mast & K.R.Thiele

Synonyms
- Dryandra stenoprion Meisn.

= Banksia stenoprion =

Species of shrub native to Western Australia

Banksia stenoprion is a species of prostrate shrub that is endemic to the south-west of Western Australia. It has short, underground stems, pinnatisect leaves with triangular lobes, golden, mauve or purple flowers in heads of up to ninety, and egg-shaped follicles.

== Description ==
Banksia stenoprion is a prostrate shrub with short, underground, fire-resistant stems. It has leaves that are pinnatisect, V-shaped in cross-section, 120–200 mm (4.7–7.9 in) long and 3–9 mm (0.12–0.35 in) wide on a petiole 10–30 mm (0.39–1.18 in) long. There are between forty and eighty-five narrow triangular to elliptical lobes on each side of the leaves. The flowers are golden, mauve or purple, arranged in heads of between sixty and ninety with rusty-hairy involucral bracts 20–25 mm (0.79–0.98 in) long at the base of each head. The perianth is 28–35 mm (1.1–1.4 in) long and the pistil 38–41 mm (1.5–1.6 in) long. Flowering occurs from June to August and the follicles are egg-shaped, 12–15 mm (0.47–0.59 in) long and more or less glabrous.

== Taxonomy and naming ==
This species was first formally described in 1855 by Swiss botanist Carl Meissner who gave it the name Dryandra stenoprion and published the description in Hooker's Journal of Botany and Kew Garden Miscellany from specimens collected by James Drummond.

In 2007 Austin Mast and Kevin Thiele transferred all dryandras to the genus Banksia and renamed this species Banksia stenoprion.

== Distribution and habitat ==
Banksia stenoprion occurs from Cockleshell Gully near Mount Lesueur to Badgingarra, where it grows in kwongan.

== Conservation status ==
This banksia is classified as "not threatened" by the Western Australian Government Department of Parks and Wildlife.
