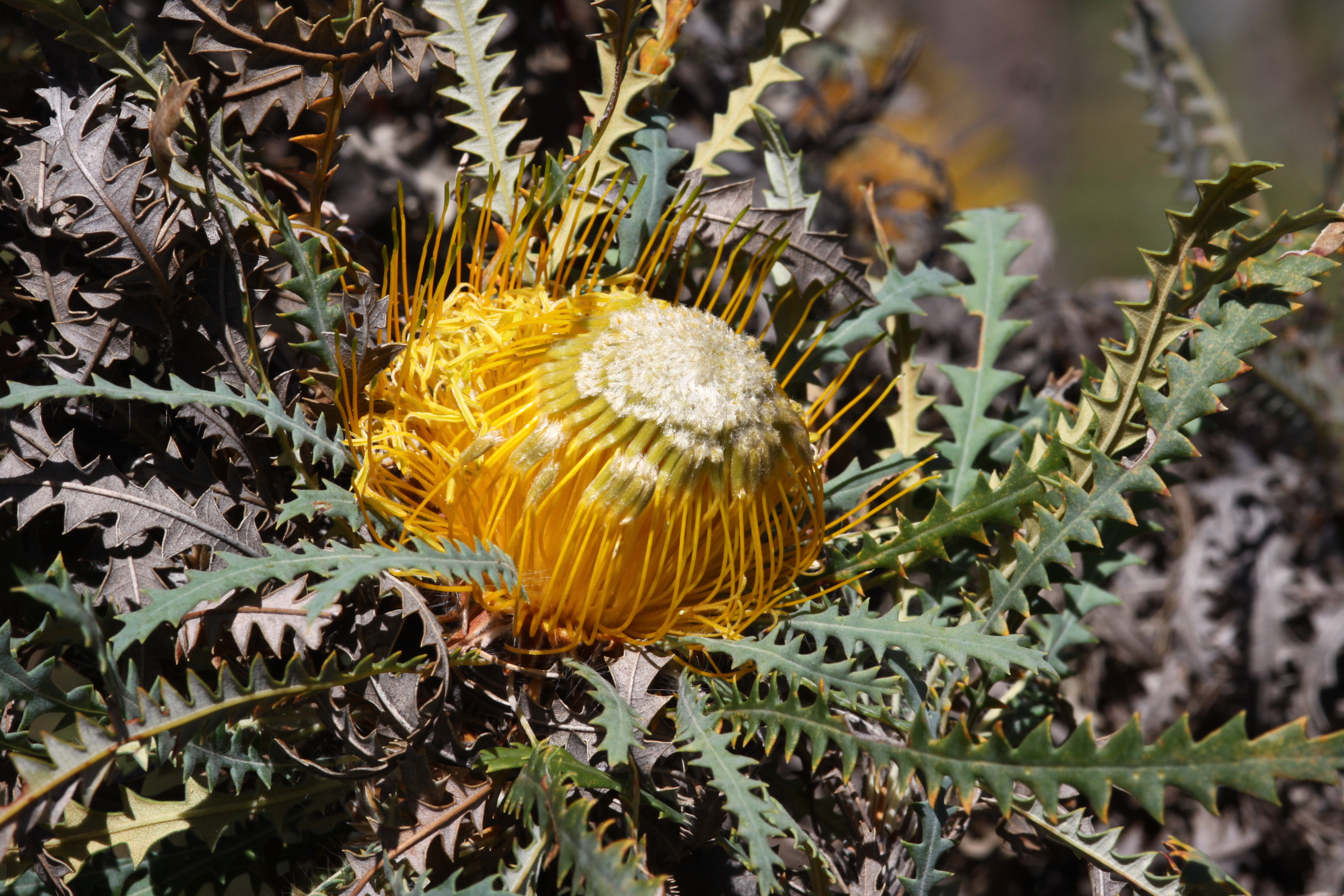
- At Boyagin Rock Nature Reserve

Scientific classification
- Kingdom: Plantae
- Clade: Tracheophytes
- Clade: Angiosperms
- Clade: Eudicots
- Order: Proteales
- Family: Proteaceae
- Genus: Banksia
- Subgenus: Banksia subg. Banksia
- Series: Banksia ser. Dryandra
- Species: B. stuposa

Binomial name
- Banksia stuposa (Lindl.) A.R.Mast & K.R.Thiele

Synonyms
- Dryandra stuposa Lindl.; Dryandra stupposa F.Muell. orth. var.; Josephia stuposa (Lindl.) Kuntze; Josephia stupposa Kuntze orth. var.

= Banksia stuposa =

Species of shrub endemic to Western Australia

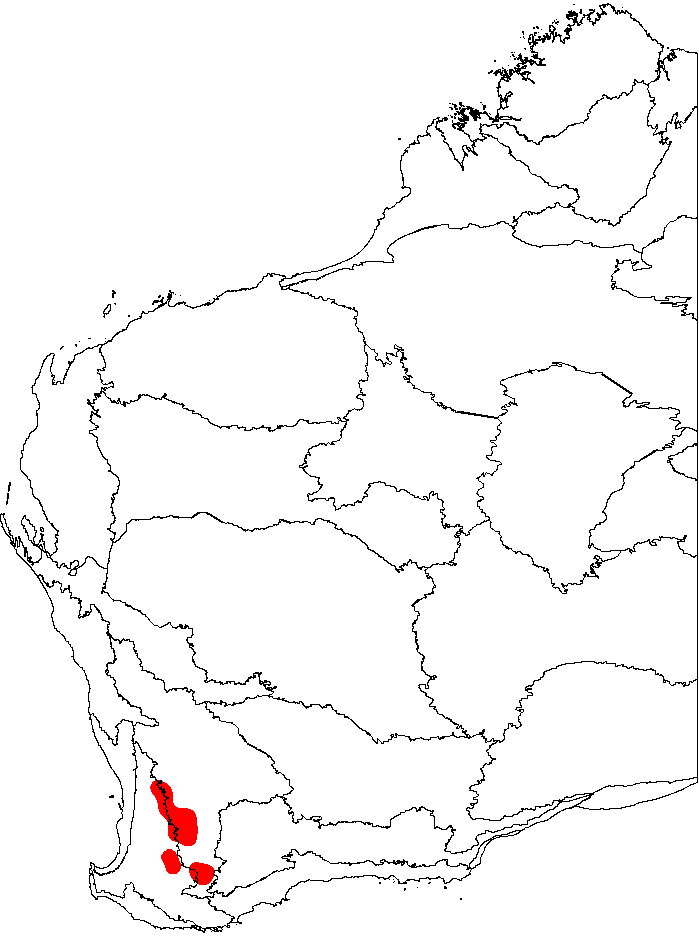
Distribution of B. stuposa

Banksia stuposa is a species of shrub that is endemic to the southwest of Western Australia. It has hairy stems, broadly linear pinnatifid leaves, golden yellow and white flowers in heads of one hundred or more, and hairy, egg-shaped follicles.

== Description ==
Banksia stuposa grows as a shrub up to 3 m (9.8 ft) high, without forming a lignotuber. It has broadly linear, pinnatifid leathery, bluish leaves, 50–150 mm (2.0–5.9 in) long and 7–14 mm (0.28–0.55 in) wide, on a petiole 5 to 8 millimetres (0.2 to 0.3 in) long on a petiole 5–8 mm (0.20–0.31 in) long. There are between fifteen and thirty triangular lobes on each side of the leaves. The flowers are golden yellow and white, arranged in heads of between 100 and 130 either terminally on a branch, or on short lateral branchlets. There are lance-shaped to egg-shaped, silky-hairy involucral bracts up to 15 mm (0.59 in) long at the base of the head. The perianth is 30–40 mm (1.2–1.6 in) long and the pistil 35–50 mm (1.4–2.0 in) long. Flowering occurs from January to May or from July to December and the fruit is an egg-shaped follicle 9–11 mm (0.35–0.43 in) long.

== Taxonomy and naming ==
This species was first described in 1840 by John Lindley in A Sketch of the Vegetation of the Swan River Colony and was given the name Dryandra stuposa, from specimens collected in the 1830s by James Drummond.

No etymology was given, but it is now accepted that it comes from the Latin stupposus ("covered with coarse, matted hairs"), in reference to the silky-woolly hairs on the involucral bracts. Lindley's dropping of a p from the name appears to have been a spelling error on his part, as he dropped the same p from stupposo in the Latin description. Lindley also did not specify his type material, but most of A Sketch of the Vegetation of the Swan River Colony is based upon the collections of Drummond.

A number of early publications took the liberty of correcting Lindley's spelling by referring to the species as D. stupposa. George Bentham did so in his 1870 Flora Australiensis, for example. So too did Otto Kuntze in 1891, when he made an unsuccessful attempt to transfer Dryandra to the older name Josephia, in the process publishing the name Josephia stupposa (Lindl.) Kuntze. Dryandra was retained, however, and in modern times the original orthography of the specific name has been restored.

In 1996, Alex George published a thorough revision of Dryandra and placed D. stuposa in D. subg. Dryandra, series Dryandra, along with D. formosa (showy dryandra) and D. nobilis (golden dryandra), with the latter considered this species' closest relative. This arrangement stood until 2007, when the genus Dryandra was transferred into Banksia by Austin Mast and Kevin Thiele, resulting in the publication of the current name for this species, Banksia stuposa (Lindl.) A.R.Mast & K.R.Thiele. As an interim measure, Mast and Thiele placed all the Dryandra species in B. ser. Dryandra.

== Distribution and habitat ==
Banksia stuposa occurs between York and Broomehill, in the Avon Wheatbelt and Jarrah Forest biogeographic regions of the Southwest Botanic Province. It grows on lateritic soils amongst mallee-kwongan or eucalypt woodland.

== Use in horticulture ==
Despite having large and attractive yellow flowers, many of which are terminal, this species is not often cultivated. It requires a well-drained heavy soil, and prefers full sun, although it will tolerate part shade. It is hardy to drought and frost-resistant to −7 °C (19 °F), and responds well to pruning. In cultivation it rarely reaches 2 metres (7 ft) high, and is short-lived. Propagation is by seed; seed takes around six weeks to germinate, with a germination success rate of about 70%.
