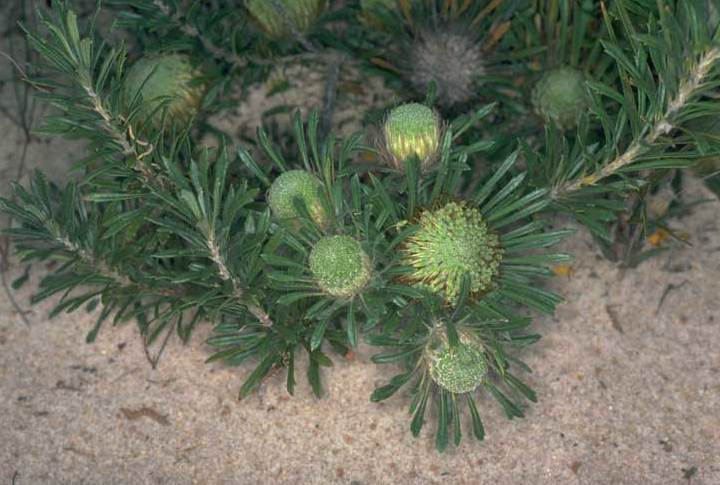
- Banksia tridentata near Cervantes

Scientific classification
- Kingdom: Plantae
- Clade: Tracheophytes
- Clade: Angiosperms
- Clade: Eudicots
- Order: Proteales
- Family: Proteaceae
- Genus: Banksia
- Subgenus: Banksia subg. Banksia
- Series: Banksia ser. Dryandra
- Species: B. tridentata

Binomial name
- Banksia tridentata (Meisn.) B.D.Jacks.

Synonyms
- Dryandra tridentata Meisn.; Josephia tridentata (Meisn.) Kuntze

= Banksia tridentata =

Yellow honeypot

Species of shrub endemic to Western Australia

Banksia tridentata, commonly known as yellow honeypot, is a low-growing shrub that is endemic to the southwest of Western Australia. It has narrow egg-shaped leaves with a sharp point on the tip, greenish yellow flowers in heads of between 85 and 125, and elliptical to egg-shaped follicles.

== Description ==
Banksia tridentata is a shrub that typically grows to a height of 15–50 cm (5.9–19.7 in) and forms a lignotuber. It has narrow egg-shaped leaves 15–45 mm (0.59–1.77 in) long and 2.5–5 mm (0.098–0.197 in) wide on a petiole 1–3 mm (0.039–0.118 in) long. There is a small sharp point on the tip and sometimes two or three small teeth near the tip of the leaf. The flowers are greenish yellow and arranged in heads of between 85 and 125 with hairy, linear, tapering involucral bracts up to 15 mm (0.59 in) long at the base of the head. The perianth is 25–28 mm (0.98–1.10 in) long and the pistil 30–40 mm (1.2–1.6 in) long. Flowering occurs from August to September and the fruit is a sparsely hairy, elliptical to egg-shaped follicle 11–15 mm (0.43–0.59 in) long.

== Taxonomy ==
This species was first formally described in 1856 by Carl Meissner who gave it the name Dryandra tridentata and published the description in Hooker's Journal of Botany and Kew Garden Miscellany.

In 1893 Benjamin Daydon Jackson accidentally listed it in Index Kewensis under Banksia, thus unwittingly publishing the name Banksia tridentata. This is now the current name for the species, as in 2007 all Dryandra species were transferred to Banksia by Austin Mast and Kevin Thiele.

== Distribution and habitat ==
Banksia tridentata grows in kwongan between the Arrowsmith and Hill Rivers.

== Ecology ==
An assessment of the potential impact of climate change on this species found that its range is unlikely to contract and may actually grow, depending on how effectively it migrates into newly habitable areas.

== Conservation status ==
This banksia is classified as "not threatened" by the Western Australian Government Department of Parks and Wildlife.
