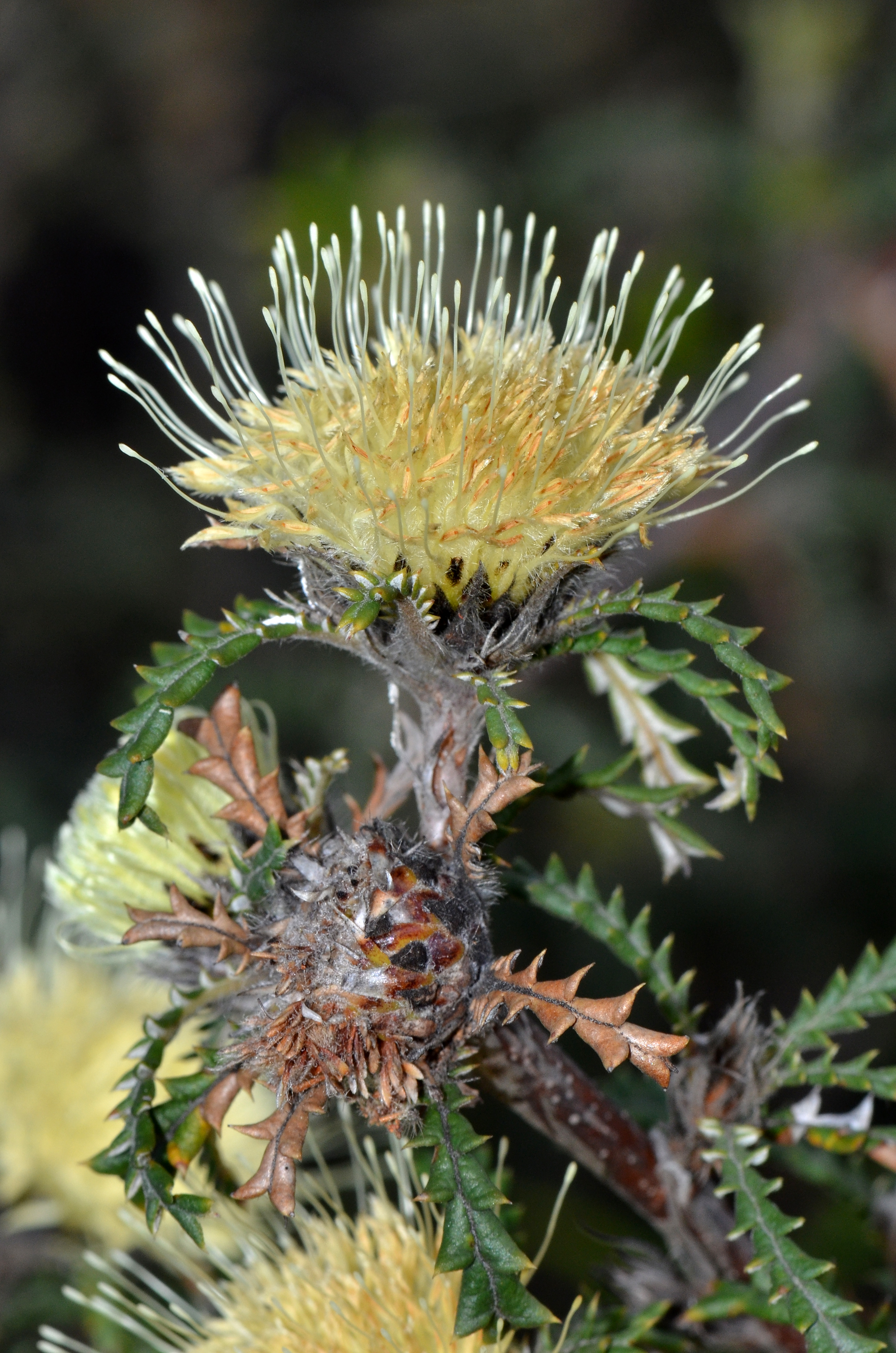

Scientific classification
- Kingdom: Plantae
- Clade: Tracheophytes
- Clade: Angiosperms
- Clade: Eudicots
- Order: Proteales
- Family: Proteaceae
- Genus: Banksia
- Subgenus: Banksia subg. Banksia
- Series: Banksia ser. Dryandra
- Species: B. kippistiana

Binomial name
- Banksia kippistiana (Meisn.) A.R.Mast & K.R.Thiele

Synonyms
- Dryandra kippistiana Meisn.; Josephia kippistiana (Meisn.) Kuntze

= Banksia kippistiana =

Shrub endemic to Western Australia

Banksia kippistiana is a species of shrub that is endemic to Western Australia. It has linear, pinnatifid leaves with ten to twenty lobes on each side, heads of up to eighty yellow and cream-coloured flowers, and elliptical follicles.

== Description ==
Banksia kippistiana is a shrub that typically grows to a height of 1.5 m (4 ft 11 in) and may or may not form a lignotuber, depending on the variety. It has stems that are woolly-hairy when young. The leaves are linear, pinnatifid, 40–80 mm (1.6–3.1 in) long and 4–6 mm (0.16–0.24 in) wide on a petiole 1–3 mm (0.039–0.118 in) long. There are between ten and twenty triangular lobes on each side of the leaves. The flowers are arranged in heads of between fifty and eighty on the ends of branchlets with hairy involucral bracts 10–20 mm (0.39–0.79 in) long at the base of the head. The flowers are fragrant and have a pale yellow perianth 12–20 mm (0.47–0.79 in) long and a cream-coloured pistil 19–26 mm (0.75–1.02 in) long. Flowering occurs from August to November and the follicles are elliptical, 4–5 mm (0.16–0.20 in) long and 7–8 mm (0.28–0.31 in) wide.

== Taxonomy and naming ==
This species was first formally described in 1856 by Carl Meissner who gave it the name Dryandra kippistiana and published the description in de Candolle's Prodromus Systematis Naturalis Regni Vegetabilis from specimens collected by James Drummond in the Swan River Colony. The specific epithet (kippistiana) commemorates Richard Kippist, librarian to the Linnean Society of London.

In 1996, Alex George described two varieties of the species in the journal Nuytsia:

- Banksia kippistiana var. kippistiana that does not form a lignotuber and has shorter flower parts and bracts than var. paenepeccata;
- Banksia kippistiana var. paenepeccata that forms a lignotuber and has a perianth 18–20 mm (0.71–0.79 in) long.

In 2007 Austin Mast and Kevin Thiele transferred all dryandras to the genus Banksia and renamed this species Banksia kippistiana. They also changed the genus names of the two varieties and the changes are accepted at the Australian Plant Census.

== Distribution and habitat ==
Banksia kippistiana grows in kwongan and occurs between Eneabba, Mount Lesueur and New Norcia, also in scattered locations to the south-eastern suburbs of Perth.

== Conservation status ==
Banksia kippistiana is classified as "not threatened" by the Western Australian Government Department of Parks and Wildlife, but var. paenepeccata is classified as "Priority Three" meaning that it is poorly known and known from only a few locations but is not under imminent threat.
