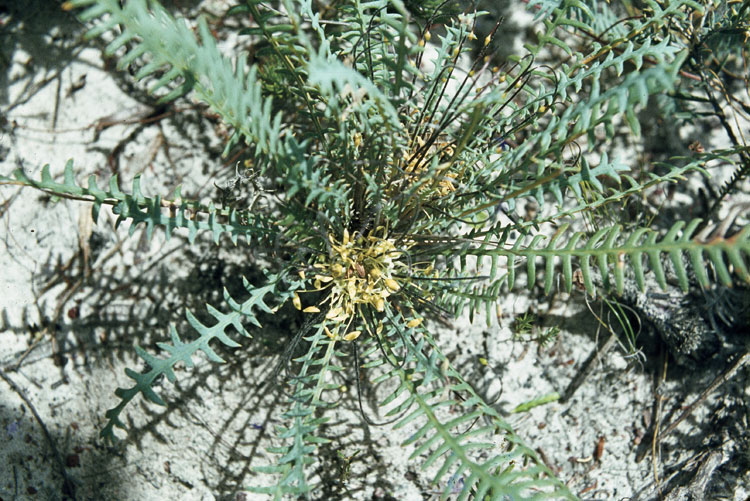

Conservation status
- Priority Three — Poorly Known Taxa (DEC)

Scientific classification
- Kingdom: Plantae
- Clade: Tracheophytes
- Clade: Angiosperms
- Clade: Eudicots
- Order: Proteales
- Family: Proteaceae
- Genus: Banksia
- Subgenus: Banksia subg. Banksia
- Series: Banksia ser. Dryandra
- Species: B. nana

Binomial name
- Banksia nana (Meisn.) A.R.Mast & K.R.Thiele

Synonyms
- Dryandra nana Meisn.; Josephia nana (Meisn.) Kuntze

= Banksia nana =

Dwarf dryandra

Species of shrub in Western Australia

Banksia nana, commonly known as dwarf dryandra, is a species of shrub that is endemic to a small area in the south-west of Western Australia. It has underground stems, pinnatipartite leaves with sharply-pointed lobes, pale green or yellow flowers and broadly egg-shaped follicles.

== Description ==
Banksia nana is a shrub with short, hairy, underground stems and a small lignotuber. The leaves are pinnatipartite, 40–190 mm (1.6–7.5 in) long and 10–24 mm (0.39–0.94 in) wide on a petiole up to 10 mm (0.39 in) long. There are between ten and thirty-five sharply-pointed lobes on each side of the leaves. Between twelve and seventeen pale green or yellow flowers are arranged in a head on the ends of branches, with egg-shaped to lance-shaped involucral bracts up to 10 mm (0.39 in) long at the base of the head. The perianth is 33–34 mm (1.3–1.3 in) long and the pistil 68–79 mm (2.7–3.1 in) long and curved. Flowering occurs in October and the follicles are broadly egg-shaped, 13–14 mm (0.51–0.55 in) long.

== Taxonomy and naming ==
This species was first formally described in 1855 by Carl Meissner who gave it the name Dryandra nana and published the description in Hooker's Journal of Botany and Kew Garden Miscellany from specimens collected by James Drummond. The specific epithet (nana) is a Latin word meaning "dwarf". In 2007 Austin Mast and Kevin Thiele transferred all dryandras to the genus Banksia and renamed this species Banksia nana.

== Distribution and habitat ==
Banksia nana grows in kwongan on low hills near Badgingarra in the Geraldton Sandplains and Swan Coastal Plain biogeographic regions.

== Conservation status ==
This banksia is classified as "Priority Three" by the Government of Western Australia Department of Parks and Wildlife, meaning that it is poorly known and known from only a few locations but is not under imminent threat.
