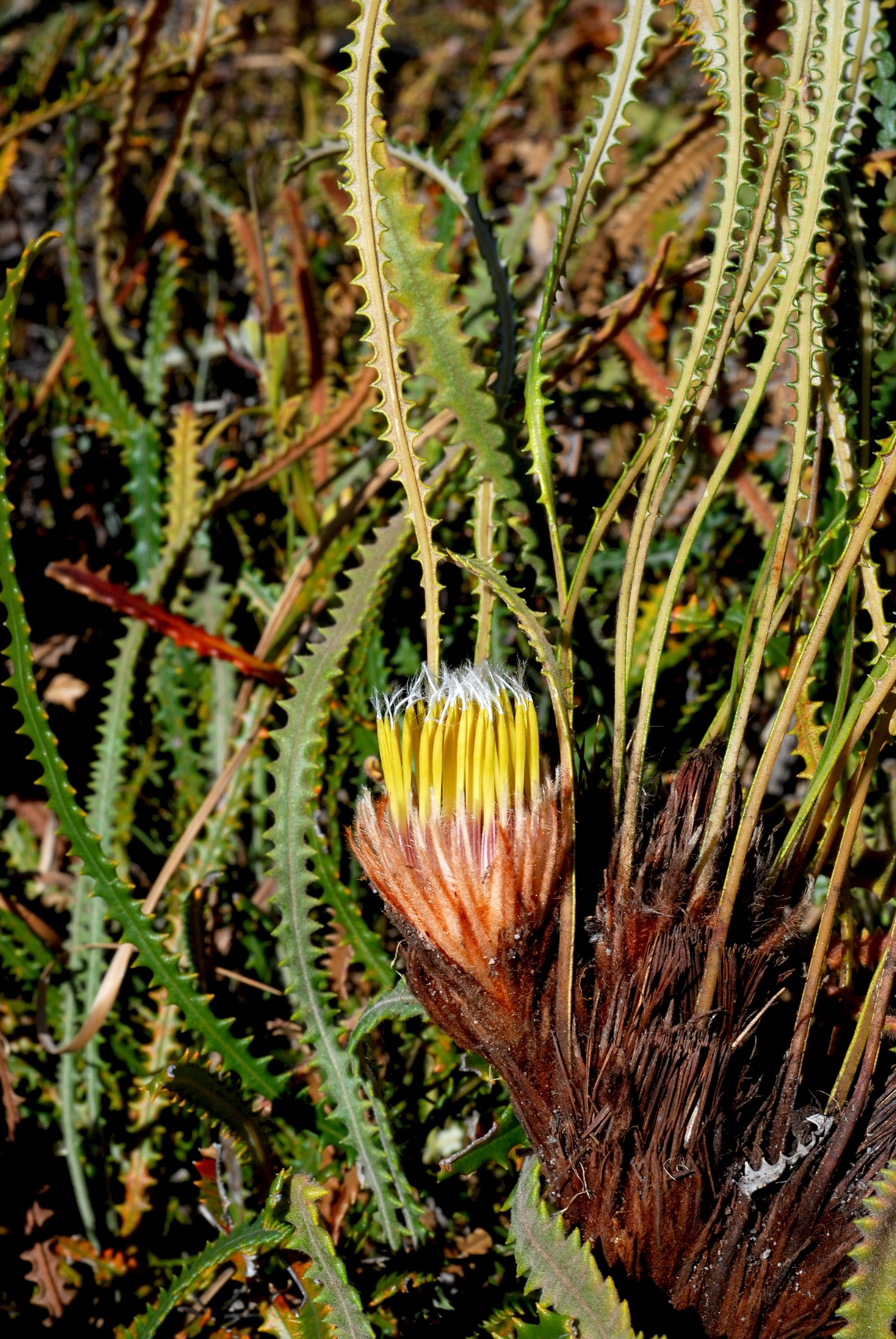

Conservation status
- Endangered (EPBC Act)

- Endangered (IUCN 3.1)

Scientific classification
- Kingdom: Plantae
- Clade: Tracheophytes
- Clade: Angiosperms
- Clade: Eudicots
- Order: Proteales
- Family: Proteaceae
- Genus: Banksia
- Subgenus: Banksia subg. Banksia
- Series: Banksia ser. Dryandra
- Species: B. mimica

Binomial name
- Banksia mimica (A.S.George) A.R.Mast & K.R.Thiele

Synonyms
- Dryandra mimica A.S.George

= Banksia mimica =

Summer honeypot

Species of shrub in Western Australia

Banksia mimica, commonly known as summer honeypot, is a species of prostrate shrub that is endemic to Western Australia. It has wedge-shaped leaves with sharply-pointed teeth on the sides, yellow flowers in heads of up to fifty and oblong, hairy follicles.

== Description ==
Banksia mimica is a prostrate shrub with short, linear, underground stems and a small lignotuber. The leaves are wedge-shaped, 130–350 mm (5.1–13.8 in) long and 5–15 mm (0.20–0.59 in) wide on a petiole 40–60 mm (1.6–2.4 in) long. There are between twenty and sixty sharply-pointed teeth on each side of the leaves. The leaves are densely hairy on the lower surface where there is a prominent mid-vein. The flowers are yellow and arranged near ground level in groups of between twenty and fifty in each head, with tapering, hairy involucral bracts 17–23 mm (0.67–0.91 in) long at the base of the head. The perianth is 25–30 mm (0.98–1.18 in) long and hairy, the pistil 24–27 mm (0.94–1.06 in) long and glabrous. Flowering occurs from December or January to February and the follicles are 13–20 mm (0.51–0.79 in) long and 8–10 mm (0.31–0.39 in) wide with flattened hairs.

== Taxonomy and naming ==
Summer honeypot was first formally described in 1985 by Alex George in the journal Nuytsia and given the name Dryandra mimica from specimens he collected in the Perth suburb Wattle Grove. The specific epithet (mimica) is from a Latin word meaning "imitative", referring to this species' superficial resemblance to Dryandra nivea (now Banksia nivea).

In 2007, Austin Mast and Kevin Thiele transferred all the dryandras to the genus Banksia and this species became Banksia mimica.

== Distribution and habitat ==
Banksia mimica occurs in three disjunct populations near Mogumber, on the Darling Range east of Perth, and in the Whicher Range near Busselton. It grows in woodland, shrubland or low heath.

== Conservation status ==
This banksia is classified as "endangered" under the Australian Government Environment Protection and Biodiversity Conservation Act 1999 and as "Threatened Flora (Declared Rare Flora — Extant)" by the Department of Environment and Conservation (Western Australia). The main threats to the species are land clearing for agriculture and for urban development.
