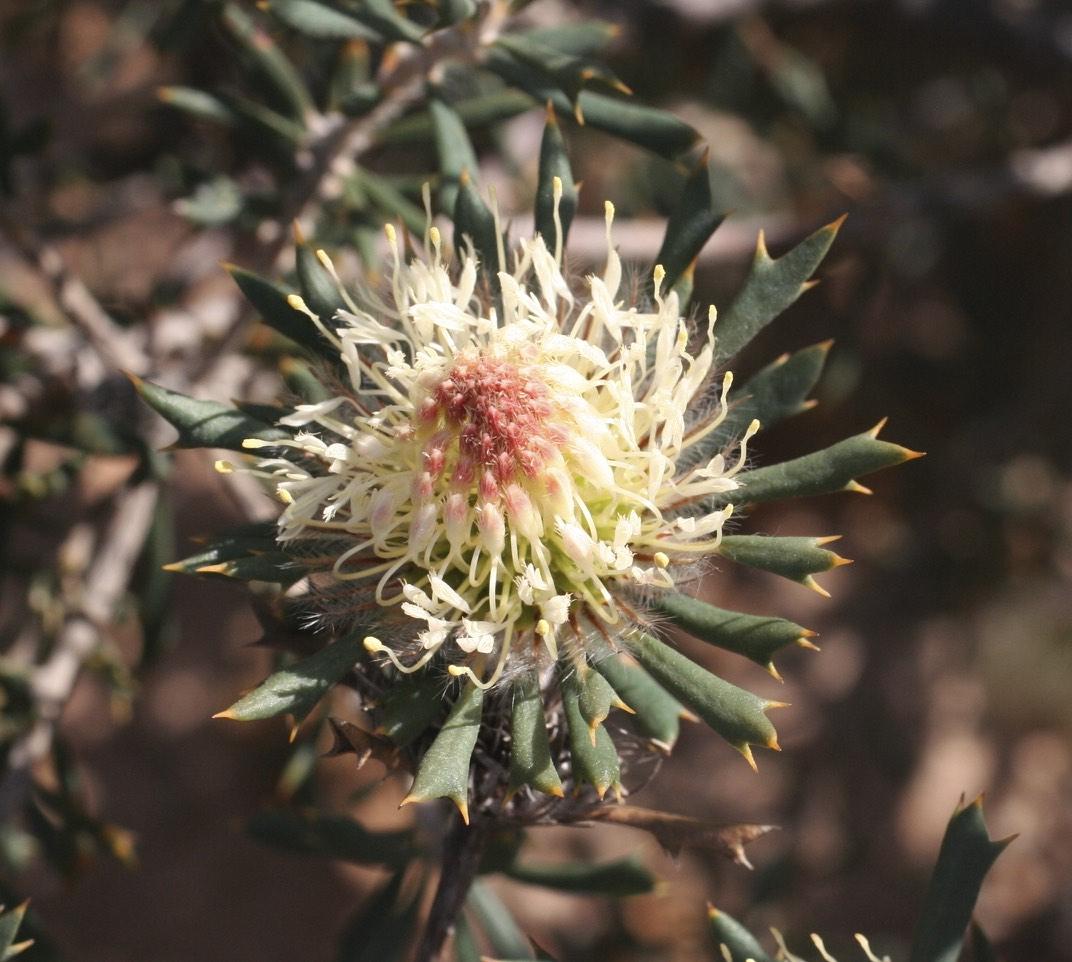
- Banksia carlinoides near Hill River

Scientific classification
- Kingdom: Plantae
- Clade: Tracheophytes
- Clade: Angiosperms
- Clade: Eudicots
- Order: Proteales
- Family: Proteaceae
- Genus: Banksia
- Subgenus: Banksia subg. Banksia
- Series: Banksia ser. Dryandra
- Species: B. carlinoides

Binomial name
- Banksia carlinoides (Meisn.) A.R.Mast & K.R.Thiele

Synonyms
- Dryandra carlinoides Meisn.; Josephia carlinodes Kuntze orth. var.; Josephia carlinoides (Meisn.) Kuntze

= Banksia carlinoides =

Pink dryandra

Species of shrub native to Australia

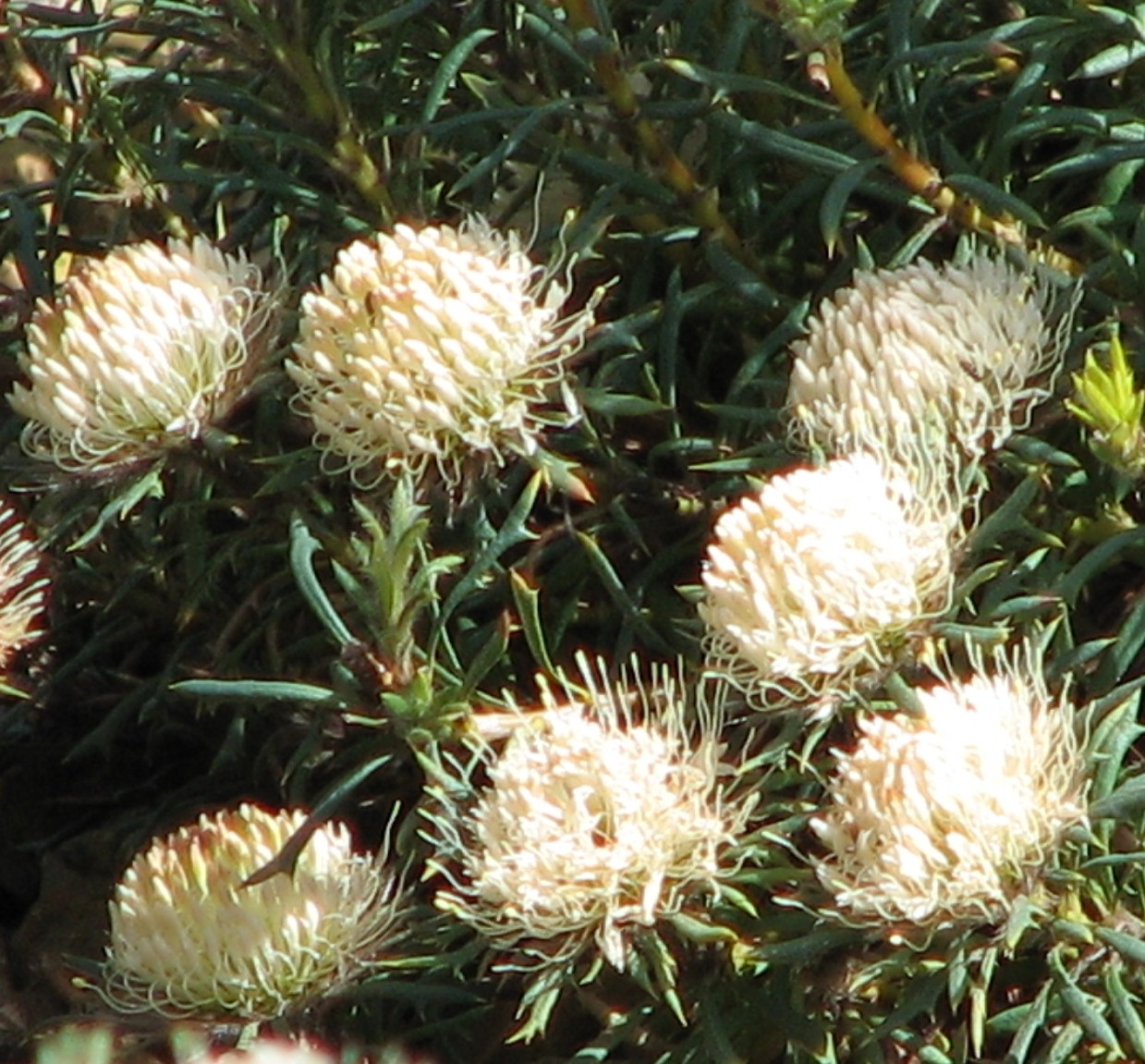
In the Royal Botanic Gardens, Cranbourne

Banksia carlinoides, commonly known as the pink dryandra, is a species of shrub that is endemic to Western Australia. It has narrow egg-shaped to wedge-shaped leaves with a few sharply pointed serrations and heads of up to one hundred creamy white flowers, often tinged pink.

== Description ==
Banksia carlinoides is a rounded, compact shrub that typically grows to a height of 1.3 m (4 ft 3 in) but does not form a lignotuber. It has narrow egg-shaped to narrow wedge-shaped leaves with the narrower end towards the base, 110–35 mm (4.3–1.4 in) long and 3–9 mm (0.12–0.35 in) wide on a petiole 1–2 mm (0.039–0.079 in) long. There are up to four sharply pointed teeth up to 3 mm (0.12 in) long on each side of the upper third of the leaf. The flowers are arranged in heads of between seventy-five and one hundred on the ends of the stems, surrounded by involucral bracts up to 13 mm (0.51 in) long. The flowers are creamy white, often tinged with pink, the perianth 10–20 mm (0.39–0.79 in) long and the pistil 16–23 mm (0.63–0.91 in) long. Flowering occurs from September to October and the fruit is an elliptical to egg-shaped follicle 8–11 mm (0.31–0.43 in) long.

== Taxonomy and naming ==
This species was first formally described in 1848 by Carl Meissner who gave it the name Dryandra carlinoides and published the description in Lehmann's Plantae Preissianae. The specific epithet (carlinoides) is a reference to a perceived similarity to plants in the genus Carlina. In 2007 Austin Mast and Kevin Thiele transferred all dryandras to the genus Banksia.

== Distribution and habitat ==
Pink dryandra grows in low kwongan and is widespread between Geraldton, Gingin and Piawaning.
