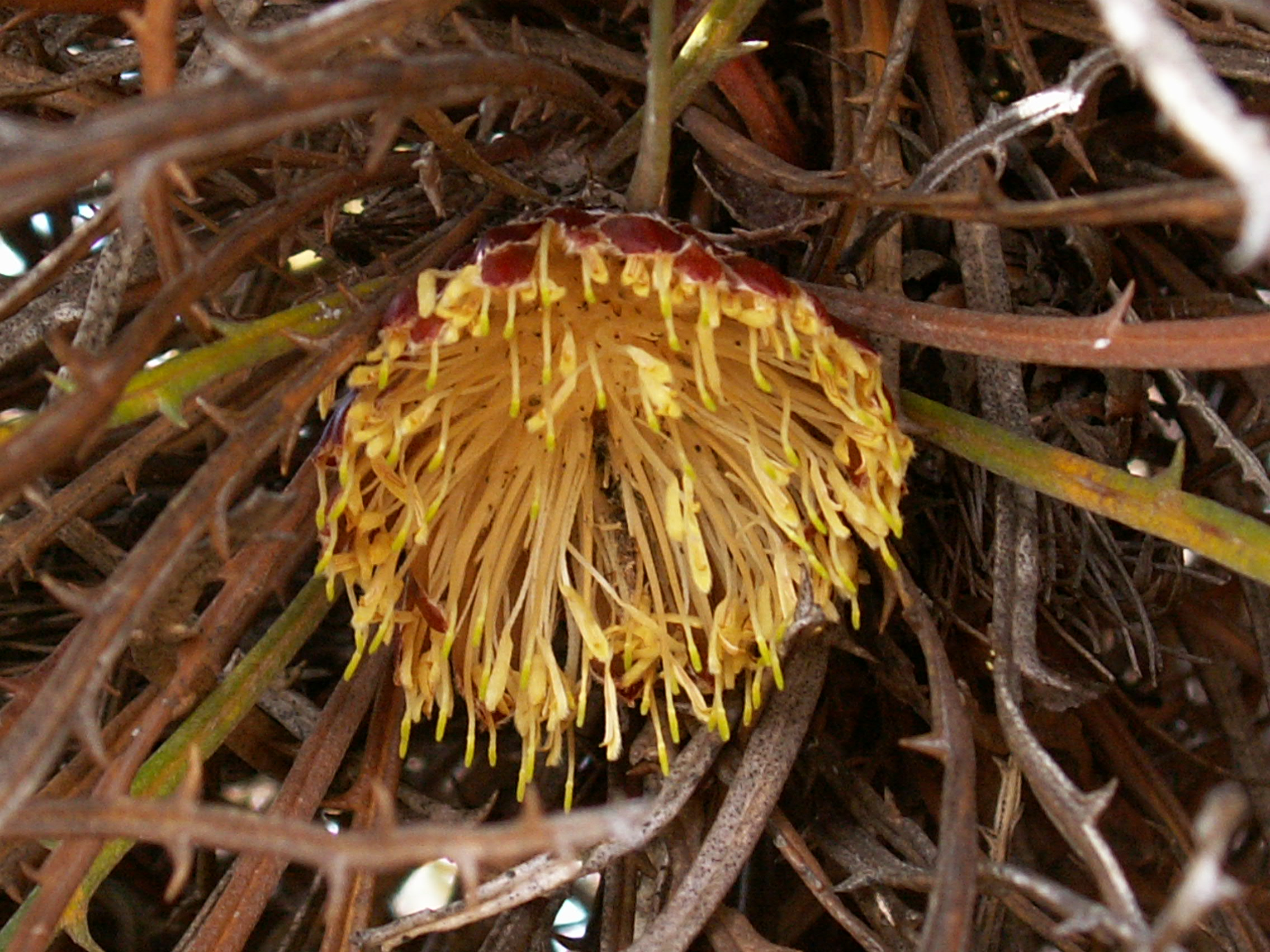

Conservation status
- Priority Four — Rare Taxa (DEC)

Scientific classification
- Kingdom: Plantae
- Clade: Tracheophytes
- Clade: Angiosperms
- Clade: Eudicots
- Order: Proteales
- Family: Proteaceae
- Genus: Banksia
- Subgenus: Banksia subg. Banksia
- Series: Banksia ser. Dryandra
- Species: B. comosa

Binomial name
- Banksia comosa (Meisn.) A.R.Mast & K.R.Thiele

Synonyms
- Dryandra comosa Meisn.; Josephia comosa (Meisn.) Kuntze

= Banksia comosa =

Wongan dryandra

Species of shrub endemic to Western Australia

Banksia comosa, commonly known as Wongan dryandra, is a species of shrub that is endemic to Western Australia. It has linear leaves with widely spaced, sharply pointed serrations, heads of yellow flowers and glabrous fruit.

== Description ==
Banksia comosa is a dense, bushy shrub that typically grows to a height of 3 m (9.8 ft) but does not form a lignotuber. It has linear, often bent leaves that are 10–35 cm (3.9–13.8 in) long and 4–8 mm (0.16–0.31 in) wide on a petiole up to 20 mm (0.79 in) long. Each side of the leaf has between eight and fifteen well-shaped, sharply pointed, narrow triangular teeth. The flowers are borne in heads of 110 to 150, the heads surrounded by dark reddish brown involucral bracts that are up to 35 mm (1.4 in) long. The flowers have a yellow perianth 25–27 mm (0.98–1.06 in) long and a pistil 27–29 mm (1.1–1.1 in) long. Flowering occurs from August to October and the fruit is a broadly egg-shaped, more or less glabrous follicle 11–15 mm (0.43–0.59 in) long.

== Taxonomy and naming ==
This species was first formally described in 1848 by Carl Meissner who gave it the name Dryandra carlinoides and published the description in de Candolle's Prodromus Systematis Naturalis Regni Vegetabilis from specimens collected by James Drummond. The specific epithet (comosa) is a Latin word meaning "having tufts of hairs or of leaves". In 2007 Austin Mast and Kevin Thiele transferred all dryandras to the genus Banksia and renamed this species Banksia comosa.

== Distribution and habitat ==
Wongan dryandra grows in kwongan and is only known from Wongan Hills.

== Conservation status ==
This banksia is classified as "Priority Four" by the Government of Western Australia Department of Parks and Wildlife, meaning that is rare or near threatened.
