= Alexander Morrison National Park =

National park in Western Australia

- IUCN category II (national park)
- Location within Western Australia
- Location: Western Australia
- Nearest city: Coorow
- Coordinates: 30°05′02″S 115°29′10″E
- Area: 85 km^{2} (33 sq mi)
- Established: 1970
- Governing body: Parks and Wildlife Service
- Website: https://parks.dpaw.wa.gov.au/park/alexander-morrison

Alexander Morrison National Park is a national park in Western Australia, located 207 kilometres (129 mi) north of Perth in the Shire of Coorow along the Green Head-Coorow Road. It was named for Alexander Morrison, the first Government Botanist of Western Australia.

== Description ==
The 8,500 hectares (21,004 acres) park contains sandplains and low lateritic breakaways over sandstones and shales of the Lower Jurassic Cockleshell Gully Formation. Sand heaths are the dominant vegetation, but the park also contains extensive stands of low woodland and mallee typical of the area, especially in the western parts of the park. Prominent eucalypt species in the area are Powder-barked Wandoo (Eucalyptus accedens) and Mallalie (E. eudesmoides), while the heaths are rich in species typical of the region and include rare species such as spiral bush (Spirogardnera rubescens). The northern variant of Banksia vestita is also common.

== History ==
Land for the national park was set aside by the Department of Lands and Surveys under Reserves ↑26800, ↑26803 and ↑26804 on 23 May 1969, and over 1970 and 1971, the land was classified as an "A" Class reserve, meaning its purpose could not be changed except by an Act of Parliament, and vested in the National Parks Authority of Western Australia. The park was officially named on 8 October 1971.

The Environmental Protection Authority recommended in 1974 that a one-kilometre-wide strip of vacant Crown land on the south side of Green Head-Coorow Road be added to the reserve – however, this was not actioned.

== See also ==
- List of protected areas of Western Australia
- List of national parks of Australia
