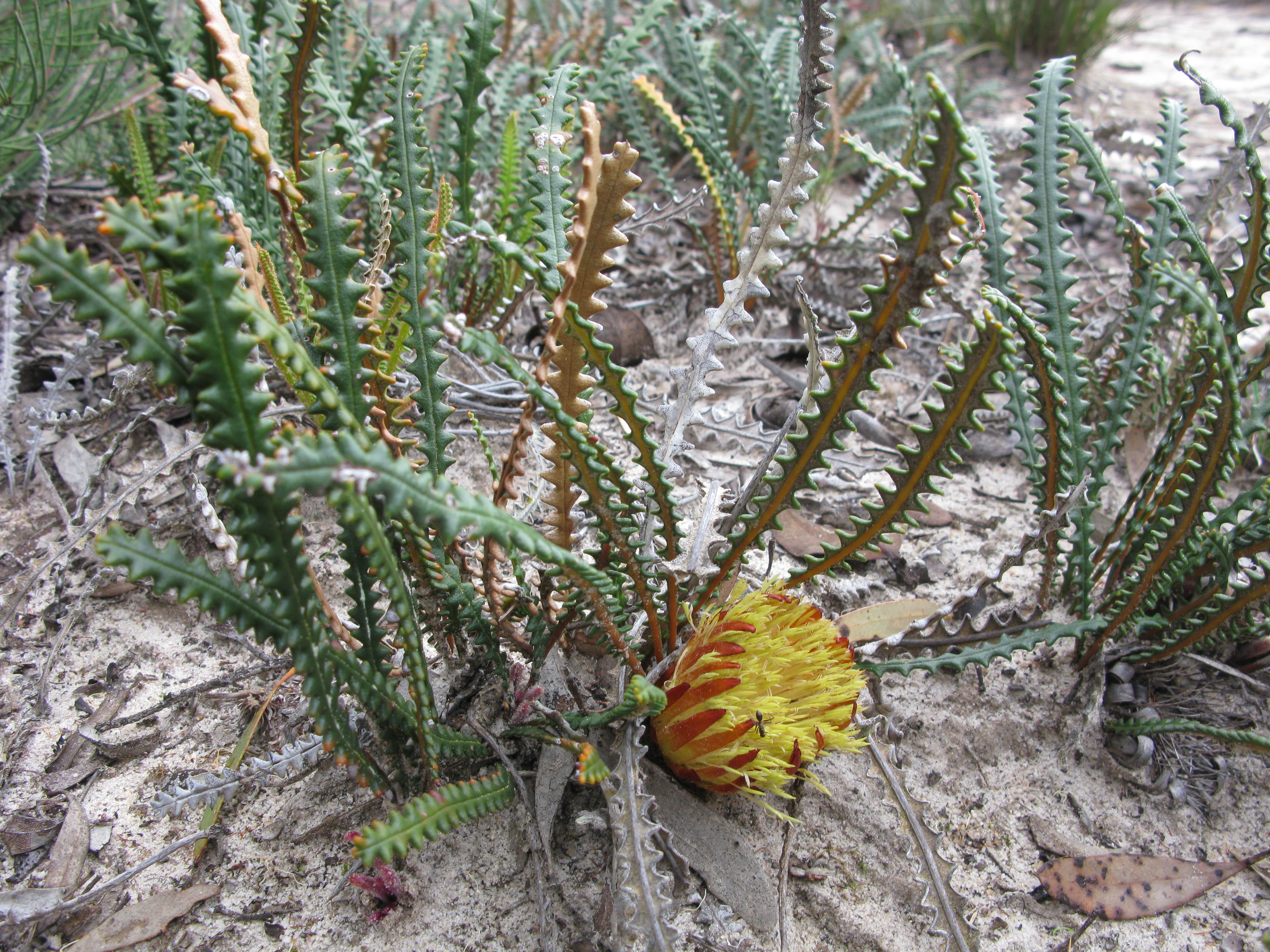

Scientific classification
- Kingdom: Plantae
- Clade: Tracheophytes
- Clade: Angiosperms
- Clade: Eudicots
- Order: Proteales
- Family: Proteaceae
- Genus: Banksia
- Subgenus: Banksia subg. Banksia
- Series: Banksia ser. Dryandra
- Species: B. obtusa

Binomial name
- Banksia obtusa (R.Br.) A.R.Mast & K.R.Thiele

Synonyms
- Dryandra multiserialis F.Muell.; Dryandra obtusa R.Br.; Josephia obtusa (R.Br.) Kuntze isonym

= Banksia obtusa =

Shining honeypot

Species of shrub endemic to Western Australia

Banksia obtusa, commonly known as shining honeypot, is a species of shrub that is endemic to the south-west of Western Australia. It has underground stems, linear pinnatifid leaves with triangular lobes on each side, cream-coloured to yellow flowers in heads of up to seventy, surrounded by dark reddish bracts and egg-shaped follicles.

== Description ==
Banksia obtusa is a shrub with triangular, underground stems but does not form a lignotuber. The leaves appear in tufts up to 60 cm (24 in) in diameter and are linear in shape and pinnatifid, 150–300 mm (5.9–11.8 in) long and 6–17 mm (0.24–0.67 in) wide on a petiole 20–40 mm (0.79–1.57 in) long. There are between thirty and sixty triangular lobes on each side of the leaves. Between fifty-five and seventy cream-coloured or yellow flowers are borne in a head with oblong to egg-shaped, dark reddish-brown involucral bracts up to 45 mm (1.8 in) long at the base of the head. The perianth is 26–30 mm (1.0–1.2 in) long and the pistil 35–38 mm (1.4–1.5 in) long. Flowering occurs from August to November, and the follicles are egg-shaped and about 18 mm (0.71 in) long.

== Taxonomy and naming ==
This species was first formally described in 1810 by Robert Brown who gave it the name Dryandra obtusa and published the description in Transactions of the Linnean Society of London. The specific epithet (obtusa) is from a Latin word meaning "blunt", referring either to the leaves or the leaf lobes.

In 2007 Austin Mast and Kevin Thiele transferred all dryandras to the genus Banksia and renamed this species Banksia obtusa.

== Distribution and habitat ==
Shining honeypot grows in kwongan and mallee shrubland in near-coastal areas between the Fitzgerald River National Park and the Cape Arid National Park.

== Conservation status ==
This banksia is classified as "not threatened" by the Western Australian Government Department of Parks and Wildlife.
