= Banksia foliolata =

Conservation status
- Priority Four — Rare Taxa (DEC)

Scientific classification
- Kingdom: Plantae
- Clade: Tracheophytes
- Clade: Angiosperms
- Clade: Eudicots
- Order: Proteales
- Family: Proteaceae
- Genus: Banksia
- Subgenus: Banksia subg. Banksia
- Series: Banksia ser. Dryandra
- Species: B. foliolata

Binomial name
- Banksia foliolata (R.Br.) A.R.Mast & K.R.Thiele

Synonyms
- Dryandra foliolata R.Br.; Dryandra mutica Meisn. nom. inval., nom. nud.; Dryandra mutica Meisn.; Josephia foliolata (R.Br.) Kuntze; Josephia mutica (Meisn.) Kuntze

Species of shrub endemic to Western Australia

Banksia foliolata is a species of shrub that is endemic to Western Australia. It has hairy stems, pinnatifid leaves, heads of about sixty cream-coloured and maroon flowers and oblong to elliptical follicles. It grows on rocky slopes in dense shrubland in the Stirling Range National Park.

== Description ==
Banksia foliolata is a shrub that typically grows to a height of 1–3 m (3 ft 3 in – 9 ft 10 in) but does not form a lignotuber. It has hairy stems and pinnatifid leaves that are oblong in outline, 60–200 mm (2.4–7.9 in) long and 10–20 mm (0.39–0.79 in) wide on a petiole 5–40 mm (0.20–1.57 in) long. There are between ten and thirty-five egg-shaped lobes on each side of the leaves. The flowers are borne on a head containing between fifty and sixty flowers. There are egg-shaped to lance-shaped involucral bracts up to 13 mm (0.51 in) long at the base of the head. The flowers have a cream-coloured perianth up to 17 mm (0.67 in) long and a pistil 20–24 mm (0.79–0.94 in) long and maroon in the upper half. Flowering occurs from October to November and the follicles are oblong to elliptical, 11–14 mm (0.43–0.55 in) long and hairy only in the upper half.

== Taxonomy and naming ==
This banksia was first formally described in 1830 by Robert Brown who gave it the name Dryandra foliolata and published the description in Supplementum primum Prodromi florae Novae Hollandiae from specimens collected by William Baxter near King George's Sound in 1829. In 2007, Austin Mast and Kevin Thiele changed the name to Banksia foliolata. The specific epithet (foliolata) from a Latin word meaning "leaved" or "leafy".

== Distribution and habitat ==
Banksia foliolata grows on rocky slopes in dense shrubland in the Stirling Range National Park.

== Conservation status ==
This banksia is classified as "Priority Four" by the Government of Western Australia Department of Parks and Wildlife, meaning that is rare or near threatened.
