= Banksia brunnea =

Scientific classification
- Kingdom: Plantae
- Clade: Tracheophytes
- Clade: Angiosperms
- Clade: Eudicots
- Order: Proteales
- Family: Proteaceae
- Genus: Banksia
- Subgenus: Banksia subg. Banksia
- Series: Banksia ser. Dryandra
- Species: B. brunnea

Binomial name
- Banksia brunnea A.R.Mast & K.R.Thiele

Synonyms
- Dryandra brownii Meisn.; Dryandra arctotidis auct. non R.Br.

Species of shrub endemic to Western Australia

Banksia brunnea is a species of low, bushy shrub that is endemic to the south-west of Western Australia. It has dark green pinnatisect leaves, heads of up to seventy pink and brownish flowers and glabrous follicles in the fruiting head.

== Description ==
Banksia brunnea is a bushy, much-branched shrub that typically grows to a height of 0.7 m (2 ft 4 in) but does not form a lignotuber. Its leaves are dark green, 150–350 mm (5.9–13.8 in) long, 10–16 mm (0.39–0.63 in) wide on a petiole 15–30 mm (0.59–1.18 in) long and pinnatisect with between forty and seventy-five lobes on each side with V-shaped spaces between the lobes. The flowers are arranged in heads of between fifty-five and seventy flowers, each flower with a pink perianth 28–39 mm (1.1–1.5 in) long and a deep red pistil 41–54 mm (1.6–2.1 in) long. Flowering occurs in August and the fruit is a mostly glabrous, egg-shaped follicle 12–14 mm (0.47–0.55 in) long.

== Taxonomy and naming ==
This banksia was first formally described in 1845 by Carl Meissner who gave it the name Dryandra brownii and published the description in Lehmann's Plantae Preissianae. In 2007 Austin Mast and Kevin Thiele transferred all the dryandras to the genus Banksia but as there was already a plant named Banksia brownii, Mast and Thiele chose the specific epithet "brunnea". The specific epithet is from a Latin word meaning "brown".

== Distribution and habitat ==
Banksia brunnea grows in kwongan between Albany, the Stirling Range and the Fitzgerald River National Park.

== Conservation status ==
This species is classified as "not threatened" by the Western Australian Government Department of Parks and Wildlife.

== Ecology ==
An assessment of the potential impact of climate change on this species found that its range is likely to contract by between 30% and 80% by 2080, depending on the severity of the change.
