= Banksia seneciifolia =

Conservation status
- Priority Four — Rare Taxa (DEC)

Scientific classification
- Kingdom: Plantae
- Clade: Tracheophytes
- Clade: Angiosperms
- Clade: Eudicots
- Order: Proteales
- Family: Proteaceae
- Genus: Banksia
- Subgenus: Banksia subg. Banksia
- Series: Banksia ser. Dryandra
- Species: B. seneciifolia

Binomial name
- Banksia seneciifolia (R.Br.) A.R.Mast & K.R.Thiele

Synonyms
- Dryandra cryptocephala Meisn.; Dryandra seneciifolia R.Br.; Dryandra senecionifolia F.Muell. orth. var.; Josephia seneciifolia (R.Br.) Kuntze; Josephia senocionifolia Kuntze orth. var.

Species of shrub endemic to Western Australia

Banksia seneciifolia is a species of column-shaped shrub that is endemic to the south-west of Western Australia. It has linear, pinnatifid leaves, yellow flowers in heads of about twenty-five, and narrow egg-shaped follicles.

== Description ==
Banksia seneciifolia is a column-shaped shrub that grows to a height of 0.6–1.0 m (2 ft 0 in – 3 ft 3 in) but does not form a lignotuber. It has linear, pinnatifid leaves 30–50 mm (1.2–2.0 in) long and 5–15 mm (0.20–0.59 in) wide on a petiole up to 15 mm (0.59 in) long. There are between two and five linear lobes up to 9 mm (0.35 in) long on each side of the leaves. About twenty-five yellow flowers are arranged in heads surrounded by linear, tapering, hairy involucral bracts up to 17 mm (0.67 in) long at the base of each head. The perianth is 12–14 mm (0.47–0.55 in) long and curved downwards, and the pistil is 17–19 mm (0.67–0.75 in) long and also curved downwards. Flowering occurs from July to August. A single, narrow egg-shaped follicle 7–9 mm (0.28–0.35 in) long forms in each head.

== Taxonomy and naming ==
This species was first formally described in 1830 by Robert Brown who gave it the name Dryandra seneciifolia and published the description in the Supplementum primum Prodromi florae Novae Hollandiae from specimens collected by William Baxter near King George's Sound in 1829. The specific epithet (seneciifolia) refers to the genus Senecio with the ending -folia from the Latin -folius meaning "-leaved".

In 2007, Austin Mast and Kevin Thiele transferred all the dryandras to the genus Banksia and this species became Banksia seneciifolia.

== Distribution and habitat ==
Banksia seneciifolia grows in mallee-kwongan in the Stirling Range National Park but there are record from before 1900 as far south as Albany.

== Conservation status ==
This banksia is classified as "Priority Four" by the Government of Western Australia Department of Parks and Wildlife, meaning that is rare or near threatened.
