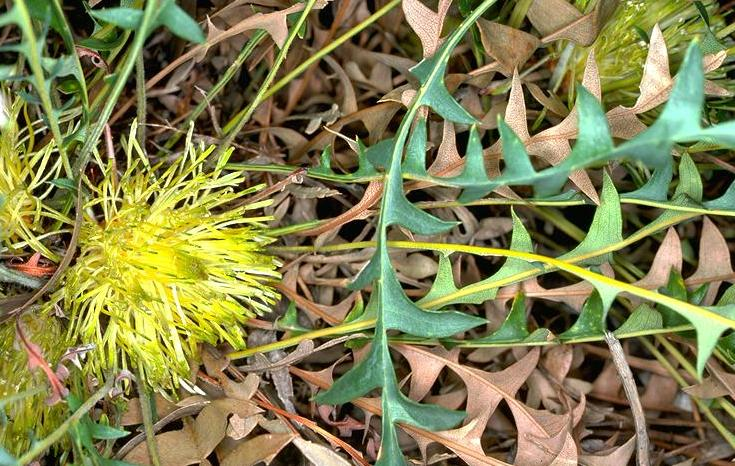
- In the ANBG

Scientific classification
- Kingdom: Plantae
- Clade: Tracheophytes
- Clade: Angiosperms
- Clade: Eudicots
- Order: Proteales
- Family: Proteaceae
- Genus: Banksia
- Subgenus: Banksia subg. Banksia
- Series: Banksia ser. Dryandra
- Species: B. octotriginta

Binomial name
- Banksia octotriginta (A.S.George) A.R.Mast & K.R.Thiele

Synonyms
- Dryandra octotriginta A.S.George

= Banksia octotriginta =

Species of shrub endemic to Western Australia

Banksia octotriginta is a species of shrub that is endemic to the south-west of Western Australia. It has erect stems with bluish-green, deeply pinnatipartite leaves, heads of up to eighty or more golden-yellow flowers and egg-shaped follicles.

== Description ==
Banksia octotriginta is a shrub with erect stems that typically grows to a height of 0.25–1 m (9.8 in – 3 ft 3.4 in) but does not form a lignotuber. It has bluish-green, deeply pinnatipartite leaves divided almost to the midrib, 100–250 mm (3.9–9.8 in) long and 30–60 mm (1.2–2.4 in) wide on a petiole 30–60 mm (1.2–2.4 in) long, with between ten and eighteen triangular lobes on each side. The flowers are pale golden-yellow and arranged in a head on the ends of branches in groups of between fifty and eighty-five, with linear, leaf-like involucral bracts 10–20 mm (0.39–0.79 in) long covered with rust-coloured, at the base of the head. The perianth is 35–43 mm (1.4–1.7 in) long and the pistil 40–48 mm (1.6–1.9 in) long and glabrous. Flowering occurs from July to August and the follicles are egg-shaped, about 13 mm (0.51 in) long, 12 mm (0.47 in) wide and sparsely hairy.

== Taxonomy and naming ==
This species was first formally described in 1996 by Alex George in the journal Nuytsia and given the name Dryandra octotriginta from specimens he collected near Nyabing in 1986. The specific epithet (octotriginta) is a Latin word meaning "thirty-eight", referring to number given to the species in a list of new species prepared by a Dryandra Study Group.

In 2007, Austin Mast and Kevin Thiele transferred all the dryandras to the genus Banksia and this species became Banksia octotriginta.

== Distribution and habitat ==
Banksia octotriginta grows in kwongan, often with mallee eucalypts and occurs between Woodanilling, Nyabing, Newdegate and Dragon Rocks.

== Ecology ==
An assessment of the potential impact of climate change on this species found that it was likely to be driven to extinction by loss of habitat by 2080, even under mild climate change scenarios.

== Conservation status ==
Banksia octotriginta is classified as "not threatened" by the Western Australian Government Department of Parks and Wildlife.
