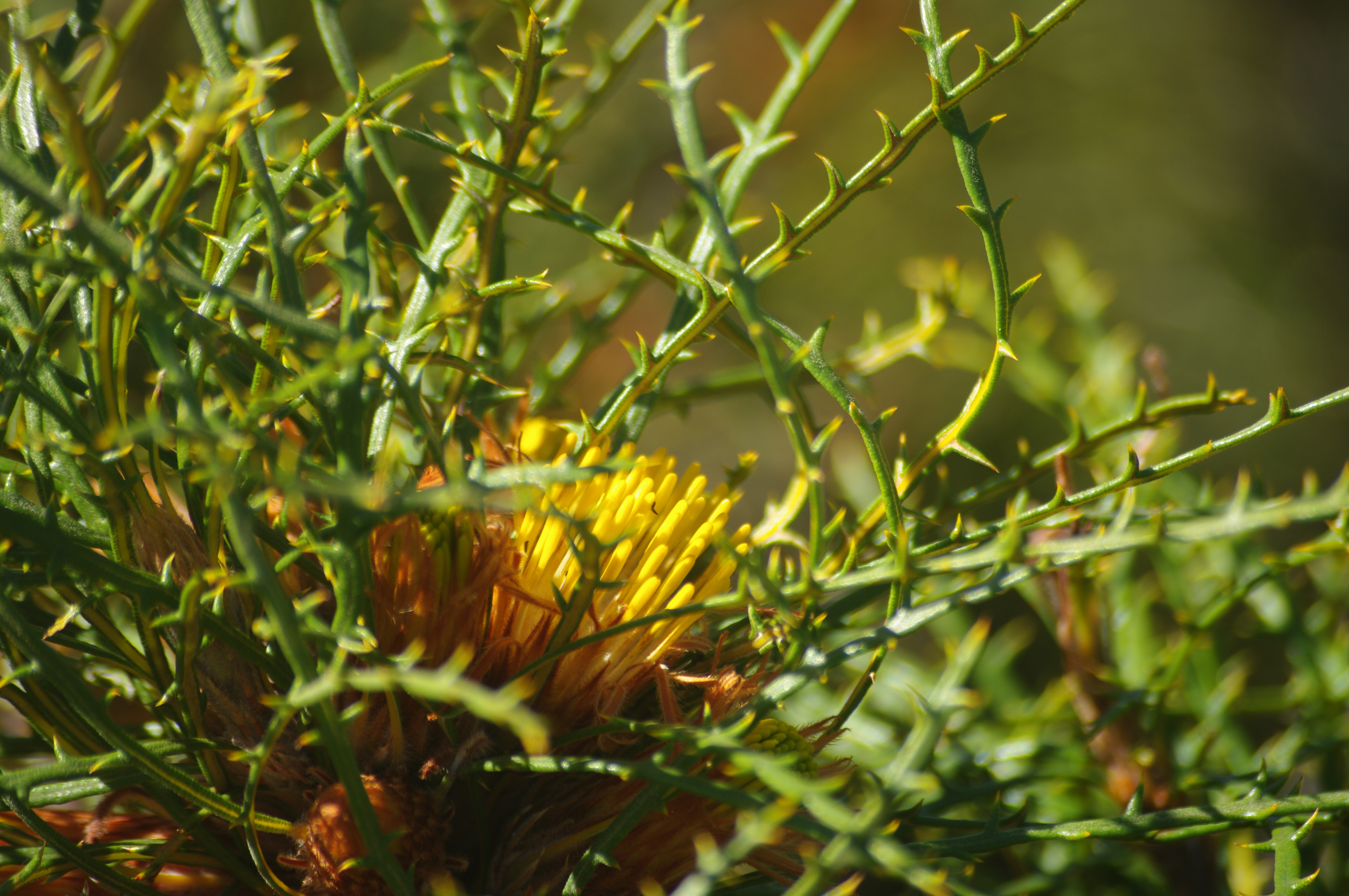

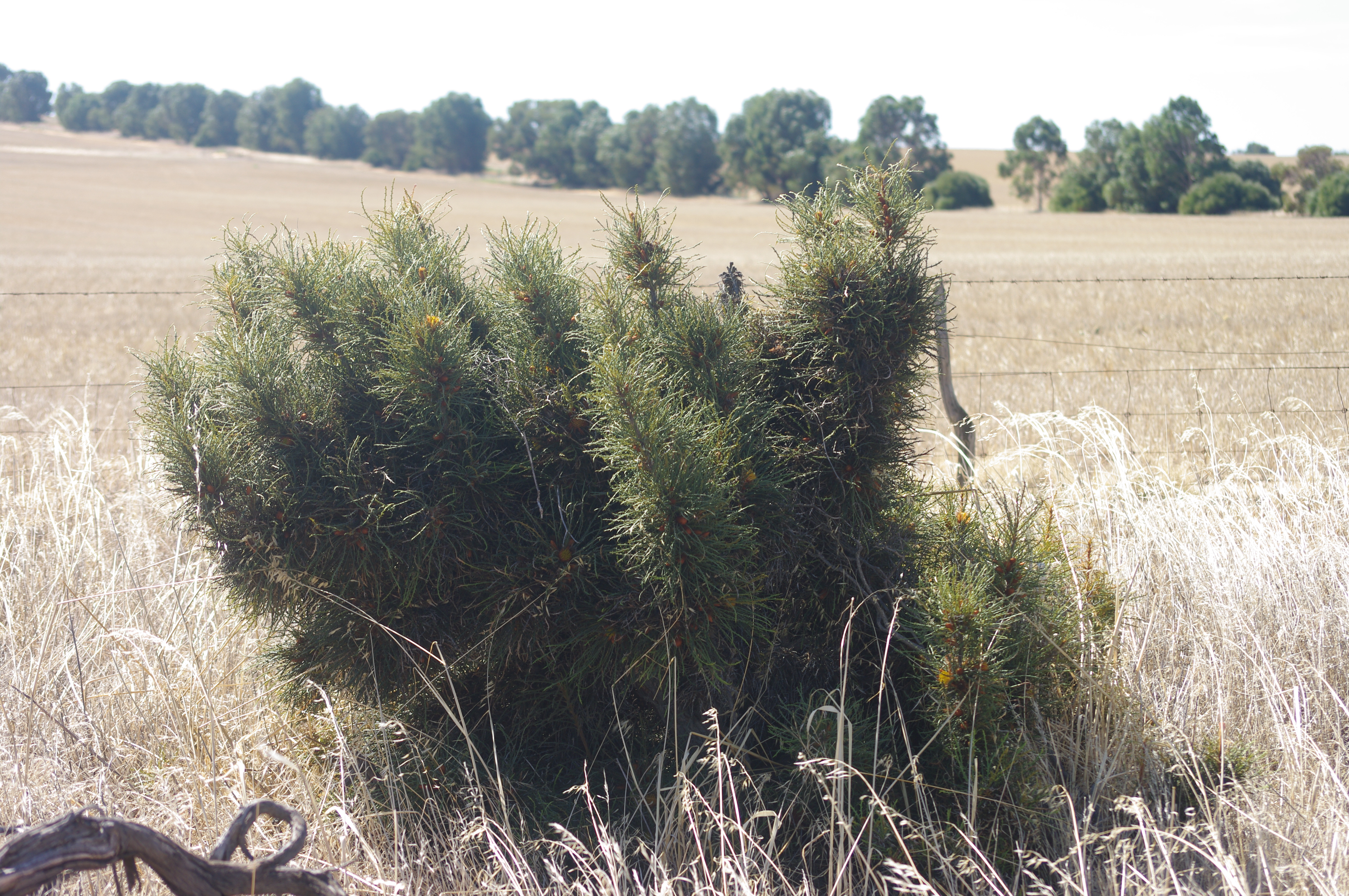

Conservation status
- Priority Three — Poorly Known Taxa (DEC)

Scientific classification
- Kingdom: Plantae
- Clade: Tracheophytes
- Clade: Angiosperms
- Clade: Eudicots
- Order: Proteales
- Family: Proteaceae
- Genus: Banksia
- Subgenus: Banksia subg. Banksia
- Series: Banksia ser. Dryandra
- Species: B. horrida

Binomial name
- Banksia horrida (Meisn.) A.R.Mast & K.R.Thiele

Synonyms
- Dryandra horrida Meisn.

= Banksia horrida =

Prickly dryandra

Species of shrub endemic to Western Australia

Banksia horrida, commonly known as prickly dryandra, is a species of shrub that is endemic to Western Australia. It has hairy stems, linear, pinnatifid leaves with sharply pointed teeth on the edges, up to sixty cream-coloured flowers in each head and hairy, egg-shaped follicles.

== Description ==
Banksia horrida is a species of shrub that typically grows to a height of 2 m (6 ft 7 in) and has hairy stems. The leaves are narrow linear in outline, 40–140 mm (1.6–5.5 in) long and 5–10 mm (0.20–0.39 in) wide on a petiole up to 15 mm (0.59 in) long. There are between five and twelve sharply pointed, triangular teeth on each side of the leaves. The flowers are arranged in heads of between thirty-five and sixty with densely hairy, linear involucral bracts up to 30 mm (1.2 in) long at the base of the head. The flowers have a yellow perianth 24–32 mm (0.94–1.26 in) long and a cream-coloured pistil 23–31 mm (0.91–1.22 in) long. Flowering occurs from April to June or in August and the follicles are egg-shaped, 11–12 mm (0.43–0.47 in) long and hairy.

== Taxonomy and naming ==
This species was first formally described in 1856 by Carl Meissner who gave it the name Dryandra horrida and published the description in de Candolle's Prodromus Systematis Naturalis Regni Vegetabilis from specimens collected by James Drummond in the Swan River Colony. The specific epithet (horrida) is a Latin word meaning "shaggy" or "prickly". In 2007 Austin Mast and Kevin Thiele transferred all dryandras to the genus Banksia and renamed this species Banksia hewardiana.

== Distribution and habitat ==
Banksia horrida grows in kwongan in scattered locations between Tammin, Corrigin and Narembeen in the Avon Wheatbelt biogeographic region.

== Conservation status ==
Banksia horrida is classified as "Priority Three" by the Government of Western Australia Department of Parks and Wildlife meaning that it is poorly known and known from only a few locations but is not under imminent threat.
