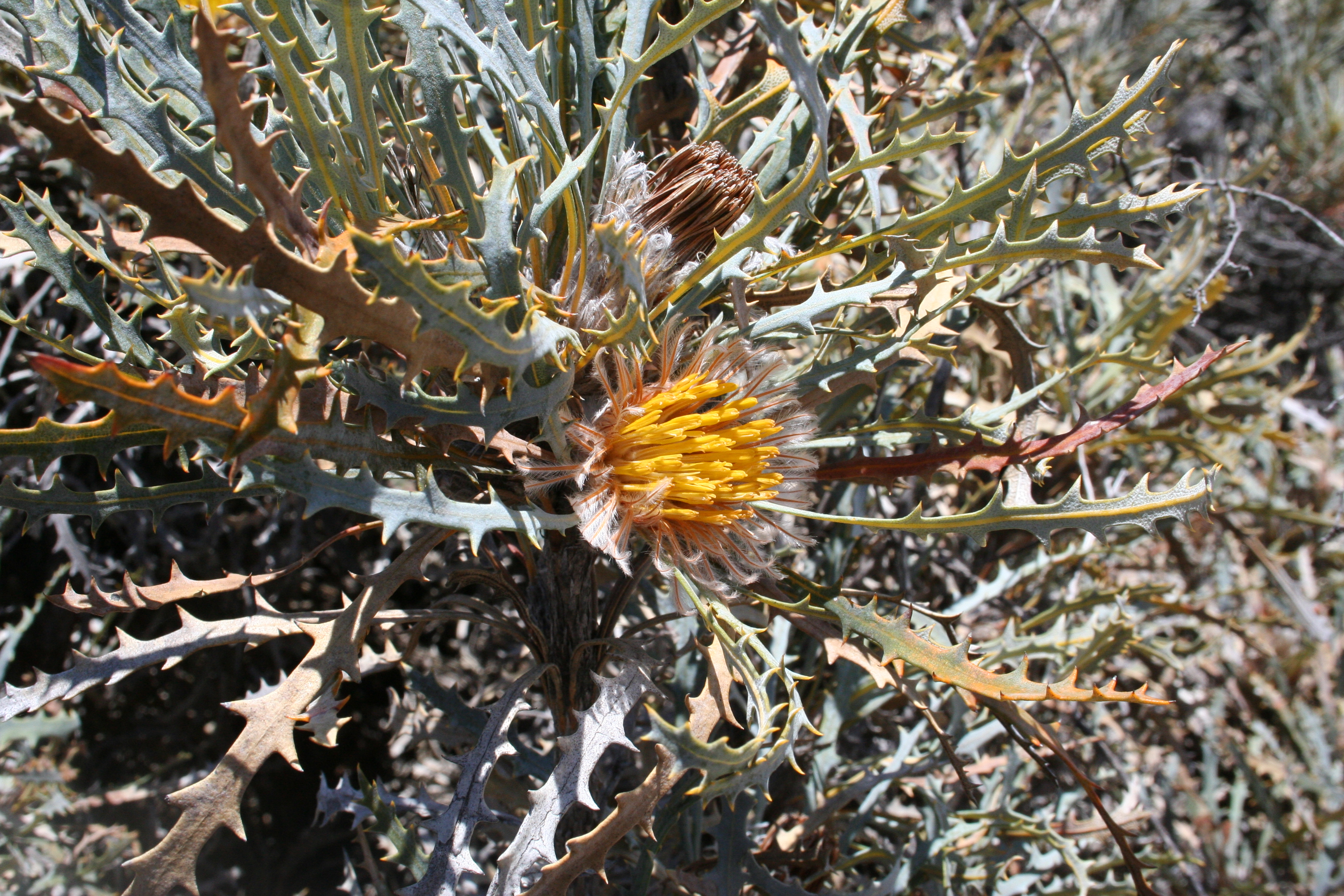
- At Charles Gardner Nature Reserve

Scientific classification
- Kingdom: Plantae
- Clade: Tracheophytes
- Clade: Angiosperms
- Clade: Eudicots
- Order: Proteales
- Family: Proteaceae
- Genus: Banksia
- Subgenus: Banksia subg. Banksia
- Series: Banksia ser. Dryandra
- Species: B. vestita

Binomial name
- Banksia vestita (Kippist ex Meisn.) A.R.Mast & K.R.Thiele
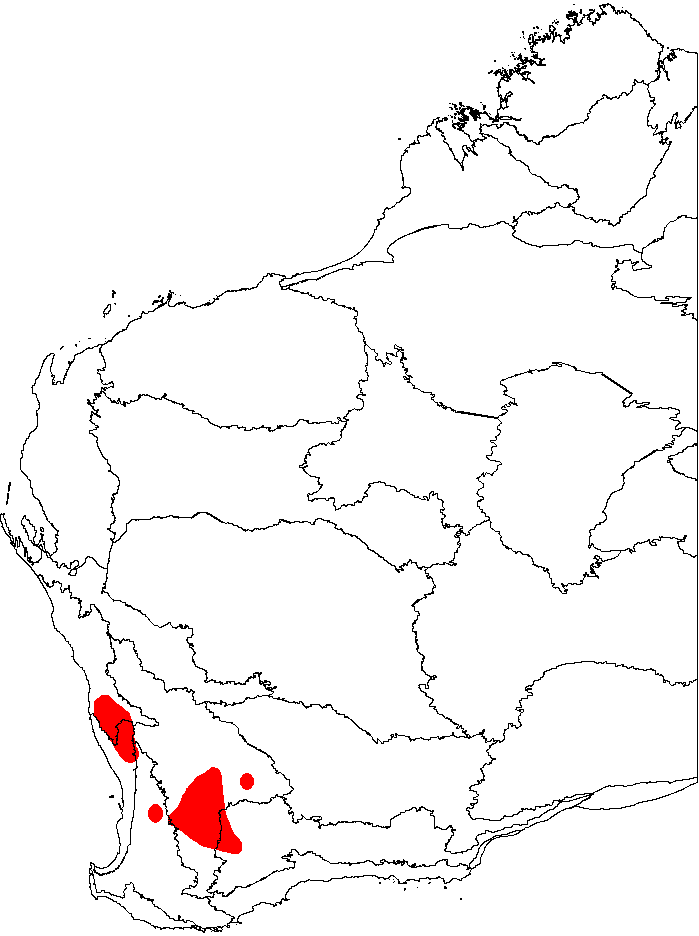
- Distribution of B. vestita, shown on a map of Western Australia's biogeographic regions

Synonyms
- Dryandra vestita Kippist ex Meisn.; Josephia vestita (Meisn.) Kuntze

= Banksia vestita =

Summer dryandra

Species of shrub endemic to Western Australia

Banksia vestita, commonly known as summer dryandra, is a species of shrub that is endemic to the southwest of Western Australia. It has broadly linear, pinnatifid leaves with sharply pointed teeth on both sides, yellow flowers in heads of between thirty and forty, and broadly egg-shaped follicles.

== Description ==
Banksia vestita is a shrub that typically grows to a height of 1.5 m (4 ft 11 in) high and forms a lignotuber. It has hairy stems and broadly linear leaves that are 80–150 mm (3.1–5.9 in) long and 7–13 mm (0.28–0.51 in) wide on a petiole 5–15 mm (0.20–0.59 in) long. There are between four and twelve sharply-pointed, triangular teeth on each side of the leaves. The flowers are golden yellow, and occur in a dome-shaped inflorescence up to 35 mm (1.4 in) across, typically containing thirty to forty flowers, with hairy, linear, tapering involucral bracts up to 20 mm (0.79 in) long at the base of the head. The perianth is 27–32 mm (1.1–1.3 in) long and the pistil 26–31 mm (1.0–1.2 in) long. Flowering occurs from January to April or in August and the fruit is a broadly egg-shaped follicle 10–14 mm (0.39–0.55 in) long.

== Taxonomy ==
The species was first collected by James Drummond in the 1840s, from a location described simply as "south-western W.A.". Richard Kippist subsequently named and formally described the species, and Kippist's description of Dryandra vestita was published in 1855 by Carl Meissner in Hooker's Journal of Botany and Kew Garden Miscellany. It was given the specific name "vestita" from the Latin vestitus ("clothed"), in reference to the hairy bracts that cover the lower parts of new shoots.

Otto Kuntze transferred Dryandra to Josephia in 1890, republishing D. vestita as Josephia vestita (Kippist ex Meisn.) Kuntze, but his changes were not accepted by the wider scientific community. In 1999, Alex George placed the species in Dryandra subgenus Dryandra, series Gymnocephalae.

Early in 2007, Austin Mast and Kevin Thiele transferred all Dryandra taxa to Banksia, giving this species the name Banksia vestita. As an interim measure, Mast and Thiele placed all but one Dryandra taxon in Banksia ser. Dryandra.

== Distribution and habitat ==
Banksia vestita grows in sand over laterite, amongst heath dominated by species of Proteaceae and Myrtaceae. It occurs from Eneabba in the north to Lake Grace in the south, thus ranging the Geraldton Sandplains, Swan Coastal Plain, Jarrah Forest, Avon Wheatbelt and Mallee biogeographic regions. This areas has annual average rainfall ranging from 350 to 600 millimetres (14 to 24 in), and between 66 and 116 days above 30 °C (86 °F). In southern parts of its distribution, the mean temperature range is 10.2 to 23.3 °C (50.4 to 73.9 °F); further north it is somewhat warmer, with a mean temperature range of 13.5 to 27.2 °C (56.3 to 81.0 °F).

== Ecology ==
Like most other Proteaceae, B. vestita has proteoid roots, roots with dense clusters of short lateral rootlets that form a mat in the soil just below the leaf litter. These enhance solubilisation of nutrients, thus allowing nutrient uptake in low-nutrient soils such as the phosphorus-deficient native soils of Australia. It has a lignotuber, so it is able to resprout from below the ground following a bushfire; bushfire also triggers the release of its seed, an adaptation known as serotiny.

An assessment of the potential impact of climate change on this species found that its range is likely to contract by between 30% and 80% by 2080, depending on the severity of the change.

== Conservation status ==
Summer dryandra is classified as "not threatened" by the Western Australian Government Department of Parks and Wildlife.

== Use in horticulture ==
Banksia vestita is not often cultivated, as it is not considered a particularly attractive plant. In cultivation it grows slowly, but is long-lived; specimens at the Royal Botanic Gardens, Cranbourne are still healthy and flowering at twenty years of age. It takes from six to seven weeks to germinate, with a germination success rate of around 70%. It requires a very well drained sandy soil in full sun. It tolerates drought well, is moderately frost-tolerant, and takes pruning well.
