= Banksia concinna =

Conservation status
- Priority Four — Rare Taxa (DEC)

Scientific classification
- Kingdom: Plantae
- Clade: Tracheophytes
- Clade: Angiosperms
- Clade: Eudicots
- Order: Proteales
- Family: Proteaceae
- Genus: Banksia
- Subgenus: Banksia subg. Banksia
- Series: Banksia ser. Dryandra
- Species: B. concinna

Binomial name
- Banksia concinna (R.Br.) A.R.Mast & K.R.Thiele

Synonyms
- Dryandra concinna R.Br.; Josephia concinna (R.Br.) Kuntze

Species of shrub endemic to Western Australia

Banksia concinna is a species of shrub that is endemic to Western Australia. It has elliptical leaves with between five and twenty triangular teeth on each side, hairy heads of yellow flowers and hairy, egg-shaped fruit.

== Description ==
Banksia comosa is an erect shrub with a single or a few main stems and that typically grows to a height of 4 m (13 ft) but does not form a lignotuber. It has elliptical leaves that are 30–150 mm (1.2–5.9 in) long and 10–30 mm (0.39–1.18 in) wide on a petiole 3–6 mm (0.12–0.24 in) long. Each side of the leaf has between seven and twenty triangular teeth. The flowers are pale yellow and borne in heads of 32 to 36 on a short side branch, the heads surrounded by linear to narrow egg-shaped, silky-hairy involucral bracts that are up to 8 mm (0.31 in) long. The perianth is hairy, 13–17 mm (0.51–0.67 in) long and a bent pistil 17–20 mm (0.67–0.79 in) long. Flowering occurs from August to November and the fruit is an egg-shaped, hairy follicle 10–13 mm (0.39–0.51 in) long.

== Taxonomy and naming ==
This species was first formally described in 1830 by Robert Brown who gave it the name Dryandra concinna and published the description in the supplement to his Prodromus Florae Novae Hollandiae et Insulae Van Diemen. The specific epithet (concinna) is a Latin word meaning "pretty", "neat" or "elegant". In 2007 Austin Mast and Kevin Thiele transferred all dryandras to the genus Banksia and renamed this species Banksia concinna.

== Distribution and habitat ==
Banksia concinna grows in dense kwongan and shrubland in the Stirling Range National Park and near Albany.

== Conservation status ==
This banksia is classified as "Priority Four" by the Government of Western Australia Department of Parks and Wildlife, meaning that is rare or near threatened.
