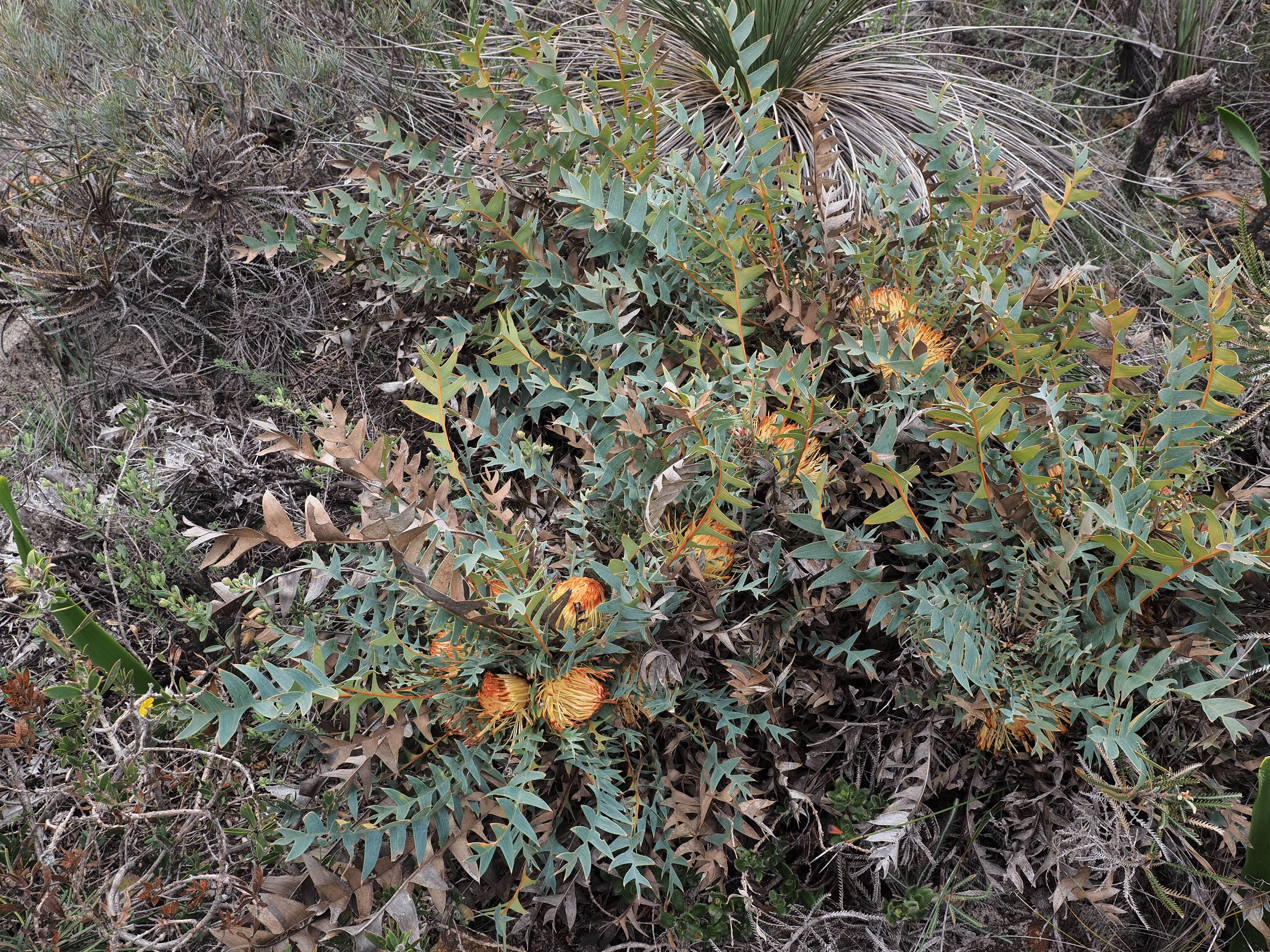

Conservation status
- Vulnerable (EPBC Act)

Scientific classification
- Kingdom: Plantae
- Clade: Tracheophytes
- Clade: Angiosperms
- Clade: Eudicots
- Order: Proteales
- Family: Proteaceae
- Genus: Banksia
- Subgenus: Banksia subg. Banksia
- Series: Banksia ser. Dryandra
- Species: B. catoglypta

Binomial name
- Banksia catoglypta (A.S.George) A.R.Mast & K.R.Thiele

Synonyms
- Dryandra catoglypta A.S.George

= Banksia catoglypta =

Species of shrub endemic to Western Australia

Banksia catoglypta is a species of shrub that is endemic to Western Australia. It has pinnatisect leaves with sharply-pointed, triangular lobes and heads of golden brown and cream-coloured flowers.

== Species description ==
Banksia catoglypta is a shrub that typically grows to 1 m (3 ft 3 in) high and wide but lacks a lignotuber. The stems have characteristic, prominent egg-shaped to oval bracts at the base of each new year's growth. The leaves are 150–300 mm (5.9–11.8 in) long, 25–70 mm (0.98–2.76 in) wide on a petiole 15–18 mm (0.59–0.71 in) long and pinnatisect with between ten and fifteen sharply pointed, triangular lobes on each side. The flowers are arranged in groups of between 85 and 110 in each head on the end of a short branchlet. The heads are surrounded by silky-hairy, egg-shaped to oblong involucral bracts up to 25 mm (0.98 in) long. Each flower has a golden brown perianth 44–56 mm (1.7–2.2 in) long and a cream-coloured pistil 46–64 mm (1.8–2.5 in) long with a dull reddish pink pollen presenter 8–9 mm (0.31–0.35 in) long. Flowering occurs from June to July and the fruit is a broadly egg-shaped follicle 15–17 mm (0.59–0.67 in) long and 17–20 mm (0.67–0.79 in) wide.

== Taxonomy and naming ==
This species was first formally described in 1996 by Alex George in the journal Nuytsia and given the name Dryandra catoglypta. The specific epithet (catoglypta) is derived from ancient Greek words meaning "downwards" and "carved", referring to the bracts on the stem. In 2007 Austin Mast and Kevin Thiele transferred all dryandras to the genus Banksia.

== Ecology ==
Banksia catoglypta is obligately outcrossed and primarily pollinated by the white-cheeked honeyeater, and feral European honeybees. However, small mammals also contribute to pollination of this species with the honey possum and feral house mouse commonly visiting the flowers.

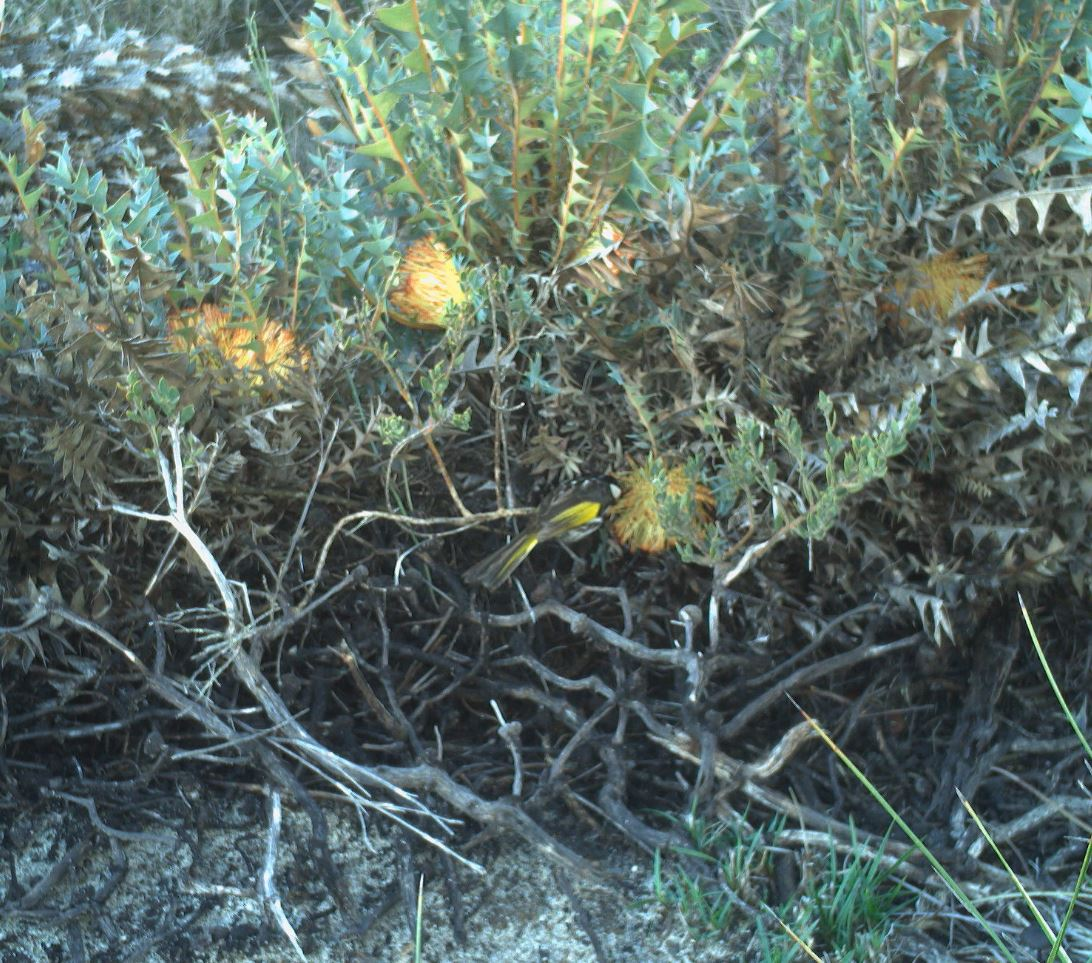
White-cheeked honeyeater foraging on an inflorescence of B. catoglypta

== Distribution and habitat ==
This banksia grows on breakaways in kwongan on the Gairdner Range and north of Badgingarra in the Geraldton Sandplains biogeographic region.

== Conservation status ==
Banksia catoglypta is classified as "vulnerable" under the Australian Government Environment Protection and Biodiversity Conservation Act 1999 and as "Threatened" by the Western Australian Government Department of Biodiversity, Conservation and Attractions, meaning that it is in danger of extinction. The main threats to the species are inappropriate fire regimes, grazing by rabbits, land clearing and weed invasion.
