= Banksia foliosissima =

Conservation status
- Priority Four — Rare Taxa (DEC)

Scientific classification
- Kingdom: Plantae
- Clade: Tracheophytes
- Clade: Angiosperms
- Clade: Eudicots
- Order: Proteales
- Family: Proteaceae
- Genus: Banksia
- Subgenus: Banksia subg. Banksia
- Series: Banksia ser. Dryandra
- Species: B. foliosissima

Binomial name
- Banksia foliosissima (C.A.Gardner) A.R.Mast & K.R.Thiele

Synonyms
- Dryandra foliosissima C.A.Gardner

Species of shrub endemic to Western Australia

Banksia foliosissima is a species of erect shrub that is endemic to Western Australia. It has densely crowded, pinnatifid leaves, golden yellow flowers in heads of up to one hundred, and egg-shaped follicles. It is only known from two small areas in the south-west of the state.

== Description ==
Banksia foliosissima is a shrub that typically grows to a height of 1–2 m (3 ft 3 in – 6 ft 7 in) but does not form a lignotuber. It has hairy branchlets and linear pinnatifid leaves 150–270 mm (5.9–10.6 in) long and 4–8 mm (0.16–0.31 in) wide on a petiole up to 40 mm (1.6 in) long, with between 25 and 45 triangular teeth on each side. The flowers are borne on a head containing between ninety and one hundred flowers in each head. There are oblong to lance-shaped involucral bracts up to 30 mm (1.2 in) long at the base of the head. The flowers have a golden yellow perianth 27–30 mm (1.1–1.2 in) long and a cream-coloured pistil 30–40 mm (1.2–1.6 in) long. Flowering occurs in May or August and the fruit is a hairy, egg-shaped follicle 18–21 mm (0.71–0.83 in) long.

== Taxonomy and naming ==
This species was first formally described in 1964 by Charles Austin Gardner who gave it the name Dryandra foliosissima and published the description in the Journal of the Royal Society of Western Australia from specimens he collected near Ravensthorpe.

In 2007, Austin Mast and Kevin Thiele transferred all the dryandras to the genus Banksia and this species became Banksia foliosissima. The specific epithet (foliosissima) is a Latin word meaning "leafy".

== Distribution and habitat ==
Banksia foliosissima is only known from two disjunct areas, one near Tarin Rock and the other near Ravensthorpe, where it grows in dense kwongan.

== Conservation status ==
This banksia is classified as "Priority Four" by the Government of Western Australia Department of Parks and Wildlife, meaning that is rare or near threatened.
