= Hooker's Journal of Botany and Kew Garden Miscellany =

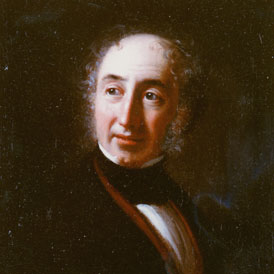
Sir William Hooker

Hooker's Journal of Botany and Kew Garden Miscellany was a scientific journal edited by Sir William Hooker that was published in nine volumes between 1849 and 1857.
