= Dryandra ser. Niveae =

Obsolete series of plants

Dryandra ser. Niveae is an obsolete series within the former genus Dryandra (now Banksia ser. Dryandra). It was first published by George Bentham in 1870, and was given a new circumscription by Alex George in 1996, but was ultimately discarded in 2007 when Austin Mast and Kevin Thiele sunk Dryandra into Banksia.

== According to Bentham ==
Bentham's definition of D. ser. Niveae was "Flowering stems from a creeping trunk very short, with one or few ovoid flower-heads surrounded by long floral leaves. Leaves pinnate with numerous rigid segments white underneath except in D. nana." Four species were included; the placement and circumscription of the series may be summarised as follows:

Dryandra (now Banksia ser. Dryandra)

D. sect. Eudryandra

D. ser. Armatæ (7 species)
D. ser. Floribundæ (5 species, 2 varieties)
D. ser. Concinnæ (4 species)
D. ser. Formosæ (5 species)
D. ser. Niveae

D. nivea (now B. nivea)
D. arctotidis (now B. arctotidis)

D. arctotidis var. tortifolia (now B. tortifolia)

D. nana (now B. nana)
D. Preissii (now B. acuminata)

D. ser. Obvallatæ (12 species)
D. ser. Gymnocephalæ (3 species)

D. sect. Aphragma (7 species, 2 varieties)

== According to George ==
With the passage of time following the publication of Bentham's arrangement, D. ser. Niveae was gradually abandoned. As the flowers and fruit are highly similar across all species in the series, it is difficult to distinguish individual species. For this reason the name Dryandra nivea began to be used in a broad sense, to refer to the entire group, and the other species names fell into disuse.

When Alex George published his revision of Dryandra in 1996, he recognised that there were several taxa in the series, and that these could be distinguished by their leaf shape. He resurrected a number of abandoned names, and published some new species and varieties. A new circumscription was given for the series: essentially the series was defined as containing those species in which the flowers of a flower head form a circle about a central hole.

George's placement and circumscription of D. ser. Niveae, as amended in 1999 and 2005, may be summarised as follows:

Dryandra (now Banksia ser. Dryandra)

D. subg. Dryandra

D. ser. Floribundae (1 species, 4 varieties)
D. ser. Armatae (21 species, 7 subspecies, 4 varieties)
D. ser. Marginatae (1 species)
D. ser. Folliculosae (1 species, 5 varieties)
D. ser. Acrodontae (4 species, 2 varieties)
D. ser. Capitellatae (2 species, 2 subspecies)
D. ser. Ilicinae (3 species, 2 varieties)
D. ser. Dryandra (3 species, 2 subspecies)
D. ser. Foliosae (3 species, 2 subspecies)
D. ser. Decurrentes (1 species)
D. ser. Tenuifoliae (2 species, 2 varieties)
D. ser. Runcinatae (4 species, 7 subspecies)
D. ser. Triangulares (3 species, 3 subspecies)
D. ser. Aphragma (9 species, 3 subspecies)
D. ser. Ionthocarpae (1 species, 2 subspecies)
D. ser. Inusitatae (1 species)
D. ser. Subulatae (1 species)
D. ser. Gymnocephalae (11 species, 4 subspecies, 2 varieties)
D. ser. Plumosae (3 species, 2 subspecies)
D. ser. Concinnae (3 species)
D. ser. Obvallatae (7 species, 2 varieties)
D. ser. Pectinatae (1 species)
D. ser. Acuminatae (1 species)
D. ser. Niveae

D. arctotidis (now B. arctotidis)
D. tortifolia (now B. tortifolia)
D. stenoprion (now B. stenoprion)
D. cypholoba (now B. cypholoba)
D. lindleyana (now B. dallanneyi)

D. lindleyana subsp. lindleyana (now B. dallanneyi subsp. dallanneyi)
D. lindleyana subsp. pollosta (now B. dallanneyi subsp. pollosta)
D. lindleyana subsp. media (now B. dallanneyi subsp. media)
D. lindleyana subsp. agricola (now B. dallanneyi subsp. agricola)
D. lindleyana subsp. sylvestris (now B. dallanneyi subsp. sylvestris)

D. brownii (now B. brunnea)
D. nivea (now B. nivea)

D. nivea subsp. nivea (now B. nivea subsp. nivea)
D. nivea subsp. uliginosa (now B. nivea subsp. uliginosa)

D. subg. Hemiclidia (2 species)
D. subg. Diplophragma (1 species)

== Recent developments ==
Since 1998, Austin Mast has been publishing results of ongoing cladistic analyses of DNA sequence data for the subtribe Banksiinae. His analyses have provided compelling evidence of the paraphyly of Banksia with respect to Dryandra; that is, it seems that Dryandra arose from within the ranks of Banksia. Early in 2007, Mast and Kevin Thiele initiated a rearrangement of Banksia by sinking Dryandra into it as B. ser. Dryandra. This transfer necessitated the setting aside of George's infrageneric arrangement of Dryandra; thus D. ser. Niveae is no longer current. Mast and Thiele have foreshadowed publishing a full arrangement once DNA sampling of Dryandra is complete.
