= Dryandra ser. Plumosae =

Obsolete series of plants

Dryandra ser. Plumosae is an obsolete series within the former genus Dryandra (now Banksia ser. Dryandra). It was published by Alex George in 1996, but discarded in 2007 when Austin Mast and Kevin Thiele sank Dryandra into Banksia.

== Publication ==
George published the series in his 1996 "New taxa and a new infrageneric classification in Dryandra R.Br.", naming it after the type species, D. plumosa (now Banksia plumosa). It was defined as containing three species, D. plumosa, D. pseudoplumosa (now B. pseudoplumosa) and D. montana (now B. montana. All three species are dense bushy shrubs, without a lignotuber; and all have long hairs on the stems and about the flower heads. In addition, all three are restricted to western parts of the Esperance Plains region of Western Australia, between the Stirling Range and the Fitzgerald River region.

George's placement and circumscription of D. ser. Plumosae, as amended in his 1999 treatment of Dryandra for the Flora of Australia series, and in 2005, may be summarised as follows:

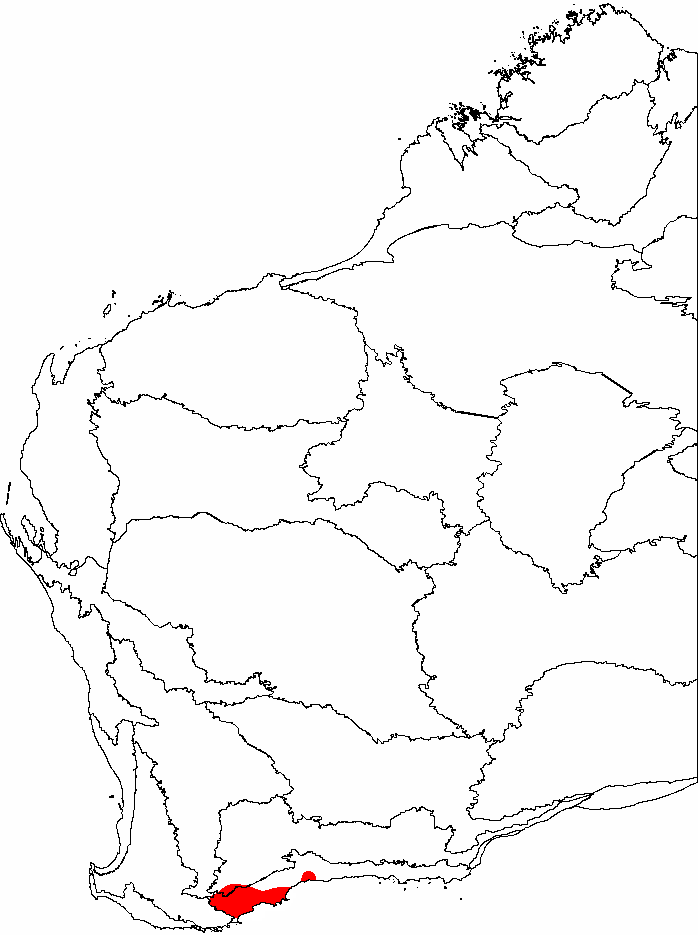
D. ser. Plumosae comprises three species, all of which occur only between the Stirling Range and the Fitzgerald River region in southwest Western Australia.

Dryandra (now Banksia ser. Dryandra)

D. subg. Dryandra

D. ser. Floribundae (1 species, 4 varieties)
D. ser. Armatae (21 species, 7 subspecies, 4 varieties)
D. ser. Marginatae (1 species)
D. ser. Folliculosae (1 species, 5 varieties)
D. ser. Acrodontae (4 species, 2 varieties)
D. ser. Capitellatae (2 species, 2 subspecies)
D. ser. Ilicinae (3 species, 2 varieties)
D. ser. Dryandra (3 species, 2 subspecies)
D. ser. Foliosae (3 species, 2 subspecies)
D. ser. Decurrentes (1 species)
D. ser. Tenuifoliae (2 species, 2 varieties)
D. ser. Runcinatae (4 species, 7 subspecies)
D. ser. Triangulares (3 species, 3 subspecies)
D. ser. Aphragma (9 species, 3 subspecies)
D. ser. Ionthocarpae (1 species, 2 subspecies)
D. ser. Inusitatae (1 species)
D. ser. Subulatae (1 species)
D. ser. Gymnocephalae (11 species, 4 subspecies, 2 varieties)
D. ser. Plumosae

D. plumosa (now Banksia plumosa)

D. plumosa subsp. plumosa (now Banksia plumosa subsp. plumosa)
D. plumosa subsp. denticulata (now Banksia plumosa subsp. denticulata)

D. pseudoplumosa (now Banksia pseudoplumosa)
D. montana (now Banksia montana)

D. ser. Concinnae (3 species)
D. ser. Obvallatae (7 species, 2 varieties)
D. ser. Pectinatae (1 species)
D. ser. Acuminatae (1 species)
D. ser. Niveae

D. subg. Hemiclidia (2 species)
D. subg. Diplophragma (1 species)

== Abandonment ==
Since 1998, Austin Mast has been publishing results of ongoing cladistic analyses of DNA sequence data for the subtribe Banksiinae. His analyses have provided compelling evidence of the paraphyly of Banksia with respect to Dryandra; that is, it seems that Dryandra arose from within the ranks of Banksia. Early in 2007, Mast and Kevin Thiele initiated a rearrangement of Banksia by sinking Dryandra into it as B. ser. Dryandra. This transfer necessitated the setting aside of George's infrageneric arrangement of Dryandra; thus D. ser. Plumosae is no longer current. Mast and Thiele have foreshadowed publishing a full arrangement once DNA sampling of Dryandra is complete.
