= Dryandra ser. Capitellatae =

Obsolete series of plants

Dryandra ser. Capitellatae is an obsolete series within the former genus Dryandra (now Banksia ser. Dryandra). It was published by Alex George in 1996, but discarded in 2007 when Austin Mast and Kevin Thiele sank Dryandra into Banksia.

== Publication ==
George published the series in his 1996 "New taxa and a new infrageneric classification in Dryandra R.Br.", naming it from the Latin capitulum ("head") and -ella (the feminine diminutive), in reference to the small flower heads. It was defined as containing two species, D. serratuloides (now Banksia serratuloides) and D. meganotia (now Banksia meganotia), the former being designated the type species of the series. Both species small lignotuberous shrubs with small flower heads, short leaves, and very small elliptical follicles.

George's placement and circumscription of D. ser. Capitellatae, with 1999 and 2005 amendments, may be summarised as follows:

Dryandra (now Banksia ser. Dryandra)

D. subg. Dryandra

D. ser. Floribundae (1 species, 4 varieties)
D. ser. Armatae (21 species, 7 subspecies, 4 varieties)
D. ser. Marginatae (1 species)
D. ser. Folliculosae (1 species, 5 varieties)
D. ser. Acrodontae (4 species, 2 varieties)
D. ser. Capitellatae

D. serratuloides (now Banksia serratuloides)

D. serratuloides subsp. serratuloides (now Banksia serratuloides subsp. serratuloides)
D. serratuloides subsp. perissa (now Banksia serratuloides subsp. perissa)

D. meganotia (now Banksia meganotia)

D. ser. Ilicinae (3 species, 2 varieties)
D. ser. Dryandra (3 species, 2 subspecies)
D. ser. Foliosae (3 species, 2 subspecies)
D. ser. Decurrentes (1 species)
D. ser. Tenuifoliae (2 species, 2 varieties)
D. ser. Runcinatae (4 species, 7 subspecies)
D. ser. Triangulares (3 species, 3 subspecies)
D. ser. Aphragma (9 species, 3 subspecies)
D. ser. Ionthocarpae (1 species, 2 subspecies)
D. ser. Inusitatae (1 species)
D. ser. Subulatae (1 species)
D. ser. Gymnocephalae (11 species, 4 subspecies, 2 varieties)
D. ser. Plumosae (3 species, 2 subspecies)
D. ser. Concinnae (3 species)
D. ser. Obvallatae (7 species, 2 varieties)
D. ser. Pectinatae (1 species)
D. ser. Acuminatae (1 species)
D. ser. Niveae

D. subg. Hemiclidia (2 species)
D. subg. Diplophragma (1 species)

== Abandonment ==
Since 1998, Austin Mast has been publishing results of ongoing cladistic analyses of DNA sequence data for the subtribe Banksiinae. His analyses have provided compelling evidence of the paraphyly of Banksia with respect to Dryandra; that is, it seems that Dryandra arose from within the ranks of Banksia. Early in 2007, Mast and Kevin Thiele initiated a rearrangement of Banksia by sinking Dryandra into it as B. ser. Dryandra. This transfer necessitated the setting aside of George's infrageneric arrangement of Dryandra; thus D. ser. Capitellatae is no longer current. Mast and Thiele have foreshadowed publishing a full arrangement once DNA sampling of Dryandra is complete.
