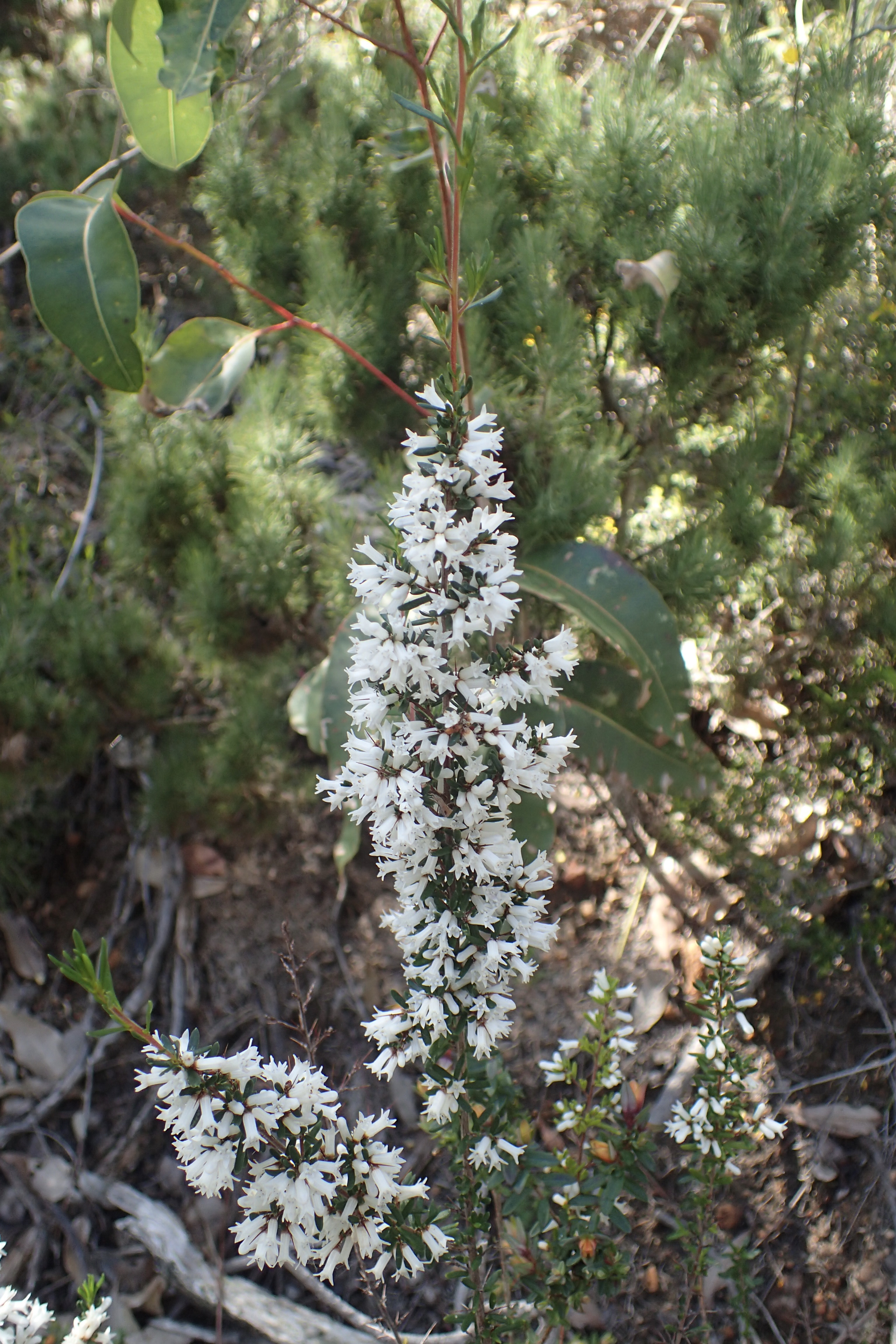
- Near Meelup Beach in Meelup Regional Park

Scientific classification
- Kingdom: Plantae
- Clade: Tracheophytes
- Clade: Angiosperms
- Clade: Eudicots
- Clade: Rosids
- Order: Rosales
- Family: Rhamnaceae
- Genus: Cryptandra
- Species: C. arbutiflora

Binomial name
- Cryptandra arbutiflora Fenzl

Synonyms
- Cryptandra suavis Lindl.; Wichuraea arbutiflora (Fenzl) Nees ex Reissek

= Cryptandra arbutiflora =

Species of flowering plant

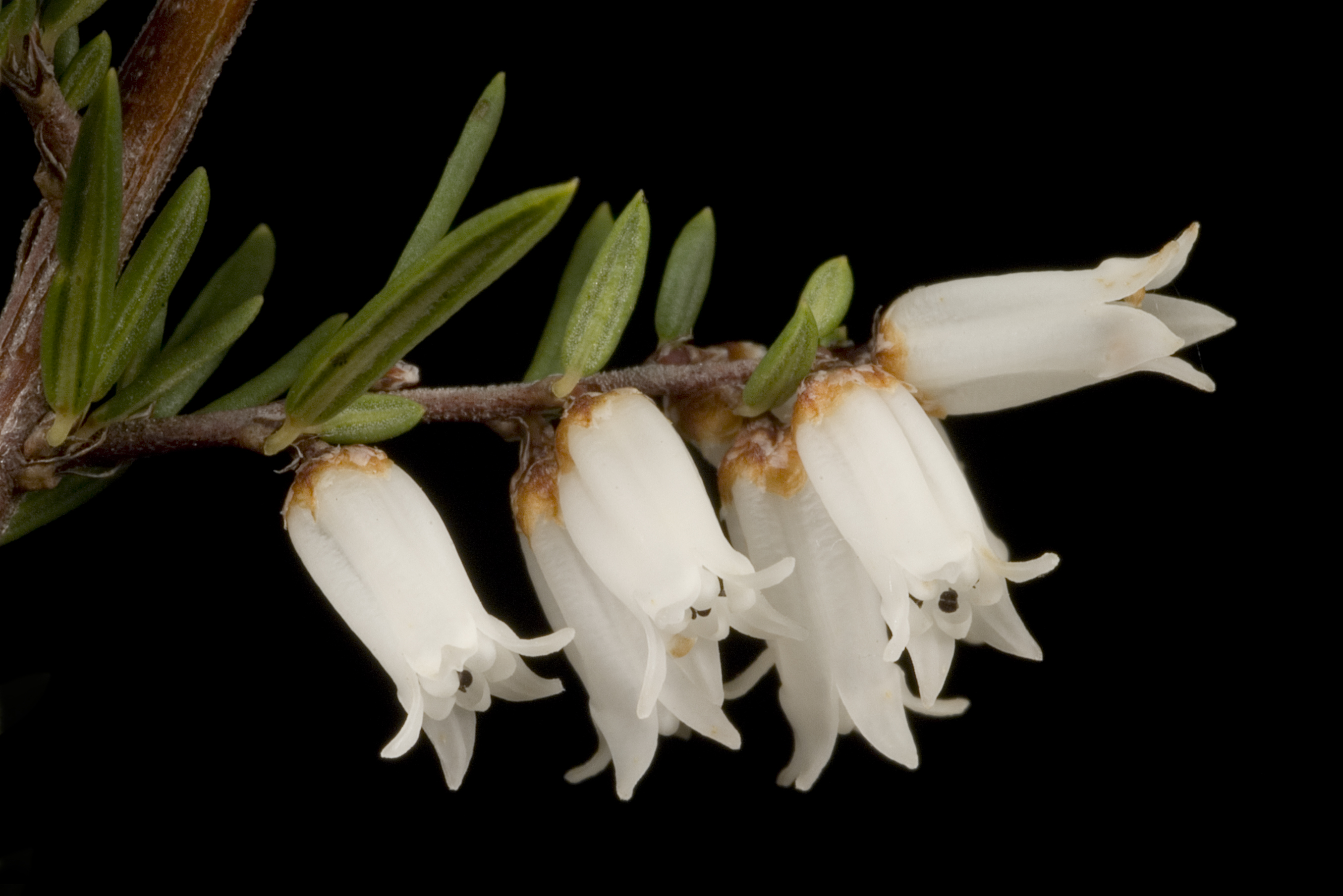
Leaf and flower detail

Cryptandra arbutiflora, commonly known as waxy cryptandra, is a species of flowering plant in the family Rhamnaceae and is endemic to the southwest of Western Australia. It is a shrub with spiny branches, elliptic to linear leaves and tube-shaped white flowers.

== Description ==
Cryptandra arbutiflora is a shrub that typically grows to a height of 0.5–1 m (1 ft 8 in – 3 ft 3 in) and has spiny branchlets. Its leaves are linear to oblong with the edges turned down, more or less glabrous, 2.5–9 mm (0.098–0.354 in) long and 0.8–2.5 mm (0.031–0.098 in) wide on a petiole 0.5–1 mm (0.020–0.039 in) long. The sepals are 1.2–1.5 mm (0.047–0.059 in) long, the petals white and tube-shaped, the tube part 2.2–5 mm (0.087–0.197 in) long with the style usually reaching to near the end of the tube. Flowering occurs from May to November and the fruit is 2.5–2.8 mm (0.098–0.110 in) long.

== Taxonomy ==
This species was first formally described by botanist Eduard Fenzl based on plant material collected by Charles von Hügel from the Swan River area. Fenzl's description was published in 1837 in Enumeratio plantarum quas in Novae Hollandiae ora austro-occidentali ad fluvium Cygnorum et in sinu Regis Georgii collegit Carolus Liber Baro de Hügel. The Latin specific epithet arbutiflora alludes to the flowers which are reminiscent of those of Arbutus unedo, the strawberry tree.

Four varieties are currently accepted by the Australian Plant Census:

- Cryptandra arbutiflora Fenzl var. arbutiflora is a shrub 0.1–1 mm (0.0039–0.0394 in) high with straight stem hairs, a floral tube 1.2–4.5 mm (0.047–0.177 in) long, an ovary that is largely superior in fruit within a broad floral tube, and glabrous fruit.
- Cryptandra arbutiflora var. borealis Rye has curved stem hairs and scattered large star-shaped hairs on the fruit.
- Cryptandra arbutiflora var. pygmaea Rye is a dwarf shrub 0.05–0.25 mm (0.0020–0.0098 in) high with straight stem hairs and a floral tube about 1 mm (0.039 in) long.
- Cryptandra arbutiflora var. tubulosa (Fenzl) Benth. is a shrub 0.1–1 mm (0.0039–0.0394 in) high with straight stem hairs, a floral tube 1.2–4.5 mm (0.047–0.177 in) long, an ovary that is half inferior in fruit within a narrow floral tube, and glabrous fruit.

A former variety C. arbutiflora var. intermedia is now regarded as a species in its own right - Cryptandra intermedia.

== Distribution and habitat ==
Cryptandra arbutiflora occurs between the south coast and the Dandaragan area to the north and also near Geraldton. It grows in a variety of soils on granite outcrops, breakaways and creek banks.

The variety arbutiflora is found in the Gillingarra to Mount Barker and Jerramungup areas, var. borealis from Kalbarri to the Chapman River, var. pygmaea near Lake Muir, and var. tubulosa from Perth to the Kent River.

== Conservation status ==
Three varieties of C. arbutiflora are listed as "not threatened" by the Western Australian Government Department of Biodiversity, Conservation and Attractions but var. pygmaea is classified as "Priority Three" by the Government of Western Australia Department of Biodiversity, Conservation and Attractions, meaning that it is poorly known and known from only a few locations but is not under imminent threat.
