= Leucopogon cinereus =

Scientific classification
- Kingdom: Plantae
- Clade: Tracheophytes
- Clade: Angiosperms
- Clade: Eudicots
- Clade: Asterids
- Order: Ericales
- Family: Ericaceae
- Genus: Leucopogon
- Species: L. cinereus

Binomial name
- Leucopogon cinereus E.Pritz.
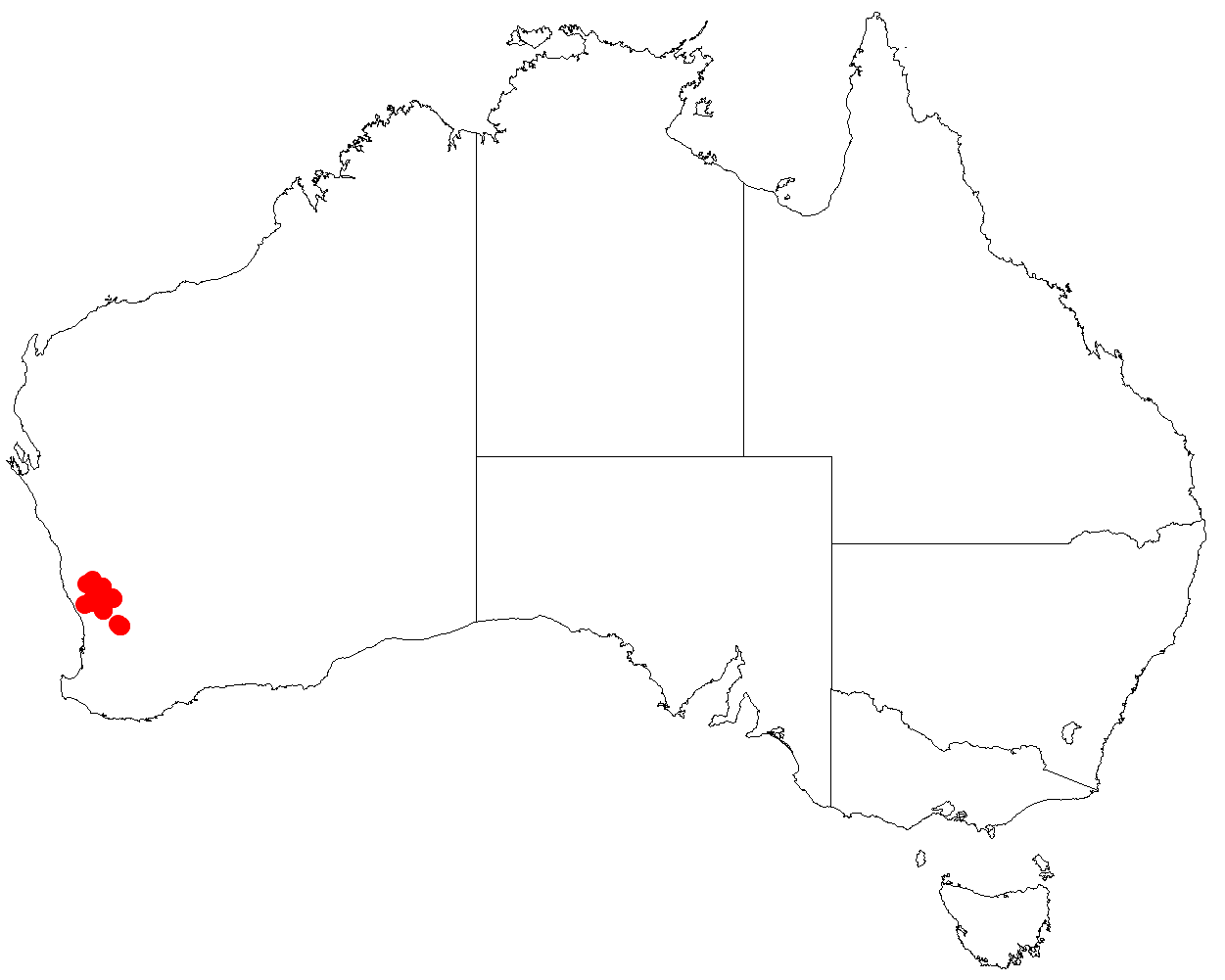
- Occurrence data from AVH

Synonyms
- Styphelia cinerea (E.Pritz.) Sleumer

Species of plant

Leucopogon cinereus is a species of flowering plant in the heath family Ericaceae and is endemic to the south-west of Western Australia. It is an erect, compact shrub that typically grows to a height of 0.3–1 m (1 ft 0 in – 3 ft 3 in) and has white flowers from August to October. It was first formally described in 1904 by Ernst Georg Pritzel in Botanische Jahrbücher für Systematik, Pflanzengeschichte und Pflanzengeographie from specimens collected on rocky hills near Gillingarra. The specific epithet (cinereus) means "grey", referring to the colour of the young stems and leaves.

This leucopogon grows in woodland and on dry slopes in the Avon Wheatbelt, Geraldton Sandplains, Jarrah Forest and Swan Coastal Plain bioregions of south-western Western Australia and is listed as "not threatened" by the Western Australian Government Department of Biodiversity, Conservation and Attractions.
