= Banksia dallanneyi var. mellicula =

Scientific classification
- Kingdom: Plantae
- Clade: Tracheophytes
- Clade: Angiosperms
- Clade: Eudicots
- Order: Proteales
- Family: Proteaceae
- Genus: Banksia
- Species: B. dallanneyi
- Subspecies: B. d. subsp. dallanneyi
- Variety: B. d. var. mellicula

Trinomial name
- Banksia dallanneyi var. mellicula (A.S.George) A.R.Mast & K.R.Thiele

Synonyms
- Dryandra lindleyana var. mellicula A.S.George

Variety of plant found in Australia

Banksia dallanneyi var. mellicula is a variety of Banksia dallanneyi subsp. dallanneyi. It was known as Dryandra lindleyana var. mellicula until 2007, when Austin Mast and Kevin Thiele sunk all Dryandra into Banksia. Since there was already a Banksia named Banksia lindleyana, Mast and Thiele had to choose a new specific epithet for D. lindleyana and hence for this variety of it. As with other members of Banksia ser. Dryandra, it is endemic to the South West Botanical Province of Western Australia.
