= Banksia dallanneyi var. dallanneyi =

Scientific classification
- Kingdom: Plantae
- Clade: Tracheophytes
- Clade: Angiosperms
- Clade: Eudicots
- Order: Proteales
- Family: Proteaceae
- Genus: Banksia
- Species: B. dallanneyi A.R.Mast & K.R.Thiele
- Subspecies: B. d. subsp. dallanneyi
- Variety: B. d. var. dallanneyi

Trinomial name
- Banksia dallanneyi var. dallanneyi

Synonyms
- Dryandra lindleyana var. lindleyana

Variety of plant native to Australia

Banksia dallanneyi var. dallanneyi is a variety of Banksia dallanneyi subsp. dallanneyi. It was known as Dryandra lindleyana var. lindleyana until 2007, when Austin Mast and Kevin Thiele sunk all Dryandra into Banksia. Since the name Banksia lindleyana had already been used, Mast and Thiele had to choose a new specific epithet for D. lindleyana and hence for this variety of it. As with other members of Banksia ser. Dryandra, it is endemic to the South West Botanical Province of Western Australia. As an autonym, it is defined as encompassing the type material of the species.
