= Banksia meganotia =

Conservation status
- Priority Three — Poorly Known Taxa (DEC)

Scientific classification
- Kingdom: Plantae
- Clade: Tracheophytes
- Clade: Angiosperms
- Clade: Eudicots
- Order: Proteales
- Family: Proteaceae
- Genus: Banksia
- Subgenus: Banksia subg. Banksia
- Series: Banksia ser. Dryandra
- Species: B. meganotia

Binomial name
- Banksia meganotia (A.S.George) A.R.Mast & K.R.Thiele

Synonyms
- Dryandra meganotia A.S.George

Species of shrub in Western Australia

Banksia meganotia is a species of prickly shrub that is endemic to Western Australia. It has linear, pinnatiparite leaves with sharply-pointed lobes, yellow flowers in heads of about forty and relatively small follicles.

== Description ==
Banksia meganotia is a shrub that typically grows to a height of 0.3–1 m (1 ft 0 in – 3 ft 3 in) and forms a lignotuber. It has linear, pinnatipartite leaves that are 30–70 mm (1.2–2.8 in) long and 10–25 mm (0.39–0.98 in) wide on a petiole 5–10 mm (0.20–0.39 in) long with between six and ten sharply-pointer, linear lobes on each side. The flowers are yellow and arranged in a head with egg-shaped to lance-shaped involucral bracts 17–20 mm (0.67–0.79 in) long at the base of the head. The flowers have a perianth 22–23 mm (0.87–0.91 in) long and a hairy pistil 26–30 mm (1.0–1.2 in) long. Flowering occurs in October and the follicles that follow flowering are about 5 mm (0.20 in) long.

== Taxonomy and naming ==
This species was first formally described in 1996 by Alex George in the journal Nuytsia from specimens he collected in the Dongolocking Nature Reserve, and was given the name Dryandra meganotia. In 2007, Austin Mast and Kevin Thiele transferred all the dryandras to the genus Banksia and this species became Banksia meganotia. The specific epithet (meganotia) is from ancient Greek words meaning "large" and "southern" referring to the Great Southern region of Western Australia, where this species occurs.

== Distribution and habitat ==
Banksia meganotia mainly grows in kwongan between Kulin and Nyabing in the Avon Wheatbelt and Mallee biogeographic regions.

== Ecology ==
An assessment of the potential impact of climate change on this species found that it was likely to be driven to extinction by loss of habitat by 2080, even under mild climate change scenarios.

== Conservation status ==
This banksia is classified as "Priority Three" by the Government of Western Australia Department of Parks and Wildlife meaning that it is poorly known and known from only a few locations but is not under imminent threat.
