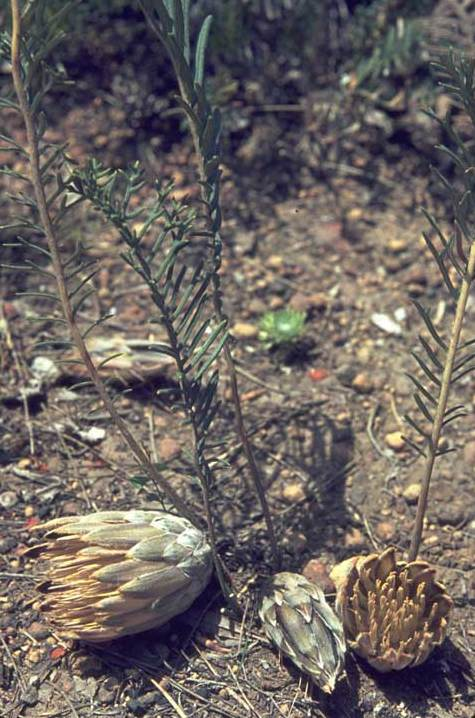
- At Red Hill

Scientific classification
- Kingdom: Plantae
- Clade: Tracheophytes
- Clade: Angiosperms
- Clade: Eudicots
- Order: Proteales
- Family: Proteaceae
- Genus: Banksia
- Subgenus: Banksia subg. Banksia
- Series: Banksia ser. Dryandra
- Species: B. bipinnatifida

Binomial name
- Banksia bipinnatifida (R.Br.) A.R.Mast & K.R.Thiele

Subspecies
- B. b. subsp. bipinnatifida; B. b. subsp. multifida

Synonyms
- Dryandra bipinnatifida R.Br.; Josephia bipinnatifida (R.Br.) Kuntze

= Banksia bipinnatifida =

Species of shrub endemic to Western Australia

Banksia bipinnatifida is a species of shrub that is endemic to Western Australia. It is a prostrate shrub with a lignotuber, an underground stem, only a few divided leaves, large cream-coloured to pale yellow flowers and large fruit.

== Description ==
Banksia bipinnatifida is a prostrate shrub with a lignotuber, an underground stem and only a few above-ground leaves. The leaves are bipinnatipartite, meaning that they are deeply lobed, the lobes themselves lobed, giving the impression of a bipinnate leaf. Each leaf is 70–330 mm (2.8–13.0 in) long and 30–70 mm (1.2–2.8 in) wide in outline, the lobes linear in shape, about 50 mm (2.0 in) long and the secondary lobes up to 17 mm (0.67 in) long. The edges of the leaflets are rolled under and hairy on the lower surface. The flower spikes develop on the ends of the underground stem with thirty for forty-five flowers in each spike, each flower surrounded by bracts 45–80 mm (1.8–3.1 in) long. The perianth is pink and cream-coloured to pale yellow, 40–57 mm (1.6–2.2 in) long and the pistil is 43–60 mm (1.7–2.4 in) long. Flowering occurs from October to November and the fruit is an egg-shaped follicle 17–23 mm (0.67–0.91 in) long and 13–17 mm (0.51–0.67 in) wide.

== Taxonomy ==
Specimens of this species were first collected by Charles Fraser near the Swan River during the Stirling expedition of 1827. A formal description was published in 1830 by Robert Brown, who named it Dryandra bipinnatifida and published the description in the supplement to his Prodromus Florae Novae Hollandiae et Insulae Van Diemen. The specific epithet is a Latinised form of the word "bipinnatifid", in reference to the bipinnate appearance of the leaves. In 2007 Austin Mast and Kevin Thiele transferred all dryandras to the genus Banksia.

In 1996, Alex George described two subspecies in the journal Nuytsia. Mast and Thiels also transferred these to Banksia and the names are accepted by the Australian Plant Census:

- Banksia bipinnatifida subsp. bipinnatifida has a perianth 48–57 mm (1.9–2.2 in) long and leaf lobes more than 1 mm (0.039 in) wide;
- Banksia bipinnatifida subsp. multifida has a perianth 42–45 mm (1.7–1.8 in) long and leaf lobes less than 1 mm (0.039 in) wide.

== Distribution and habitat ==
Banksia bipinnatifida occurs south from Eneabba and Mount Lesueur south to Manjimup and Busselton. Subspecies bipinnatifida grows in jarrah (Eucalyptus marginata) forest and woodland from east of Perth to Manjimup and subspecies multifida is found in kwongan in the northern part of the species' distribution.
