= Platysace maxwellii =

Scientific classification
- Kingdom: Plantae
- Clade: Tracheophytes
- Clade: Angiosperms
- Clade: Eudicots
- Clade: Asterids
- Order: Apiales
- Family: Apiaceae
- Genus: Platysace
- Species: P. maxwellii

Binomial name
- Platysace maxwellii (F.Muell.) C.Norman

Species of plant

Platysace maxwellii, commonly known as native potato or karno, is a shrub that is endemic to Western Australia. The Noongar names for the plant are karno and yook, with the latter name also referring to the closely related species Platysace deflexa which grows further south.

The shrub has a slender, erst to straggling habit and typically grows to a height of 0.3 to 1.2 metres (1 to 4 ft). It blooms between October and April producing white flowers. Found on plains and hills with a scattered distribution from the Mid West through the Wheatbelt and into the south west of the Goldfields-Esperance region of Western Australia where it grows in sandy, loamy, clay or lateritic soils.

Initially described by the botanist Ferdinand von Mueller in 1892 as Trachymene maxwellii in the article Descriptions of new Australian plants, with occasional other annotations in the journal The Victorian Naturalist It was later reclassified into the Platysace genera in 1939 by C. Norman in the Journal of Botany, British and Foreign

Aboriginals used the plant as a food source since it produces large numbers of round tubers about 0.5 metres (1.6 ft) underground which are accessed using a digging stick. The younger tubers closest to the surface are preferred and can be eaten raw or roasted over a fire.
