= Banksia plumosa subsp. plumosa =

Scientific classification
- Kingdom: Plantae
- Clade: Tracheophytes
- Clade: Angiosperms
- Clade: Eudicots
- Order: Proteales
- Family: Proteaceae
- Genus: Banksia
- Species: B. plumosa (R.Br.) A.R.Mast & K.R.Thiele
- Subspecies: B. p. subsp. plumosa

Trinomial name
- Banksia plumosa subsp. plumosa

Synonyms
- Dryandra plumosa R.Br. subsp. plumosa

Subspecies of shrub

Banksia plumosa subsp. plumosa is a subspecies of Banksia plumosa. As an autonym, it is defined as encompassing the type material of the species. It was known as Dryandra plumosa subsp. plumosa until 2007, when Austin Mast and Kevin Thiele sunk all Dryandra into Banksia. As with other members of Banksia ser. Dryandra, it is endemic to the South West Botanical Province of Western Australia.
