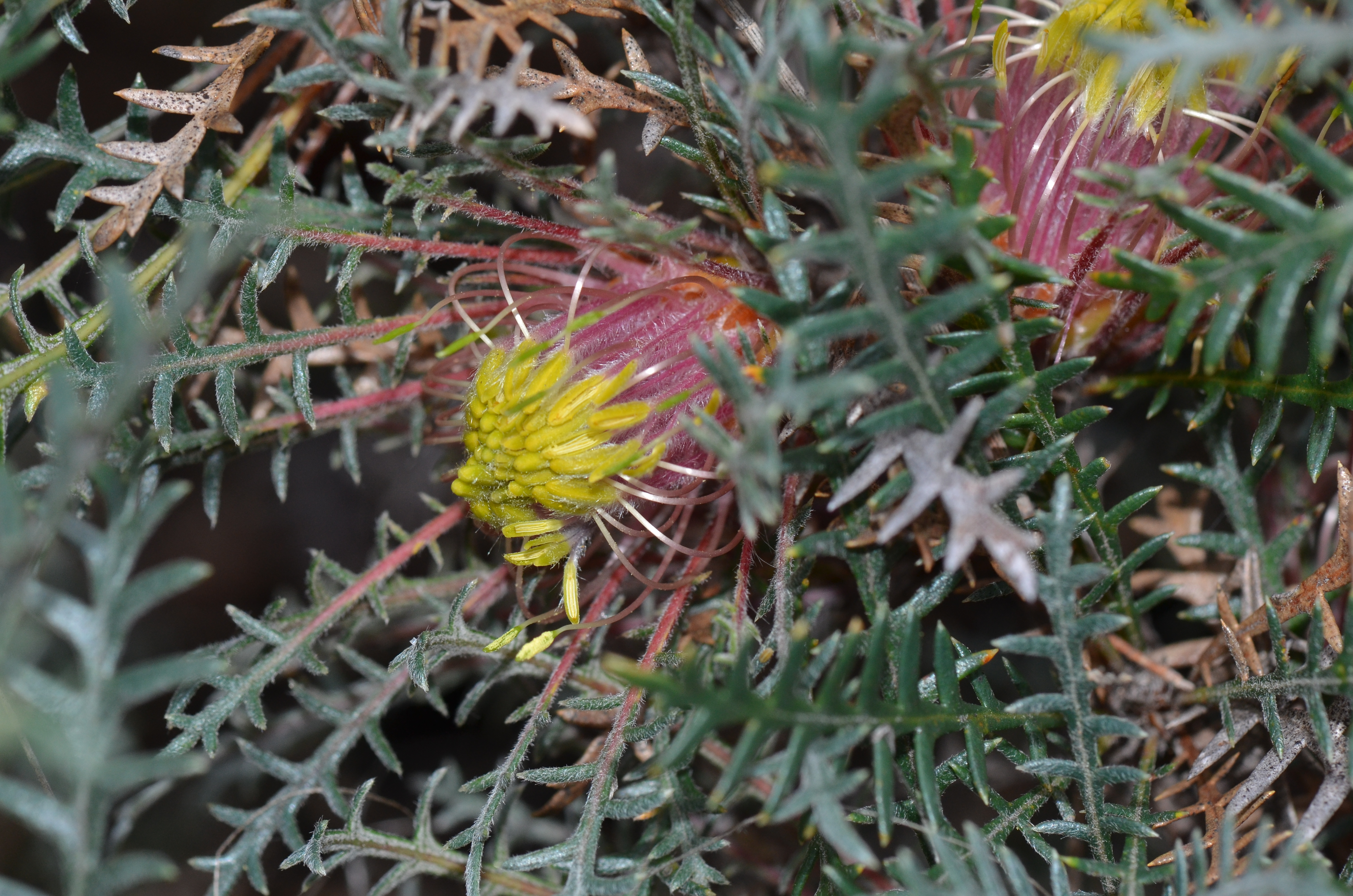

Conservation status
- Vulnerable (EPBC Act)

Scientific classification
- Kingdom: Plantae
- Clade: Tracheophytes
- Clade: Angiosperms
- Clade: Eudicots
- Order: Proteales
- Family: Proteaceae
- Genus: Banksia
- Species: B. serratuloides (Meisn.) A.R.Mast & K.R.Thiele
- Subspecies: B. s. subsp. serratuloides

Trinomial name
- Banksia serratuloides subsp. serratuloides

Synonyms
- Dryandra serratuloides Meisn. subsp. serratuloides

= Banksia serratuloides subsp. serratuloides =

Subspecies of shrub

Banksia serratuloides subsp. serratuloides is a subspecies of Banksia serratuloides. As an autonym, it is defined as encompassing the type material of the species. It was known as Dryandra serratuloides subsp. serratuloides until 2007, when Austin Mast and Kevin Thiele sunk all Dryandra into Banksia. As with other members of Banksia ser. Dryandra, it is endemic to the South West Botanical Province of Western Australia.
