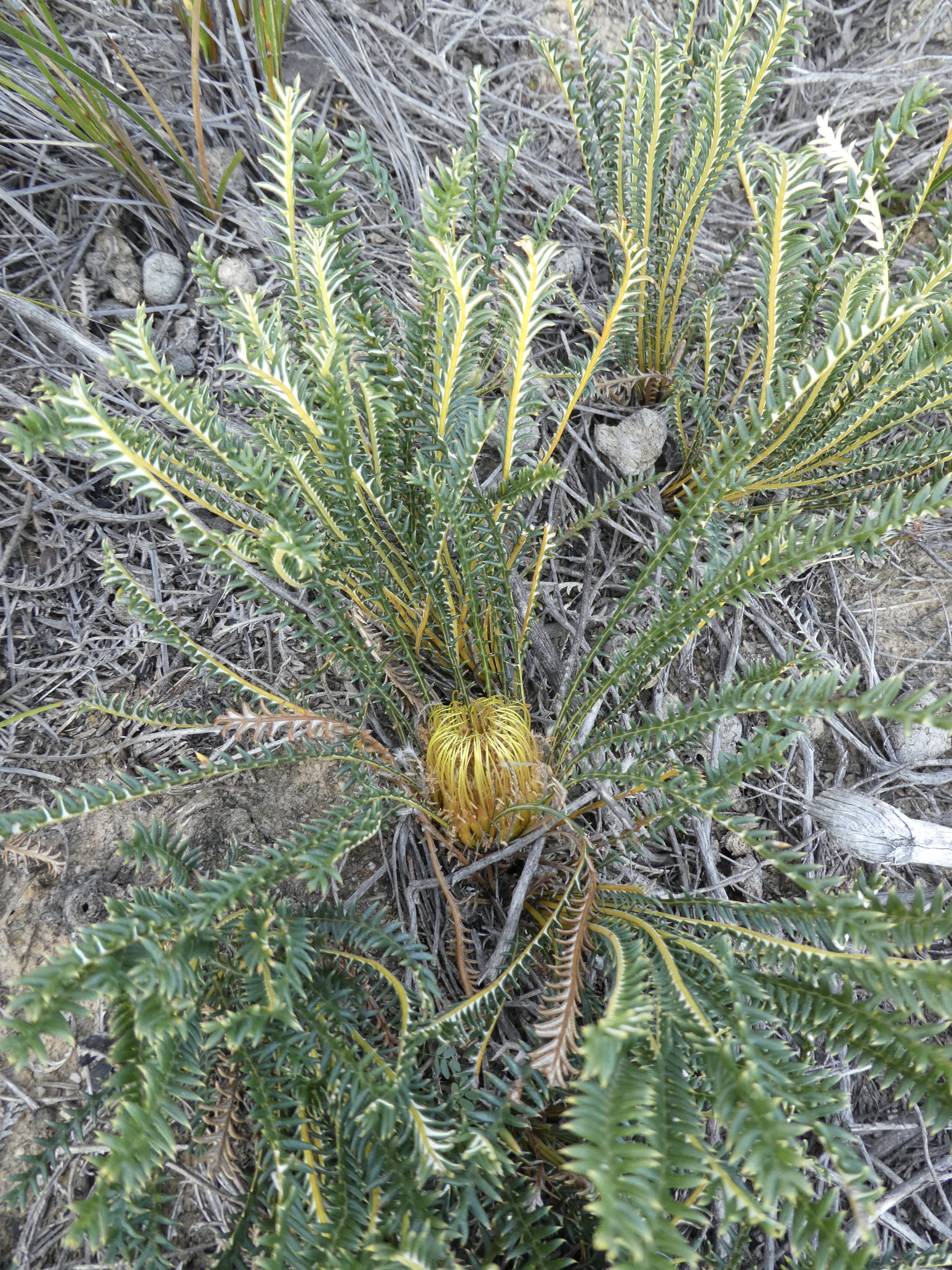
- Near Ravensthorpe

Scientific classification
- Kingdom: Plantae
- Clade: Tracheophytes
- Clade: Angiosperms
- Clade: Eudicots
- Order: Proteales
- Family: Proteaceae
- Genus: Banksia
- Subgenus: Banksia subg. Banksia
- Series: Banksia ser. Dryandra
- Species: B. arctotidis

Binomial name
- Banksia arctotidis (R.Br.) A.R.Mast & K.R.Thiele

Synonyms
- Dryandra arctotidis R.Br.; Dryandra arctotidis R.Br. var. arctotidis; Josephia arctotides Kuntze orth. var.; Josephia arctotidis (R.Br.) Kuntze

= Banksia arctotidis =

Species of shrub endemic to Western Australia

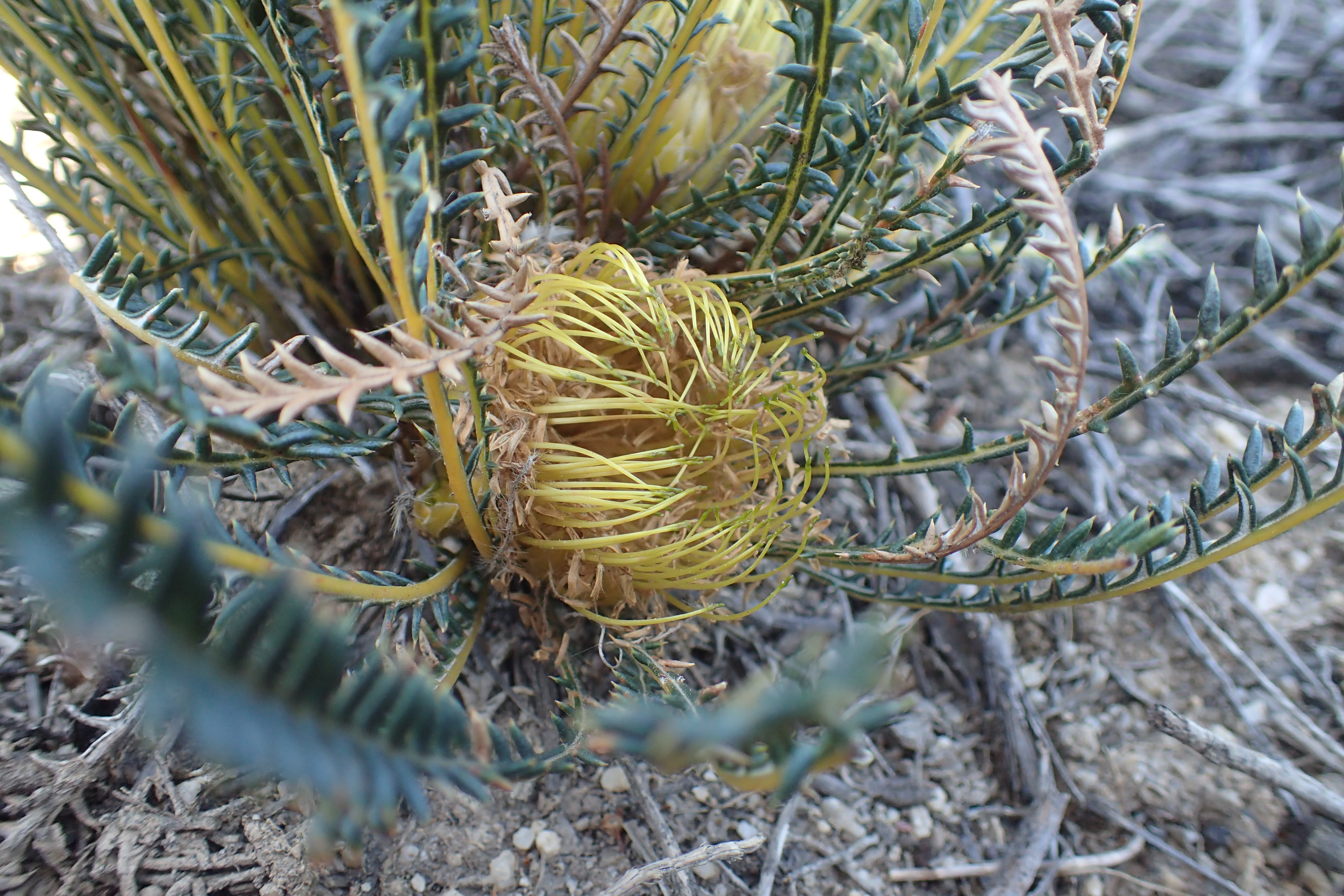
Flower detail

Banksia arctotidis is a species of prostrate shrub that is endemic to the southwest of Western Australia. It has leaves that are pinnately divided to the midrib, cream-coloured flowers and hairy, egg-shaped fruit.

== Description ==
Banksia arctotidis is a prostrate shrub that typically grows to a height of 0.5–1 m (1 ft 8 in – 3 ft 3 in), width of 0.7 m (2 ft 4 in) and has a short underground stem. The leaves are linear, 80–150 mm (3.1–5.9 in) long and 5–8 mm (0.20–0.31 in) wide, pinnately divided to the midrib with between 25 and 45 sharply pointed lobes on each side. The flower spikes are surrounded by hairy thread-like, egg-shaped and oblong bracts and are composed of between 75 and 100 individual flowers. The perianth is 26–31 mm (1.0–1.2 in) long and yellow cream-coloured or yellowish brown. Flowering occurs between September and October and the fruit is a partly hairy, egg-shaped follicle 10–14 mm (0.39–0.55 in) long.

== Taxonomy and naming ==
This banksia was first formally described in 1830 by Robert Brown who gave it the name Dryandra arctotidis and published the description in Supplementum primum Prodromi florae Novae Hollandiae. In 2007, Austin Mast and Kevin Thiele changed the name to Banksia arctotidis. The specific epithet (arctotidis) is a reference to the genus Arctotis.

== Distribution and habitat ==
Banksia arctotidis grows on sandy soil in kwongan south from Kojonup and Ongerup through the Stirling Range National Park to near Albany.

== Ecology ==
An assessment of the potential impact of climate change on this species found that its range is likely to contract by between 50% and 80% by 2080, depending on the severity of the change.

== Conservation status ==
This banksia is classified as "not threatened" by the Western Australian Government Department of Parks and Wildlife.
