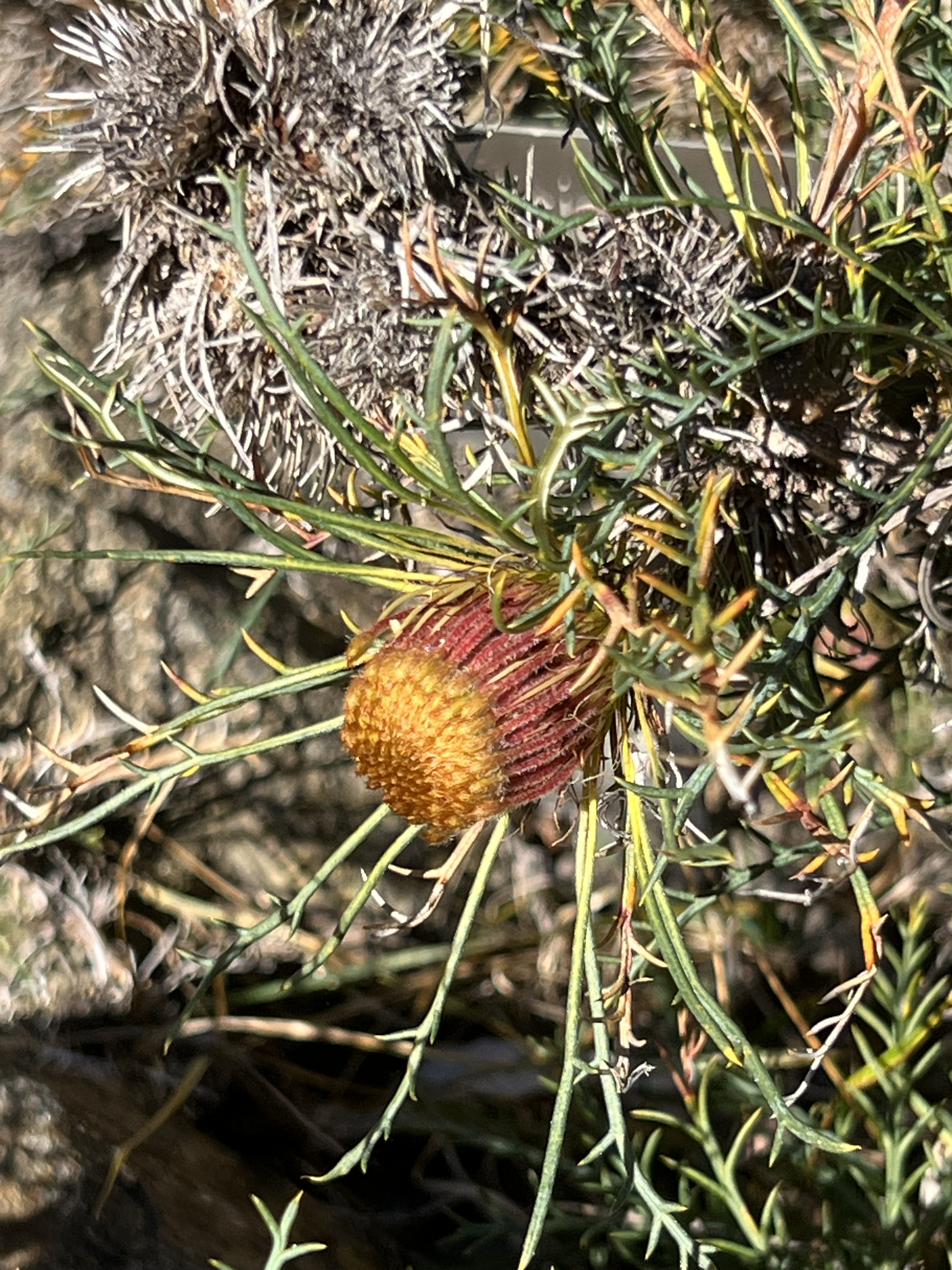

Scientific classification
- Kingdom: Plantae
- Clade: Tracheophytes
- Clade: Angiosperms
- Clade: Eudicots
- Order: Proteales
- Family: Proteaceae
- Genus: Banksia
- Species: B. fraseri (R.Br.) A.R.Mast & K.R.Thiele
- Variety: B. f. var. fraseri

Trinomial name
- Banksia fraseri var. fraseri

Synonyms
- Dryandra fraseri R.Br. var. fraseri

= Banksia fraseri var. fraseri =

Variety of plant found in Australia

Banksia fraseri var. fraseri is a variety of Banksia fraseri. As an autonym, it is defined as encompassing the type material of the species. It was known as Dryandra fraseri var. fraseri until 2007, when Austin Mast and Kevin Thiele sunk all Dryandra into Banksia. As with other members of Banksia ser. Dryandra, it is endemic to the South West Botanical Province of Western Australia.
