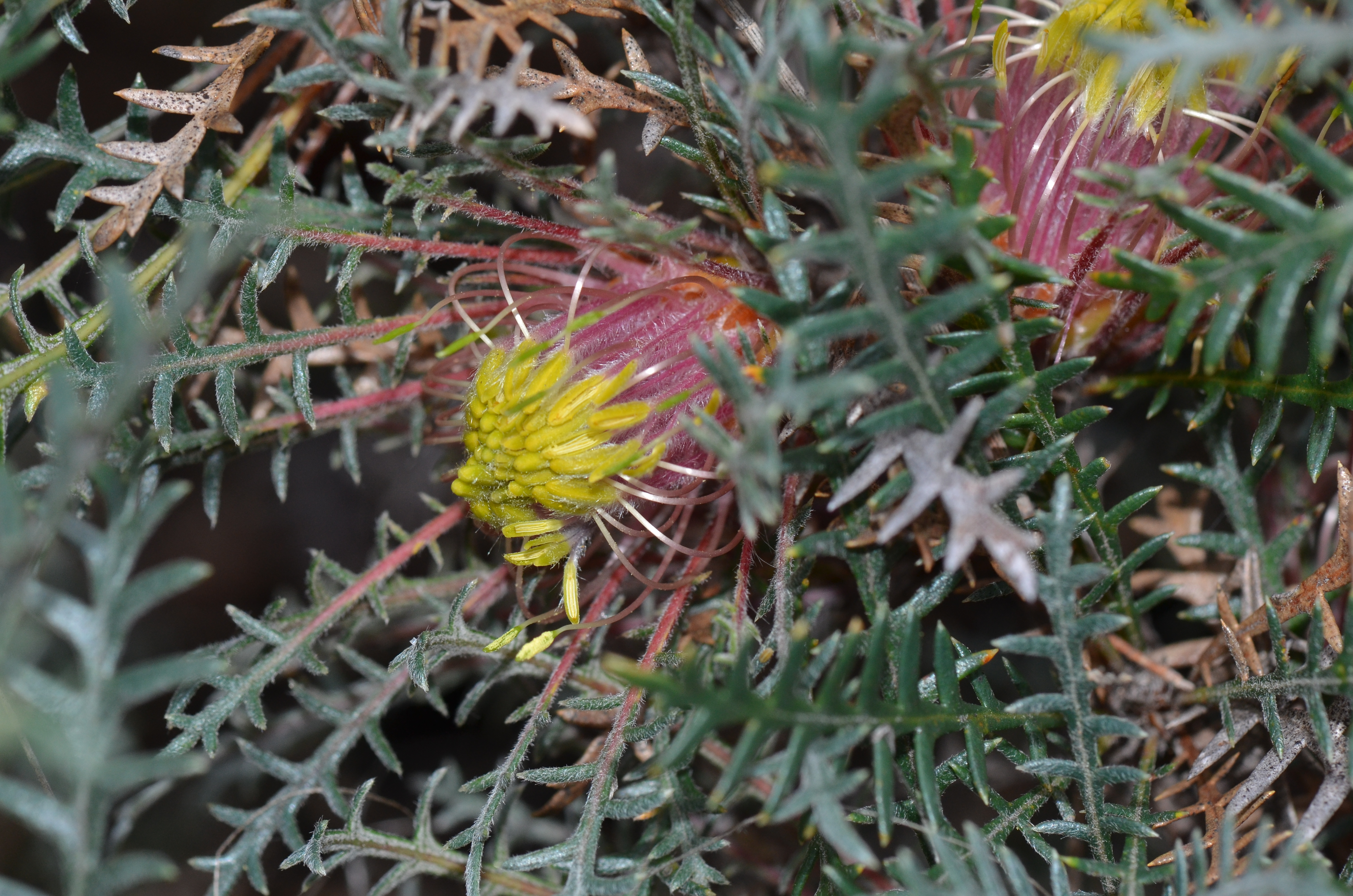

Scientific classification
- Kingdom: Plantae
- Clade: Tracheophytes
- Clade: Angiosperms
- Clade: Eudicots
- Order: Proteales
- Family: Proteaceae
- Genus: Banksia
- Subgenus: Banksia subg. Banksia
- Series: Banksia ser. Dryandra
- Species: B. serratuloides

Binomial name
- Banksia serratuloides (Meisn.) A.R.Mast & K.R.Thiele

Synonyms
- Dryandra serratuloides Meisn.; Josephia serratulodes Kuntze orth. var.; Josephia serratuloides (Meisn.) Kuntze

= Banksia serratuloides =

Species of shrub endemic to Western Australia

Banksia serratuloides is a species of small shrub that is endemic to Western Australia. It has linear, pinnatipartite leaves, yellow and pink flowers in heads of about forty and hairy, wrinkled follicles.

== Description ==
Banksia serratuloides is a shrub that typically grows to a height of 50 cm (20 in) and forms a lignotuber. It has hairy stems and leaves that are linear, pinnatipartite, 30–90 mm (1.2–3.5 in) long and 7–15 mm (0.28–0.59 in) wide on a petiole 10–20 mm (0.39–0.79 in) long. There are between six and fifteen or between twenty and thirty-three (depending on subspecies) triangular to lance-shaped lobes on each side of the leaves. Between thirty-five and forty yellow flowers are arranged in heads with egg-shaped to lance-shaped, shining brown involucral bracts 11–25 mm (0.43–0.98 in) long at the base of each head. The perianth is 19–23 mm (0.75–0.91 in) long and pink at the base, and the pistil is 22–29 mm (0.87–1.14 in) long and pink. Flowering occurs from July to September and the follicles are elliptical, 5–6 mm (0.20–0.24 in) long, wrinkled and densely hairy.

== Taxonomy and naming ==
This species was first formally described in 1855 by Carl Meissner who gave it the name Dryandra serratuloides and published the description in Hooker's Journal of Botany and Kew Garden Miscellany from specimens collected by James Drummond. The specific epithet (serratuloides) refers to the similarity of this species to species in the genus Serratula.

In 1996, Alex George described two subspecies in the journal Nuytsia:

- Dryandra serratuloides subsp. perissa has leaves with between six and twelve lobes on each side, and inner bracts 11–20 mm (0.43–0.79 in) long;
- Dryandra serratuloides subsp. serratuloides has leaves with between twenty and thirty-three lobes on each side, and inner bracts 22–25 mm (0.87–0.98 in) long.

In 2007 Austin Mast and Kevin Thiele transferred all dryandras to the genus Banksia and renamed the species Banksia serratuloides and the subspecies perissa and serratuloides respectively. The names B. serratuloides subsp. perissa and B. serratuloides subsp. serratuloides are accepted by the Australian Plant Census.

== Distribution and habit ==
Banksia serratuloides grows in kwongan or open shrubland and occurs in two disjunct areas between Eneabba and Mogumber. Subspecies perissa is found between Alexander Morrison National Park, Badgingarra and Boothendarra Hill. Subspecies serratuloides occurs near Gillingarra and Mogumber.

== Conservation status ==
Banksia serratuloides is classified as "not threatened" by the Western Australian Government Department of Parks and Wildlife, but both subspecies are listed as "Threatened Flora (Declared Rare Flora — Extant)" by the Department of Environment and Conservation (Western Australia).
