= Banksia bipinnatifida subsp. bipinnatifida =

Scientific classification
- Kingdom: Plantae
- Clade: Tracheophytes
- Clade: Angiosperms
- Clade: Eudicots
- Order: Proteales
- Family: Proteaceae
- Genus: Banksia
- Species: B. bipinnatifida (R.Br.) A.R.Mast & K.R.Thiele
- Subspecies: B. b. subsp. bipinnatifida

Trinomial name
- Banksia bipinnatifida subsp. bipinnatifida

Synonyms
- Dryandra bipinnatifida R.Br. subsp. bipinnatifida

Subspecies of plant found in Australia

Banksia bipinnatifida subsp. bipinnatifida is a subspecies of Banksia bipinnatifida. As an autonym, it is defined as encompassing the type material of the species. It was known as Dryandra bipinnatifida subsp. bipinnatifida until 2007, when Austin Mast and Kevin Thiele sunk all Dryandra into Banksia. As with other members of Banksia ser. Dryandra, it is endemic to the South West Botanical Province of Western Australia.
