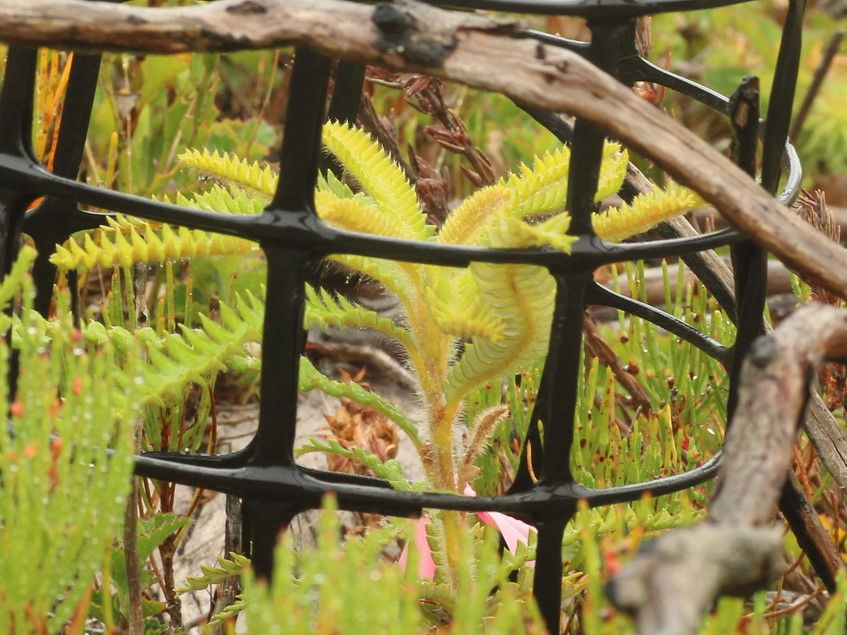

Conservation status
- Critically endangered (EPBC Act)

Scientific classification
- Kingdom: Plantae
- Clade: Embryophytes
- Clade: Tracheophytes
- Clade: Spermatophytes
- Clade: Angiosperms
- Clade: Eudicots
- Order: Proteales
- Family: Proteaceae
- Genus: Banksia
- Subgenus: Banksia subg. Banksia
- Series: Banksia ser. Dryandra
- Species: B. montana

Binomial name
- Banksia montana (C.A.Gardner ex A.S.George) A.R.Mast & K.R.Thiele

Synonyms
- Dryandra montana C.A.Gardner ex A.S.George; Dryandra sp. 'Stirling Range' (F.Lullfitz 3379)

= Banksia montana =

Stirling Range dryandra

Species of shrub endemic to Western Australia

Banksia montana, commonly known as the Stirling Range dryandra, is a species of shrub that is endemic to the Stirling Range in Western Australia. It has hairy stems, linear pinnatisect leaves with twisted, triangular lobes, yellow flowers in heads of about sixty and reddish-brown follicles.

== Description ==
Banksia montana grows as a shrub to 2.5 m (8 ft 2 in) high but does not form a lignotuber. Its stems are covered in short, rust-coloured hairs. The leaves linear, pinnatisect, 80–250 mm (3.1–9.8 in) long and 6–11 mm (0.24–0.43 in) wide with between thirty-five and sixty lobes on each side. The lobes are twisted and curved, so that the undersurface faces the apex of the leaf. The flowers are yellow and arranged in head of between fifty and sixty on a branchlet one or two years old with linear to lance-shaped involucral bracts about 15 mm (0.59 in) long at the base of the head. The perianth is 17–19 mm (0.67–0.75 in) long and hairy, the pistil 18–21 mm (0.71–0.83 in) long and curved. Flowering occurs from December or January to February and the follicles are dark reddish-brown, egg-shaped and 9–11 mm (0.35–0.43 in) long and sparsely hairy. The follicles remain on the plant for up to four years before disintegrating.

== Taxonomy ==
The type specimen was collected by Ken Newbey from Bluff Knoll in the Stirling Range on 14 January 1966. Western Australian State botanist Charles Austin Gardner coined the name Dryandra montana but did not publish it. The species was first formally described as D. montana in 1996 by Alex George in the journal Nuytsia. In 2007, Austin Mast and Kevin Thiele transferred all the dryandras to the genus Banksia and this species became Banksia montana. The specific epithet (montana) is from the Latin word montanus meaning "pertaining to mountains" referring to the habitat of this banksia.

== Distribution and habitat ==
Banksia montana is found only on the upper slopes of Bluff Knoll above 900 m (3000 ft) altitude, on sandstone, metamorphosed sandstone or siltstone. It is a component of the endangered Eastern Stirling Range Montane Heath and Thicket Threatened Ecological Community. Four populations containing a total of 45 adult and 16 juvenile plants were known in 2004.

== Ecology ==
Stirling Range dryandra is killed by bushfire and regenerates from seed. Taking up to nine years to flower and fruit from seed, it is thought to require bushfires at intervals of 18 years for best recovery. However, two fires in quick succession in its native habitat killed many plants with little recruitment. The species is also highly sensitive to dieback (Phytophthora cinnamomi), which has infested three of four extant populations.

A species of mealybug, Pseudococcus markharveyi, was discovered on its leaves, and is possibly only associated with this species, making it likely to be endangered as well.

== Conservation status ==
Banksia montana was classified as "endangered" under the Australian Government Environment Protection and Biodiversity Conservation Act 1999 and a recovery plan (for Dryandra montana) has been prepared. It is also classified as "Threatened Flora (Declared Rare Flora — Extant)" by the Department of Environment and Conservation (Western Australia). The main threats to the species are habitat loss due to Phytophthora cinnamomi infestation and inappropriate fire regimes. As of October 2022, it is listed as "critically endangered" under the EPBC Act.

== Use in horticulture ==
Stirling Range dryandra has been grown successfully in containers at Kings Park in Perth and at the Banksia Farm at Mount Barker.
