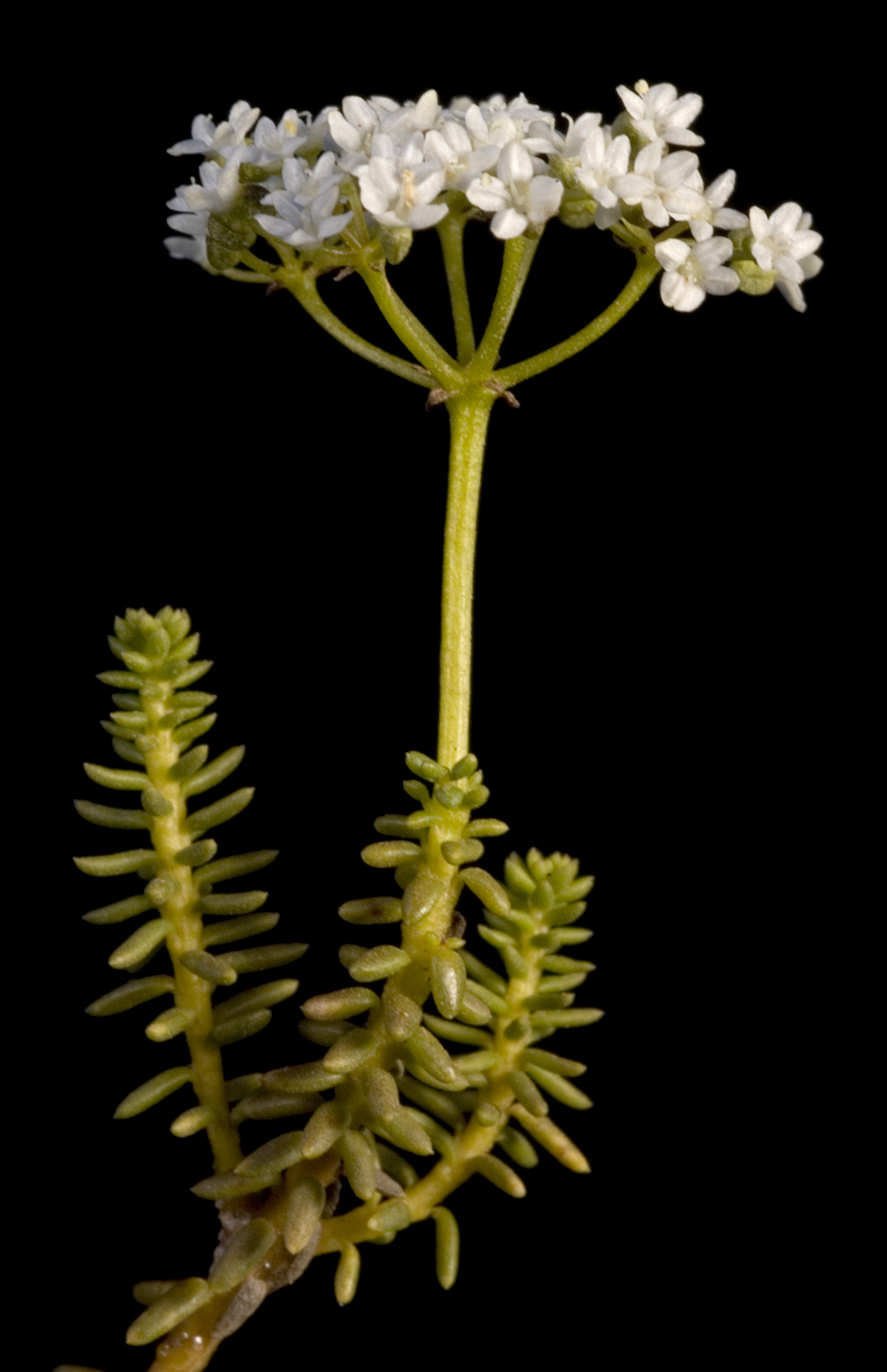

Scientific classification
- Kingdom: Plantae
- Clade: Tracheophytes
- Clade: Angiosperms
- Clade: Eudicots
- Clade: Asterids
- Order: Apiales
- Family: Apiaceae
- Genus: Platysace
- Species: P. deflexa

Binomial name
- Platysace deflexa (Turcz.) C.Norman

= Platysace deflexa =

Species of shrub

Platysace deflexa, known by its Noongar name youlk or as Ravensthorpe radish, is a species of flowering plant in the family Apiaceae and is endemic to the south-west of Western Australia. It is a tuberous, perennial herb or shrub with linear leaves and white flowers in a compound umbel.

== Description ==
Platysace deflexa is a tuberous, perennial herb or shrub that typically grows to a height of 20–50 cm (7.9–19.7 in) and has wand-like branches. Its leaves are broadly lance-shaped to linear, usually 2–4 mm (0.079–0.157 in) long, the upper leaves almost round. White flowers are borne in compound umbels with 3 to 6 rays on a long, thin peduncle, each ray with a partial umbel. Flowering occurs from December to January and the fruit is very flat and about 2 mm (0.079 in) long and ribbed.

== Taxonomy ==
This species was first formally described in 1849 by Nikolai Turczaninow who gave it the name Trachymene deflexa in the journal Bulletin de la Société Impériale des Naturalistes de Moscou from specimens collected by James Drummond. In 1939, Cecil Norman transferred the species to Platysace as P. deflexa in the Journal of Botany, British and Foreign. The specific epithet (deflexa) means turned downwards, referring to the inflorescence.

== Distribution and habitat ==
Youlk grows in sandy, loamy or gravelly soils on plains and ridges in the Avon Wheatbelt, Coolgardie, Esperance Plains, Jarrah Forest and Mallee bioregions of south-western Western Australia.

== Uses ==
Platysace deflexa is similar to the related Platysace maxwellii which grows in areas further north, and the edible tubers of the plant are a traditional food source of the indigenous Noongar people of Western Australia. The tubers can be harvested throughout the year and, similarly to sweet potato, the plant will continue to grow more as long as the main plant and suckers aren't over-harvested. Youlk tubers can be used similarly to potatoes, with a crisp texture. Some commercial growers have begun experimenting with growing youlk on a commercial basis, including indigenous community-run businesses. As of 2019, youlk plants are also available for purchase from garden centres in Western Australia.
