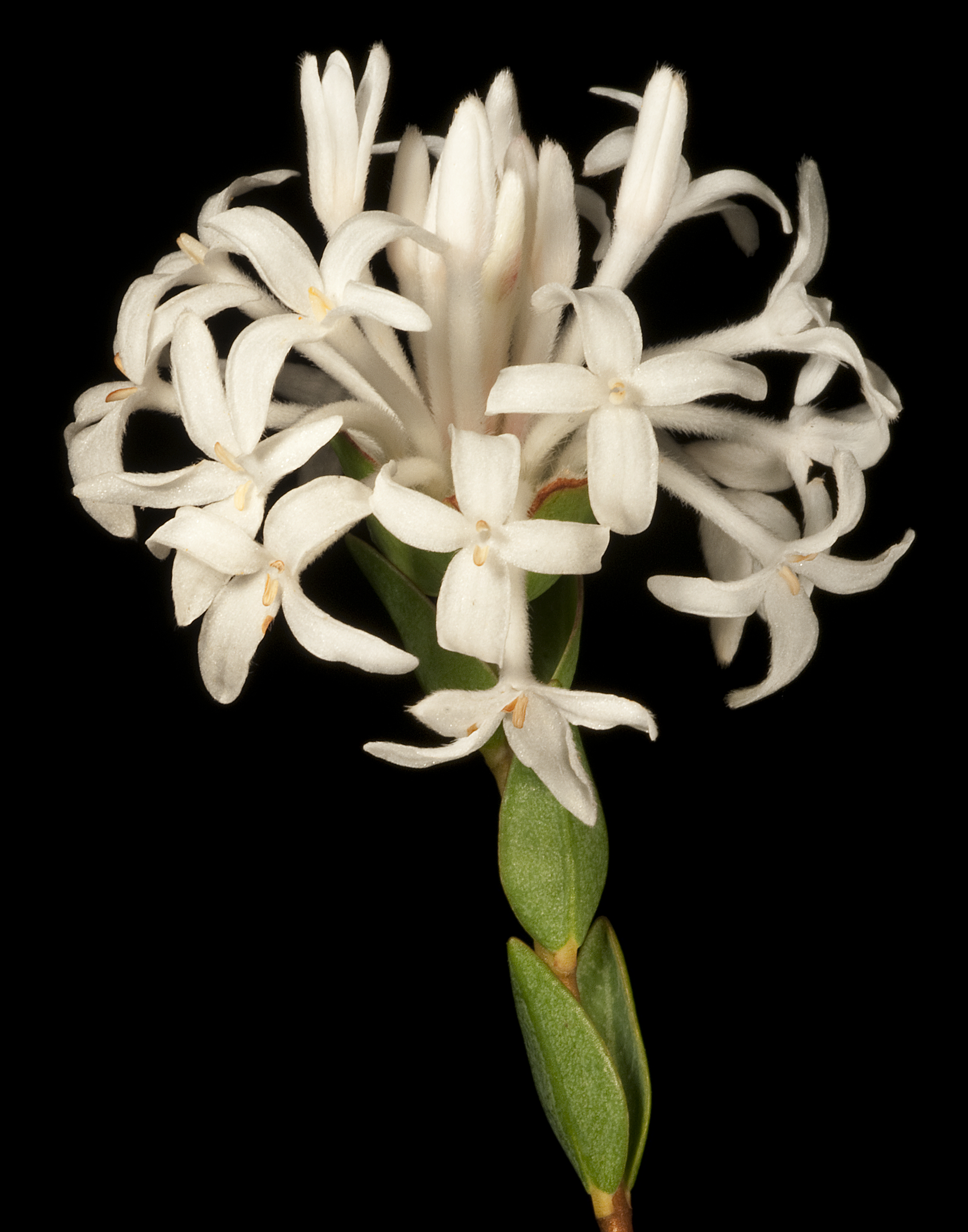

Scientific classification
- Kingdom: Plantae
- Clade: Tracheophytes
- Clade: Angiosperms
- Clade: Eudicots
- Clade: Rosids
- Order: Malvales
- Family: Thymelaeaceae
- Genus: Pimelea
- Species: P. preissii

Binomial name
- Pimelea preissii Meisn.

= Pimelea preissii =

Species of flowering plant

Pimelea preissii is a species of flowering plant in the family Thymelaeaceae and is endemic to the southwest of Western Australia. It is an erect, spreading shrub with narrowly elliptic leaves arranged in opposite pairs, and compact clusters of many white or pink flowers surrounded by 4 green, egg-shaped involucral bracts.

== Description ==
Pimelea preissii is an erect, spreading shrub that typically grows to a height of 8–70 cm (3.1–27.6 in) and has glabrous stems. The leaves are arranged in opposite pairs, glabrous and narrowly elliptic, 5–20 mm (0.20–0.79 in) long and 2–7 mm (0.079–0.276 in) wide on a short petiole. The flowers are arranged in compact clusters of many white or pink flowers, surrounded by 4 green involucral bracts 6–14 mm (0.24–0.55 in) long and 4–10 mm (0.16–0.39 in) wide. The flower tube is 10–16 mm (0.39–0.63 in) long and the sepals 3–5 mm (0.12–0.20 in) long, the stamens shorter than the sepals. Flowering occurs from September to December.

== Taxonomy ==
Pimelea preissii was first formally described in 1845 by Carl Meissner in Lehmann's Plantae Preissianae. The specific epithet (preissii) honours Ludwig Preiss.

== Distribution and habitat ==
This pimelea mainly grows in woodland and forest between Wooroloo, Cape Leeuwin and the Bow River in the Avon Wheatbelt, Esperance Plains, Jarrah Forest, Mallee, Swan Coastal Plain and Warren bioregions of south-western Western Australia.

== Conservation status ==
Pimelea preissii is listed as "not threatened" by the Western Australian Government Department of Biodiversity, Conservation and Attractions.
