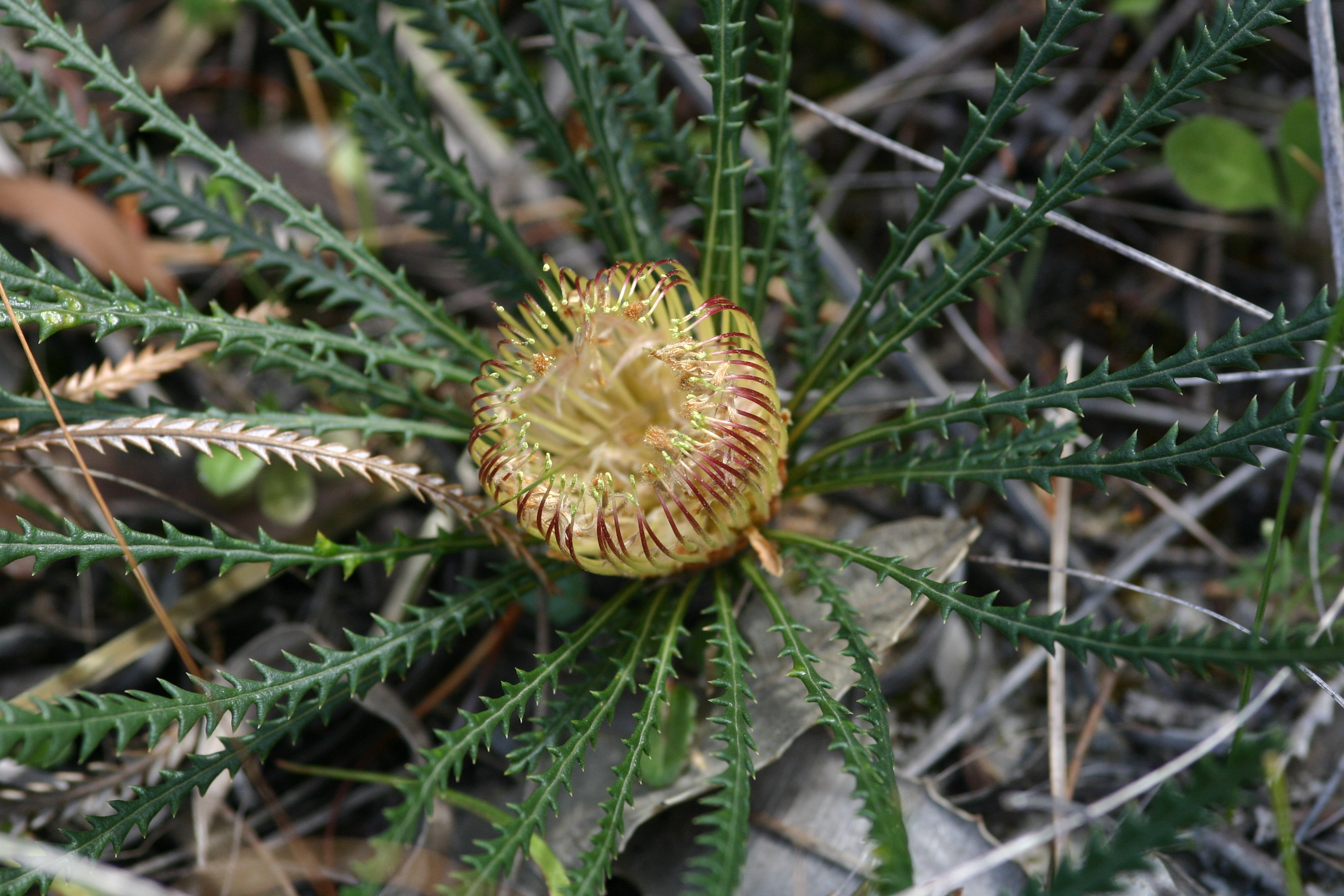
- Banksia dallanneyi at Cottonwood Crescent Reserve, Dianella

Scientific classification
- Kingdom: Plantae
- Clade: Tracheophytes
- Clade: Angiosperms
- Clade: Eudicots
- Order: Proteales
- Family: Proteaceae
- Genus: Banksia
- Subgenus: Banksia subg. Banksia
- Series: Banksia ser. Dryandra
- Species: B. dallanneyi

Binomial name
- Banksia dallanneyi A.R.Mast & K.R.Thiele

Synonyms
- Dryandra lindleyana Meisn.; Dryandra lindleyana Meisn. subsp. lindleyana; Dryandra nivea auct. non (Labill.) R.Br.

= Banksia dallanneyi =

Couch honeypot

Species of shrub endemic to Western Australia

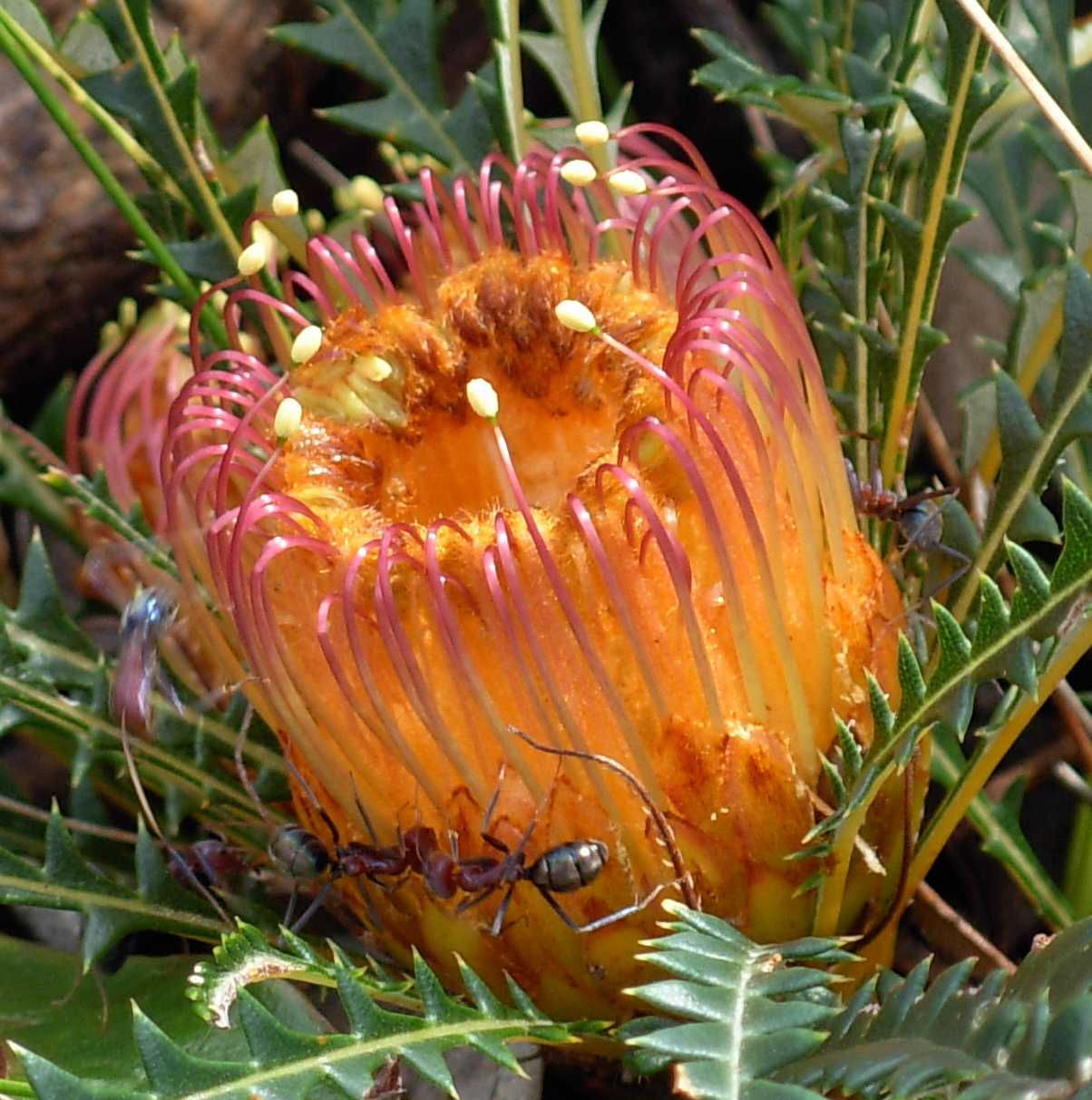
At Kalamunda National Park

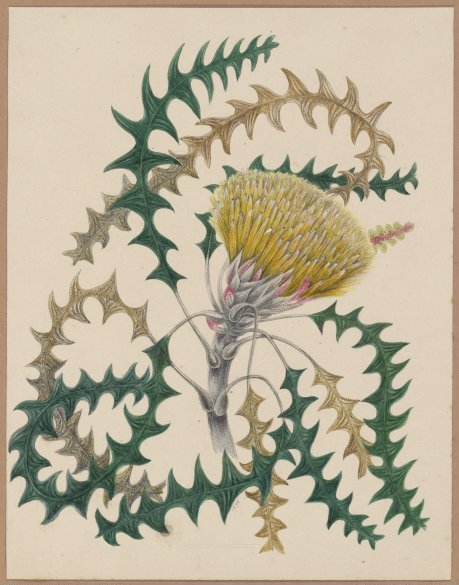
Illustration by Marrianne Collinson Campbell

Banksia dallanneyi, commonly known as couch honeypot, is a species of prostrate shrub that is endemic to Western Australia. It only has a short above-ground stem, pinnatipartite or pinnatisect leaves, between thirty and seventy variously coloured flowers and glabrous, egg-shaped fruit.

== Description ==
Banksia dallanneyi is a shrub that sometimes grows to a height of 0.3 m (1 ft 0 in) and has a fire-tolerant, underground stem and only a short above-ground stem. It has pinnatipartite or pinnatisect leaves that are 60–200 mm (2.4–7.9 in) long and 2–20 mm (0.079–0.787 in) wide on a petiole 10–120 mm (0.39–4.72 in) long. There are between ten and eighty triangular to oblong lobes on each side of the leaves and the lower surface is covered with woolly white hairs. The flowers are arranged in heads of between thirty and seventy with linear to lance-shaped involucral bracts 15–25 mm (0.59–0.98 in) long at the base of the head. The flowers have a cream-coloured, golden yellow or pinkish perianth 20–35 mm (0.79–1.38 in) long and a cream-coloured, pink or maroon pistil 30–40 mm (1.2–1.6 in) long. Flowering occurs from May to October and the fruit is an egg-shaped, mostly glabrous follicle 7–13 mm (0.28–0.51 in) long.

== Taxonomy and naming ==
Couch honeypot was first formally described in 1845 by Carl Meissner as Dryandra lindleyana, published in Lehmann's Plantae Preissianae.

In 1996, Alex George described five subspecies, one subspecies with two varieties:

- Dryandra lindleyana subsp. sylvestris with oblong or linear leaf lobes;
- Dryandra lindleyana subsp. lindleyana with triangular leaf lobes, the leaves divided to, or almost to the mid-vein and 3–10 mm (0.12–0.39 in) wide with thirty to sixty lobes on each side;
  - Dryandra lindleyana var. lindleyana as for subsp. lindleyana but with the above-ground stem less than 10 cm (3.9 in) long;
  - Dryandra lindleyana var. mellicula as for subsp. lindleyana but with the above-ground stem more than 45 cm (18 in) tall;
- Dryandra lindleyana subsp. pollosta with triangular leaf lobes, the leaves divided to, or almost to the mid-vein and 2–3 mm (0.079–0.118 in) wide with sixty to eighty lobes on each side;
- Dryandra lindleyana subsp. media with asymmetrical leaf lobes, the lower margin shallowly S-shaped or dished;
- Dryandra lindleyana subsp. agricola with triangular leaf lobes, the leaves divided 1/2 to 3/4 to the mid-vein.

In 2007, Austin Mast and Kevin Thiele transferred all Dryandra species to Banksia. As there was already a species named Banksia lindleyana (porcupine banksia), Mast and Thiele changed the specific epithet to "dallanneyi", an anagram of "lindleyana".

The changed names of the subspecies and varieties are as follows and are accepted at the Australian Plant Census:

- Banksia dallanneyi subsp. agricola;
- Banksia dallanneyi subsp. dallanneyi;
  - Banksia dallanneyi var. dallanneyi;
  - Banksia dallanneyi var. mellicula;
- Banksia dallanneyi subsp. media;
- Banksia dallanneyi subsp. pollosta;
- Banksia dallanneyi subsp. sylvestris;

== Distribution and habitat ==
Banksia dallanneyi grows on flats and rises in a range of soil types between Geraldton and Albany.

== Ecology ==
An assessment of the potential impact of climate change on this species found that its range is likely to contract by between 30% and 80% by 2080, depending on the severity of the change.
