= Banksia dallanneyi subsp. media =

Scientific classification
- Kingdom: Plantae
- Clade: Tracheophytes
- Clade: Angiosperms
- Clade: Eudicots
- Order: Proteales
- Family: Proteaceae
- Genus: Banksia
- Species: B. dallanneyi
- Subspecies: B. d. subsp. media

Trinomial name
- Banksia dallanneyi subsp. media (A.S.George) A.R.Mast & K.R.Thiele

Synonyms
- Dryandra lindleyana subsp. media A.S.George

Subspecies of prostrate shrub

Banksia dallanneyi subsp. media is a subspecies of Banksia dallanneyi. It was known as Dryandra lindleyana subsp. media until 2007, when Austin Mast and Kevin Thiele sunk all Dryandra into Banksia. Since there was already a Banksia named Banksia lindleyana, Mast and Thiele had to choose a new specific epithet for D. lindleyana and hence for this subspecies of it. As with other members of Banksia ser. Dryandra, it is endemic to the South West Botanical Province of Western Australia.
