= Banksia plumosa =

Scientific classification
- Kingdom: Plantae
- Clade: Tracheophytes
- Clade: Angiosperms
- Clade: Eudicots
- Order: Proteales
- Family: Proteaceae
- Genus: Banksia
- Subgenus: Banksia subg. Banksia
- Series: Banksia ser. Dryandra
- Species: B. plumosa

Binomial name
- Banksia plumosa (R.Br.) A.R.Mast & K.R.Thiele

Synonyms
- Dryandra plumosa R.Br.; Josephia plumosa (R.Br.) Poir.

Species of shrub endemic to Western Australia

Banksia plumosa is a species of shrub that is endemic to Western Australia. It has hairy stems, broadly linear pinnatifid to pinnatipartite leaves with triangular lobes, creamy-yellow flowers in heads of up to eighty, and egg-shaped follicles.

== Description ==
Banksia plumosa is a shrub that typically grows to a height of 2.5 m (8 ft 2 in) and has hairy stems but does not form a lignotuber. It has broadly linear, pinnatifid to pinnatipartite leaves 80–300 mm (3.1–11.8 in) long and 7–18 mm (0.28–0.71 in) wide on a petiole 5–20 mm (0.20–0.79 in) long, with between twenty-five and forty triangular lobes on each side. Between forty-five and eighty creamy-yellow flowers are borne in often clustered heads with hairy, linear involucral bracts up to 30 mm (1.2 in) long at the base of each head. The perianth is 16–20 mm (0.63–0.79 in) long and the pistil 19–27 mm (0.75–1.06 in) long and curved downwards. Flowering occurs from January to December, and the follicles are egg-shaped but curved. Only one to three follicles, 10–15 mm (0.39–0.59 in) long and 7–15 mm (0.28–0.59 in) wide form in each head.

== Taxonomy and naming ==
This species was first formally described in 1810 by Robert Brown who gave it the name Dryandra plumosa and published the description in Transactions of the Linnean Society of London from material collected near Lucky Bay. The specific epithet (plumosa) is from a Latin word meaning "covered with feathers", referring to the bracts.

In 1996, Alex George described two subspecies of Dryandra plumosa in the journal Nuytsia:

- Dryandra plumosa R.Br. subsp. plumosa;
- Dryandra plumosa subsp. denticulata A.S.George that differs from the autonym in having relatively thin, almost pinnatisect leaves with their edges only slightly, rather than prominently turned downwards, and that is only known from the Stirling Range National Park.

In 2007 Austin Mast and Kevin Thiele transferred all dryandras to the genus Banksia and renamed this species Banksia plumosa and the subspecies plumosa and denticulata respectively. The names of the subspecies are accepted by the Australian Plant Census.

== Distribution and habitat ==
Banksia plumosa grows in kwongan, often with mallee eucalypts, between West Mount Barren, Lucky Bay and inland to Chillinup in the Esperance Plains biogeographic region.

== Ecology ==
An assessment of the potential impact of climate change on this species found that its range is likely to contract by between 30% and 80% by 2080, depending on the severity of the change.

== Conservation status ==
Banksia plumosa and B. plumosa subsp. plumosa are listed as "not threatened" by the Western Australian Government Department of Parks and Wildlife but subsp. denticulata is listed as "Priority Four" meaning that is rare or near threatened.
