= Banksia pseudoplumosa =

False plumed-banksia

Conservation status
- Endangered (EPBC Act)

Scientific classification
- Kingdom: Plantae
- Clade: Tracheophytes
- Clade: Angiosperms
- Clade: Eudicots
- Order: Proteales
- Family: Proteaceae
- Genus: Banksia
- Subgenus: Banksia subg. Banksia
- Series: Banksia ser. Dryandra
- Species: B. pseudoplumosa

Binomial name
- Banksia pseudoplumosa (A.S.George) A.R.Mast & K.R.Thiele

Synonyms
- Dryandra pseudoplumosa A.S.George

Species of shrub endemic to Western Australia

Banksia pseudoplumosa, commonly known as false plumed-banksia, is a species of shrub that is endemic to Western Australia. It has hairy stems, broadly linear, pinnatipartite leaves with sharply-pointed triangular lobes on the sides, yellow flowers in heads of about one hundred, and densely woolly-hairy follicles.

== Description ==
Banksia pseudoplumosa is a shrub that typically grows to a height of 1.8 m (5 ft 11 in) but does not form a lignotuber. It has broadly linear, pinnatipartite leaves that are 80–170 mm (3.1–6.7 in) long and 6–15 mm (0.24–0.59 in) wide on a petiole 10–20 mm (0.39–0.79 in) long. There are between fifteen and thirty-one sharply-pointed triangular lobes on each side. Between ninety and one hundred yellow flowers are borne in heads with broadly linear, hairy, tapering involucral bracts up to 20 mm (0.79 in) long at the base of each head. The perianth is 16–18 mm (0.63–0.71 in) long and the pistil 23–25 mm (0.91–0.98 in) long and strongly curved. Flowering occurs from November to December, and the follicles are oblong to egg-shaped and densely woolly-hairy. Only one to three follicles, 16–18 mm (0.63–0.71 in) long, form in each head.

== Taxonomy and naming ==
This species was first formally described in 1996 by Alex George who gave it the name Dryandra pseudoplumosa and published the description in the journal Nuytsia from material collected by Margaret Pieroni near Salt River Road in the Stirling Range National Park. In 2007 Austin Mast and Kevin Thiele transferred all dryandras to the genus Banksia and renamed this species Banksia pseudoplumosa.

== Distribution and habitat ==
False plumed-banksia grows in woodland over heath in the Stirling Range National Park and in patches of remnant vegetation north of Albany. The species is known from seven subpopulations in the Stirling Range National Park and in 2009, the total population was estimated to be about 3,400 plants in an area of 600 km^{2} (230 sq mi) with an occupancy of 0.15 km^{2} (0.058 sq mi).

== Conservation status ==
Banksia pseudoplumosa is classified as "endangered" under the Australian Government Environment Protection and Biodiversity Conservation Act 1999 and as "Threatened Flora (Declared Rare Flora — Extant)" by the Department of Environment and Conservation (Western Australia). The main threats to the species are dieback caused by Phytophthora cinnamomi and inappropriate fire regimes. An interim recovery plan has been prepared by the Government of Western Australia Department of Environment and Conservation.
