= Gillingarra Important Bird Area =

Important bird area in Western Australia

Coordinates: 30°55′07″S 116°04′20″E

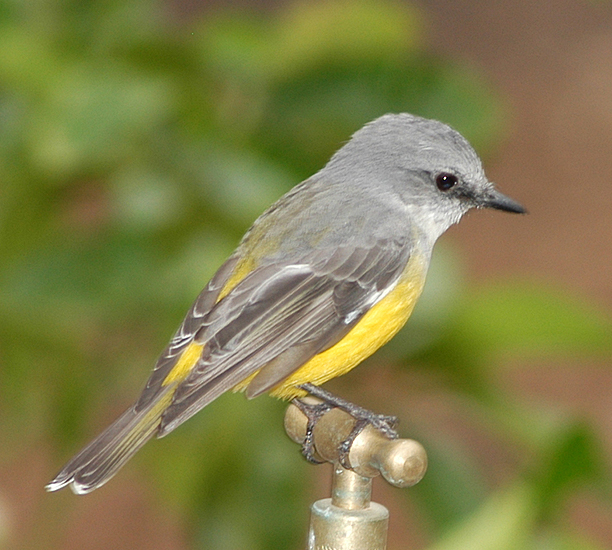
The IBA is an important site for western yellow robins

Gillingarra Important Bird Area is an 83 km^{2} tract of land in the wheatbelt region of Western Australia. It is located near Mogumber and Koogan on the former Midland Railway line.

It includes the nature reserves of Gillingarra and Koodjee with a large area of privately owned farmland. It has been identified by BirdLife International as an Important Bird Area (IBA) because it supports up to 20 breeding pairs of the endangered Carnaby's black-cockatoo which nest in marri trees and feed in native shrublands. It also supports populations of the western corella, red-capped parrot, western spinebill and western yellow robin.

== Description ==
The boundaries of the IBA are defined by areas of suitable nesting habitat and associated feeding habitat for the cockatoos. The site comprises isolated marri paddock trees that provide nesting sites for the cockatoos with a large area of intact proteaceous heath that provide food sources for nesting birds. The area lies at an altitude of 205–240 m above sea level and has a Mediterranean climate.
