= Banksia dallanneyi subsp. dallanneyi =

Scientific classification
- Kingdom: Plantae
- Clade: Tracheophytes
- Clade: Angiosperms
- Clade: Eudicots
- Order: Proteales
- Family: Proteaceae
- Genus: Banksia
- Species: B. dallanneyi A.R.Mast & K.R.Thiele
- Subspecies: B. d. subsp. dallanneyi

Trinomial name
- Banksia dallanneyi subsp. dallanneyi

Synonyms
- Dryandra lindleyana subsp. lindleyana

Subspecies of plant found in Australia

Banksia dallanneyi subsp. dallanneyi is a subspecies of Banksia dallanneyi. It was known as Dryandra lindleyana subsp. lindleyana until 2007, when Austin Mast and Kevin Thiele sunk all Dryandra into Banksia. Since the name Banksia lindleyana had already been used, Mast and Thiele had to choose a new specific epithet for D. lindleyana and hence for this subspecies of it. As with other members of Banksia ser. Dryandra, it is endemic to the South West Botanical Province of Western Australia. As an autonym, it is defined as encompassing the type material of the species.
