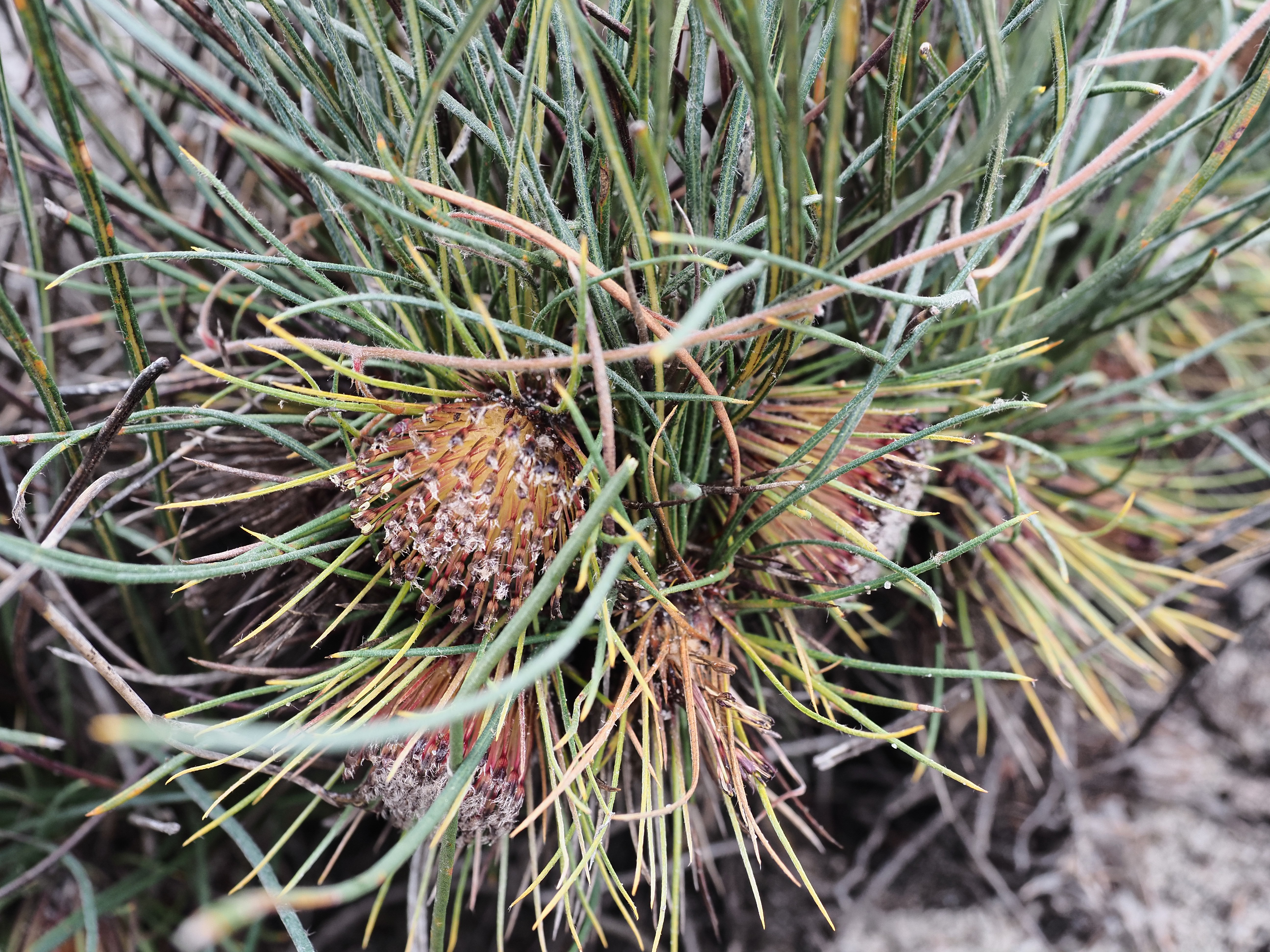
- Banksia subulata in Alexander Morrison National Park

Conservation status
- Priority Three — Poorly Known Taxa (DEC)

Scientific classification
- Kingdom: Plantae
- Clade: Tracheophytes
- Clade: Angiosperms
- Clade: Eudicots
- Order: Proteales
- Family: Proteaceae
- Genus: Banksia
- Subgenus: Banksia subg. Banksia
- Species: B. subulata

Binomial name
- Banksia subulata (C.A.Gardner) A.R.Mast & K.R.Thiele

Synonyms
- Dryandra subulata C.A.Gardner

= Banksia subulata =

Awled honeypot

Species of shrub endemic to Western Australia

Banksia subulata, commonly known as the awled honeypot, is a species of bushy, prostrate shrub that is endemic to the southwest of Western Australia. It has long linear leaves with the edges turned under, yellowish green flowers in heads of about sixty and more or less spherical follicles.

== Description ==
Banksia subulata is a bushy, prostrate shrub that typically grows to a width of 0.5 m (1 ft 8 in) but does not form a lignotuber. It has linear leaves that are 150–350 mm (5.9–13.8 in) long and 2–2.5 mm (0.079–0.098 in) wide on a petiole up to 1 mm (0.039 in) long and with the edges turned under. The flowers are yellowish green and arranged in heads of between sixty-five and seventy-five with many leaf-like, subulate bracts 30–80 mm (1.2–3.1 in) long and lance-shaped involucral bracts 10–12 mm (0.39–0.47 in) long at the base of the head. The perianth is 22–24 mm (0.87–0.94 in) long and the pistil 22–24 mm (0.87–0.94 in) long. Flowering occurs from September to October and the fruit is an almost spherical follicle about 11 mm (0.43 in) wide.

== Taxonomy ==
This species was first published as Dryandra subulata in 1964 by Charles Gardner in the Journal of the Royal Society of Western Australia from specimens he collected near the Hill River.

In Alex George's 1996 arrangement, this species was recognised as quite distinctive, being unusual in its long, unserrated leaves, its rigid awl-shaped floral leaves, and its round follicles. With no obvious relatives, the species was placed alone in a new series named Dryandra ser. Subulatae.

Since 1998, Austin Mast has been publishing results of ongoing cladistic analyses of DNA sequence data for the subtribe Banksiinae. His analyses have provided evidence of the paraphyly of Banksia with respect to Dryandra; that is, it seems that Dryandra arose from within the ranks of Banksia. Early in 2007, Mast and Kevin Thiele initiated a rearrangement of Banksia by sinking Dryandra into it; Dryandra subulata thus became Banksia subulata. Mast's analyses placed B. subulata not with the other Dryandra species sampled, but rather within a small clade of Banksia species with independently reduced inflorescence axes. For this reason, B. subulata was placed incertae sedis in B. subg. Banksia, rather than in B. ser. Dryandra with the other Dryandra species.

== Distribution and habitat ==
Banksia subulata grows in low kwongan between Eneabba and the Hill River.

== Conservation status ==
This banksia is classified as "Priority Three" by the Government of Western Australia Department of Parks and Wildlife meaning that it is poorly known and known from only a few locations but is not under imminent threat.
