= Banksia idiogenes =

Conservation status
- Priority Two — Poorly Known Taxa (DEC)

Scientific classification
- Kingdom: Plantae
- Clade: Tracheophytes
- Clade: Angiosperms
- Clade: Eudicots
- Order: Proteales
- Family: Proteaceae
- Genus: Banksia
- Subgenus: Banksia subg. Banksia
- Series: Banksia ser. Dryandra
- Species: B. idiogenes

Binomial name
- Banksia idiogenes (A.S.George) A.R.Mast & K.R.Thiele

Synonyms
- Dryandra idiogenes A.S.George

Species of shrub endemic to Western Australia

Banksia idiogenes is a species of tufted shrub that is endemic to Western Australia. It has hairy stems, deeply pinnatifid leaves, distinctive, scented, red and white flowers in heads of about eighty, later several glabrous, egg-shaped follicles in each head.

== Description ==
Banksia idiogenes is a tufted shrub up to about 70 cm (28 in) in diameter with hairy stems, but does not form a lignotuber. The leaves are deeply pinnatifid, 150–370 mm (5.9–14.6 in) long and 12–38 mm (0.47–1.50 in) wide on a petiole up to 90 mm (3.5 in) long. There are between twenty and twenty-five triangular lobes up to 19 mm (0.75 in) long on each side of the leaves and the lower surface has a prominent network of veins. The flowers are strongly scented and arranged in groups of about eighty in a head on the ends of branches, often the heads close together. There are linear to lance-shaped, papery involucral bracts up to 45 mm (1.8 in) long at the base of the head. The flowers have a perianth 36–44 mm (1.4–1.7 in) long that is white near the base and deep red near the end, and a cream-coloured pistil 35–39 mm (1.4–1.5 in) long. Flowering occurs in August and several egg-shaped, glabrous follicles 12–13 mm (0.47–0.51 in) long form in each head.

== Taxonomy ==
This species was first formally described by Alex George in 1996 in the journal Nuytsia and given the name Dryandra idiogenes, from material he collected near Newdegate in 1986. The specific epithet (idiogenes) is an ancient Greek word meaning "distinctive" or "peculiar", in reference to this species' unusual bracts and strongly scented red and white flowers.

In 2007, Austin Mast and Kevin Thiele transferred all the dryandras to the genus Banksia and this species became Banksia idiogenes.

== Distribution and habitat ==
Banksia idiogenes grows in kwongan and is only known from several small populations in a small area near Newdegate in the Mallee biogeographic region.

== Conservation status ==
This banksia is classified as "Priority Two" by the Western Australian Government Department of Parks and Wildlife meaning that it is poorly known and from only one or a few locations.
