= Kwongan =

Australian plant community

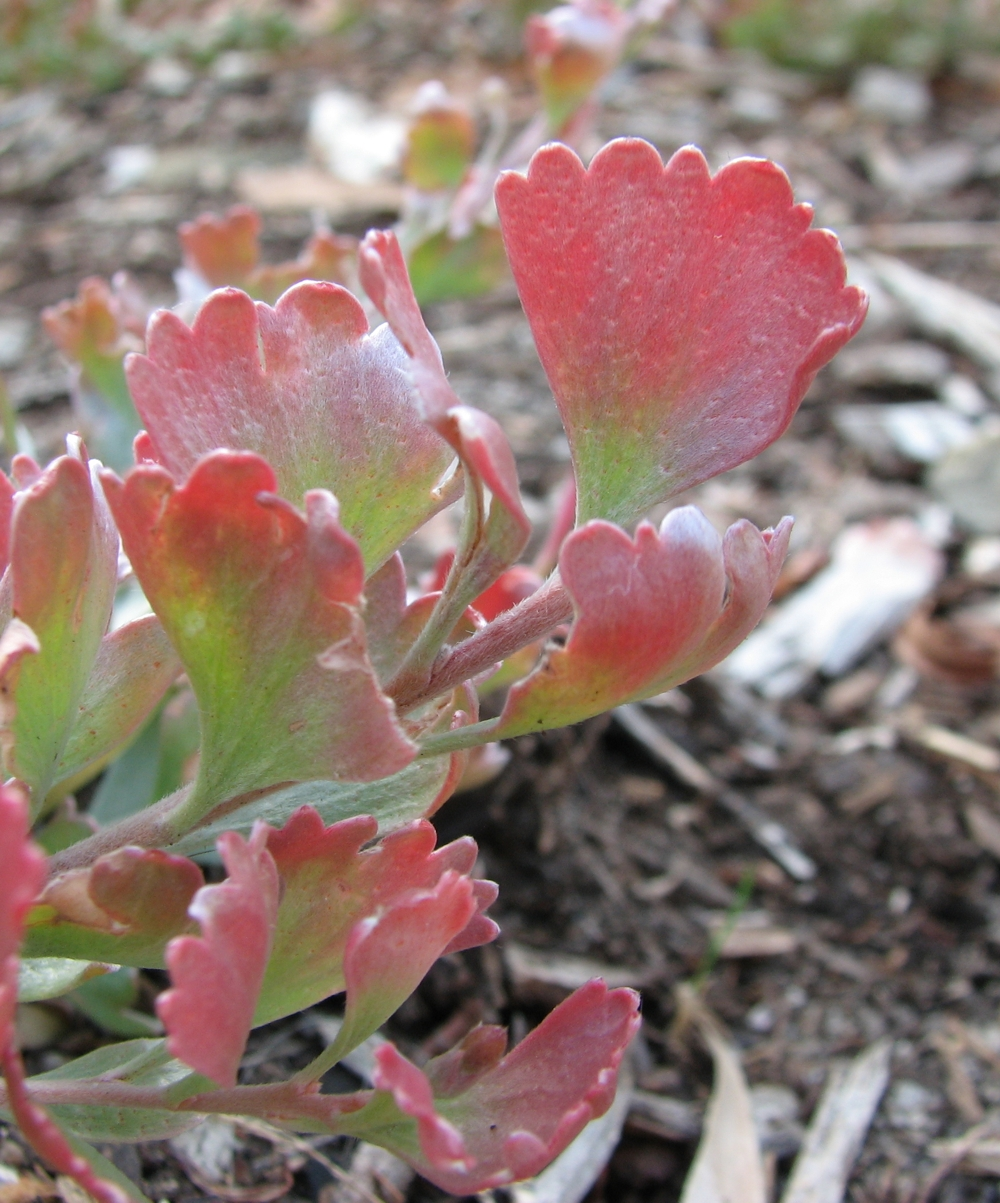
The prostrate form of Adenanthos cuneatus, a plant characteristic of kwongan heathlands

Kwongan is a plant community found in south-western Western Australia. The name is a Bibulman Aboriginal term of wide geographical use defined by Beard (1976) as:

...a type of country ...[that is] sandy and is open without timber-sized trees but with a scrubby vegetation. It consists of plains in an Australian sense of open country rather than in a strict sense of flat country. ... there are two principal plant formations in the kwongan, scrub heath and broombush thicket ... both ... are sclerophyll shrublands and possess a certain unity when contrasted with woodland and forest or steppe and succulent steppe communities.

Kwongan has replaced other terms applied by European botanists such as sand-heide (Diels 1906) or sand heath (Gardner 1942), giving priority to the language of people who have lived continuously in the southwest for more than 50,000 years. Recent archeological evidence shows occupation of the Kwongan for at least 25,500 years.

Thus, kwongan has come again into common usage for the Southwest Australian Floristic Region's shrubland vegetation and associated countryside, equivalent to South Africa's fynbos, California's chaparral, France's maquis and Chile's matorral as seen in these other regions of the world experiencing a Mediterranean climate.

== Etymology ==
To reflect contemporary orthographies, linguists strictly spell kwongan as kwongkan (Douglas 1976, Dench 1994), or kquarngqqaan (von Brandenstein 1988). As with so many other aspects of the southwest flora, colonial botanist James Drummond was the first to record Bibbelmun usage of the term in an 1839 letter to Kew's Director Sir William Hooker, where guangan was described as the Noongar name for

sand, but I mean by it the open sandy desert which commences 80 miles E.N.E. of Fremantle and is known to continue in the same direction for 200 miles ... Fresh water is scarce ...even in our rainy season. It is undulating country, the hills generally small and low, the soil on them is strong clay ... the valleys between these hills are generally extensive and sandy, covered thinly with small shrubs.

An 1839 map of Toodyay Valley Land Grants and Locations has on it the term Guangan two miles east of Bejoording townsite, south of Bolgart (reprinted in Erickson 1969: 32). Another collector Ludwig Preiss spelt the term as quangen (Beard 1976). Moore (1842) gave the spelling gongan for "a sandy district. The easiest road, or usual path, or mountain pass to a place."

The town of Wongan Hills derives its name from kwongan. Drummond (3 October 1842, republished in Erickson (1969: 165) and in Hercock et al. 2011:313) reported the native name of Guangan Catta, which means hills above the kwongan, when he first saw the hills in the distance accompanied by Cabbinger and an unnamed Bibbelmun guide. An article in the Perth Gazette (1 June 1847) by "Ketoun" reported on "A trip to the Wongan Hills", where on 27 April 1844 his party "...crossed an immense 'gwongan', these gwongans are open undulating patches of scrubby country, ... of a quartz formation." (reprinted in Hercock et al. 2011: 337).

The same term with a different spelling was recorded by pastoralist J.P. Brooks (1896) for the Israelite Bay-Cape Arid district some 900 km SE of Wongan Hills. He described and defined quowcken as the Aboriginal word for sand plain or "open plain without timber", occasionally interspersed with small swamps dominated by trees of yate (mauw (von Brandenstein 1988), Eucalyptus occidentalis) and yauwl (yauwarl (ibid.), Melaleuca cuticularis). Approaching from the northeast after traversing the head of the Great Australian Bight, explorer E.J. Eyre in 1840 noted these same "sandy downs, covered with low shrubs or bushes" (Eyre 1845), but was unaware of the local Aboriginal name applied to them.

Jerramungup settler A.A. Hassell recorded the name used by Wilomen people for sand plain as qwonken, and journalist Daisy Bates in 1913 was the first to record the spelling as kwongan (Bindon and Chadwick 1992). Bibbelmun people clearly used the term widely, across many dialects and substantial distances in semi-arid country northeast and southeast of Perth.

The first book devoted to kwongan (Pate and Beard 1984) attempted to divorce the application of the term to both sandy countryside and vegetation, as Noongars had used it. Beard and Pate (1984) preferred to apply kwongan strictly to vegetation, defining it technically as:

... any community of sclerophyll shrubland in south-western Australia which has a stratum + 1 m tall or less of leptophyllous and nanophyllous shrubs. It may also contain either taller shrubs, which may be dominant – so long as the dominants are of genera other than Eucalyptus – or scattered trees of any kind which are not dominant.

Thus, they intended to extend use of the term kwongan to shrublands beyond those on sandy soils, such as coastal heaths on limestone and granite, and hill thickets on various rock types. Conforming to Brooks' (1896) definition, scattered trees were also included as a component of kwongan provided they did not dominate the heaths and thickets. The countryside on which kwongan vegetation most commonly occurred was termed "sandplain" by Beard and Pate (1984). This clarification, while helpful for strict vegetation science, removed the use of kwongan well beyond its original Noongar meaning of sand or sandy country, easily traversed because of low scrubby vegetation, occasionally with scattered trees. Such scientific nomenclatural appropriation is controversial today in cross-cultural dialogue. However, a focus on both vegetation and on sandy soils and sand plain will undoubtedly remain important components of kwongan studies, whichever nuance of definition and meaning is favoured.

Kwongan is extensive, occupying about a quarter of the Southwest Australian Floristic Region, and contains 70% of the 8000+ native plant species known from this global biodiversity hotspot (Beard and Pate 1984; Hopper and Gioia 2004). Half of these species are found nowhere else on Earth. This makes kwongan vegetation one of the most significant natural heritage assets in a temperate climatic region, deserving the increasing national and international attention it so richly merits. Kwongan contains an array of plants, animals, micro-organisms and life histories that are both poorly studied and exceptionally diverse, affording opportunities for novel biological discovery (Pate and Beard 1984). Kwongan also offers profound insights into evolution at its most prolonged and sophisticated, on old, climatically buffered infertile landscapes that are rare on Earth today (OCBIL theory; Hopper 2009). Bibbelmun people developed and have profound understanding of aspects of kwongan useful to human lifeways (e.g. von Brandenstein 1988) that will become increasingly important in a rapidly changing world. For example, developing new forms of agriculture in phosphorus-limited landscapes has much to learn from the study of kwongan plants, and inclusion of Bibbelmun staples such as Platysace tubers in future agriculture is now under active experimentation (Moule 2009).

== Conservation ==
Scientists from the University of Western Australia are proposing the region for World Heritage status.
