= Ecology of Banksia =

Banksia in its environment

Banksia has a number of adaptations that have so far enabled the genus to survive despite dry, nutrient-poor soil, low rates of seed set, high rates of seed predation and low rates of seedling survival. These adaptations include proteoid roots and lignotubers; specialised floral structures that attract nectariferous animals and ensure effective pollen transfer; and the release of seed in response to bushfire.

The arrival of Europeans in Australia has brought new ecological challenges. European colonisation of Australia has directly affected Banksia through deforestation, exploitation of flowers and changes to the fire regime. In addition, the accidental introduction and spread of plant pathogens such as Phytophthora cinnamomi (dieback) pose a serious threat to the genus' habitat and biodiversity. Various conservation measures have been put in place to mitigate these threats, but a number of taxa remain endangered.

== Background ==
Banksia is a genus of around 170 species in the plant family Proteaceae. An iconic Australian wildflower and popular garden plant, Banksias are most commonly associated with their elongate flower spikes and fruiting "cones", although less than half of Banksia species possess this feature. They grow in forms varying from prostrate woody shrubs to trees up to 30 metres tall, and occur in all but the most arid areas of Australia.

== Pollination ==
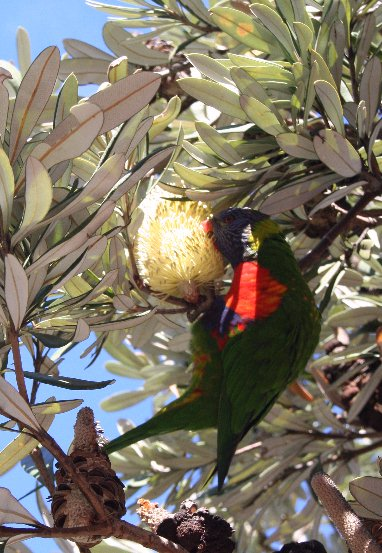
A rainbow lorikeet feasts on nectar from a Banksia integrifolia inflorescence. In the process it transfers pollen between plants, thus playing an important role in the species' reproduction.

The pollination ecology of Banksia has been well studied, because the large showy inflorescences make it easy to conduct pollination experiments, and the pollination roles of nectariferous birds and mammals makes the genus a popular subject for zoologists.

Visits to Banksia inflorescences by western honeybees and nectarivorous birds are often observed and are obviously important to pollination. Also important are visits by nectariferous mammals, although such visits are rarely observed because these mammals are usually nocturnal and reclusive. Studies have found that Banksia inflorescences are foraged by a variety of small mammals, including marsupials (such as honey possums and yellow-footed antechinus, Antechinus flavipes), and rodents (such as the pale field rat, Rattus tunneyi). Studies in New South Wales and in Western Australia found that small mammals can carry pollen loads comparable to those of nectarivorous birds, likely making them effective pollinators of many "Banksia" species. Other studies have shown that the relative importance of vertebrates and invertebrates for pollination may vary from species to species, with some Banksia species exhibiting reduced fruit set when vertebrate pollinators are excluded, while others are unaffected by the exclusion of vertebrates and set some fruit even when all pollinators are excluded.

Almost all Banksia species studied so far have shown outcrossing rates among the highest ever recorded for plants; that is, very few Banksia plants are found to occur as a result of self-fertilisation. There are a number of potential reasons for this.

One possibility is that Banksia flowers are simply not exposed to their own pollen. This is highly unlikely for two reasons. Firstly, the morphology of the Banksia flower makes it virtually inevitable that the stigma will be exposed to its own pollen, since it functions also as a "pollen-presenter". It has been suggested that this problem would be avoided if the flowers were strongly protandrous, but the evidence so far supports only partial protandry. Moreover, the question of protandry of individual flowers is probably irrelevant, because the sequential anthesis of flowers means that each inflorescence will typically contain flowers in both male and female stages at the same time. Observations of foraging patterns in pollinators have shown that transfer of pollen between different flowers in the same inflorescence is inevitable.

Another possibility is that the high outcrossing rate is due to self-incompatibility, due either to a failure to fertilise or abortion of self-fertilised fruit. Studies have shown self-compatibility of pollen to vary between Banksia species, with some but not all species inhibiting the growth of pollen tubes for pollen from its own flowers. A more likely form of self-incompatibility is the spontaneous abortion of fruits that have been self-fertilised. These could be caused either by the expression of lethal genes, or the expression of genes that, while not lethal, cause the maternal plant to abort. Genetic causes are thought to be a common form of self-incompatibility, because of the high genetic load of the genus. However abortion rates are difficult to assess because the ovaries are deeply embedded in the "rhachis" (woody spine) of the inflorescence.

Finally, there is the mechanism of "facultative" abortion of fruits, where a maternal plant without the resources to mature all fruit aborts the least vigorous ones. This is thought to be common in those taxa that are generally self-compatible, since even these have high outcrossing rates. For example, B. neoanglica, one of the most self-compatible Banksia species, has been shown to set far more cross-pollinated than self-pollinated fruit.

A few species, such as B. brownii, are exceptional in having low outcrossing rates. In all cases these are rare species that occur in very small populations, which increases the probability of self-fertilisation, and may discourage visits by pollinators.

== Response to fire ==
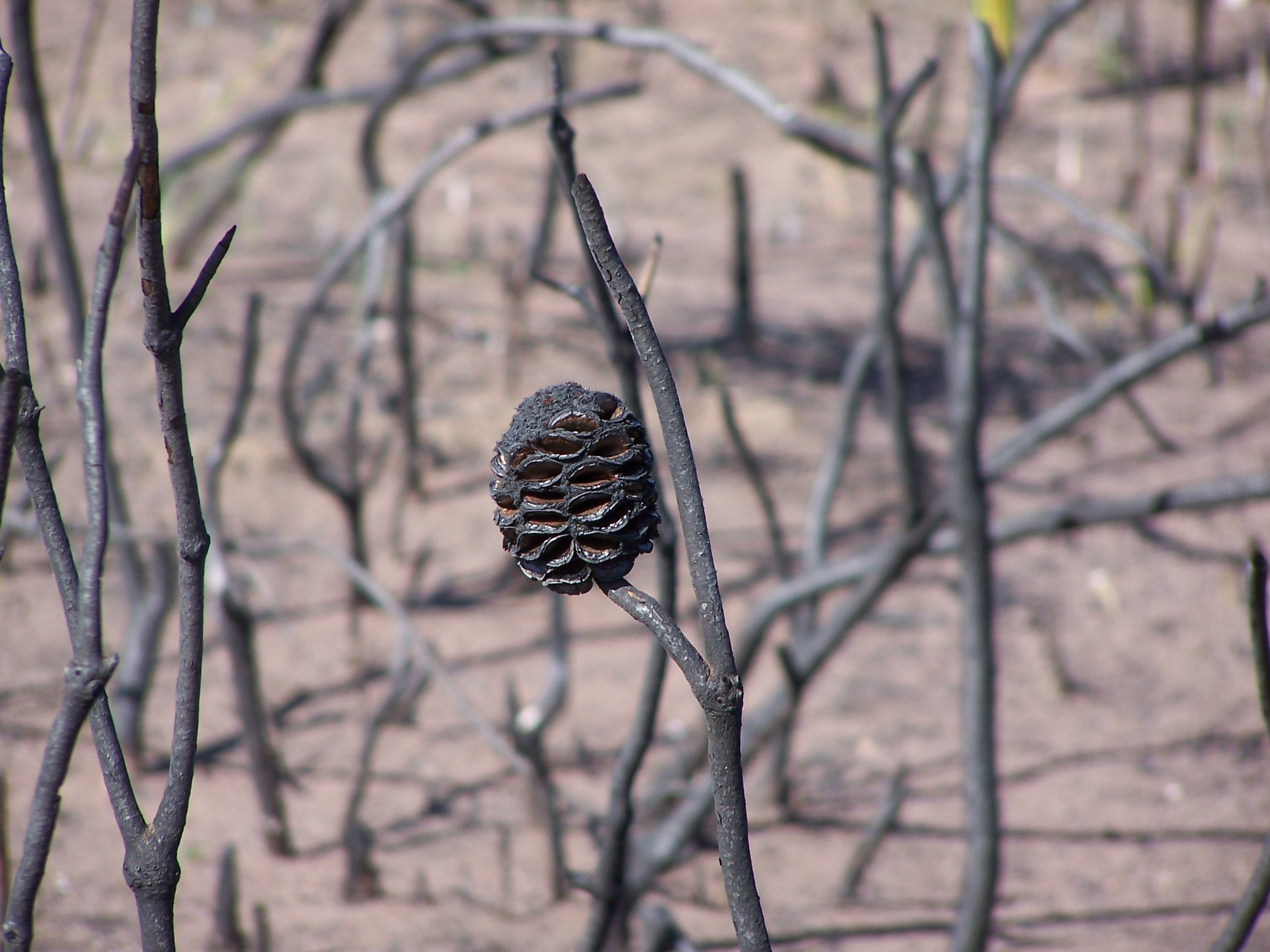
B. telmatiaea after fire. The maternal plant has been killed, but the fire has also triggered the release of seed, ensuring population recovery.

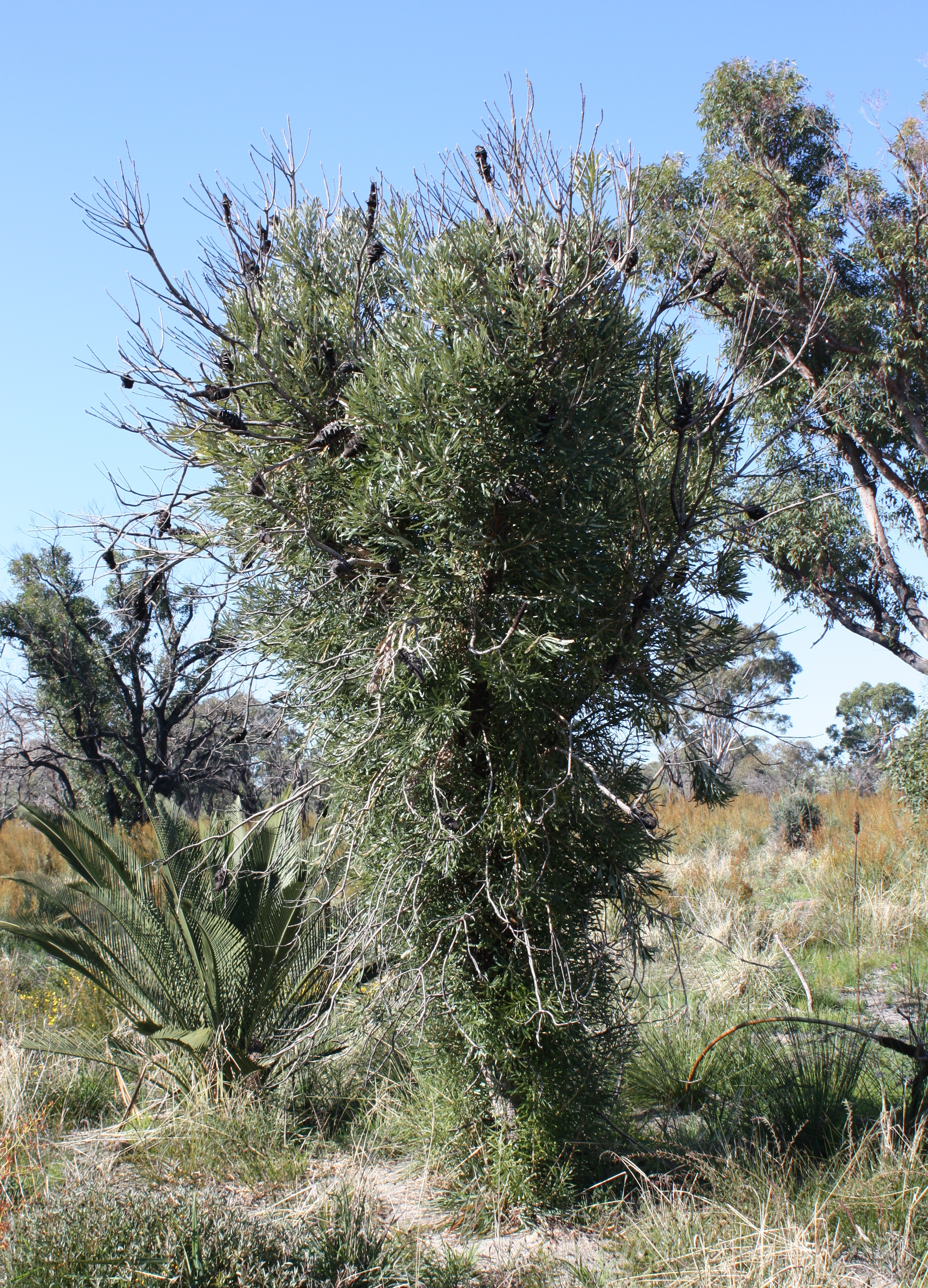
B. attenuata resprouting from epicormic buds after fire

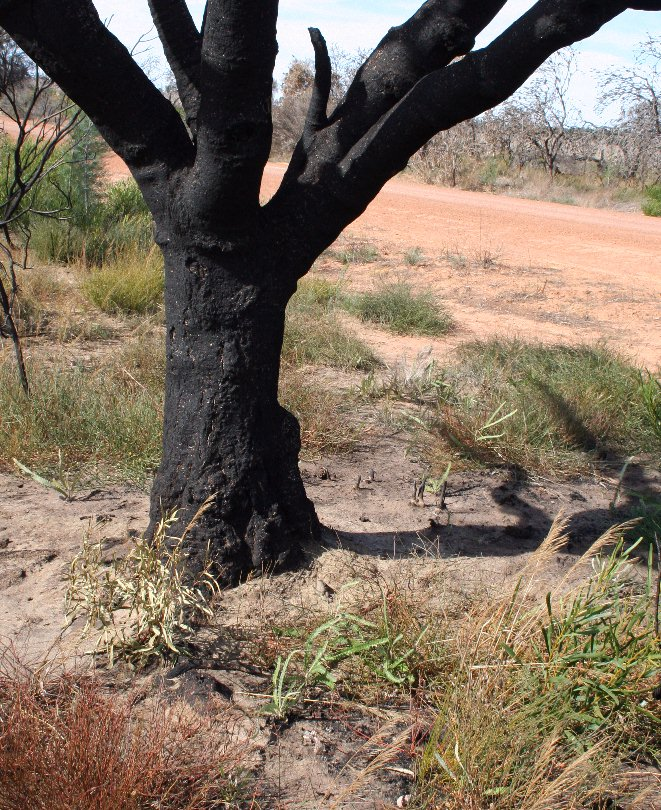
B. prionotes after fire. The maternal plant has been burnt, and possibly killed; but note the seedlings coming up beneath it.

Banksia plants are naturally adapted to the presence of regular bushfires. About half of Banksia species typically survive bushfires, either because they have very thick bark that protects the trunk from fire, or because they have lignotubers from which they can resprout after fire. In addition, fire triggers the release of seed stored in the aerial seed bank, an adaptation known as serotiny. In ecological literature, the species that are killed by fire but regenerate from seed are referred to as "fire-sensitive" or "seeders", while those that typically survive by resprouting from a trunk or underground lignotuber are called "fire-tolerant" or "sprouters".

All Banksia exhibit serotiny to some extent. Most retain all of their seed until release is triggered by fire, but a few species release a small amount of seed spontaneously. Serotiny is achieved through the mechanism of thick, woody follicles, which are held tightly closed by resin. Seeds retained in follicles are protected from granivores and the heat of bushfire, and remain viable for around ten years. Follicles require a critical heat to melt the resin, so that the follicles may begin opening; for B. elegans, for example, this is 2 minutes at 500 °C. Those species with high heat requirements typically retain their old withered florets. These are highly combustible and thus help ensure the critical heat is reached.

With some exceptions, each follicle contains two seeds plus a winged "separator". While the separator remains in the follicle, it holds the seeds in position. In some species, the separator remains in the follicle until it has cooled; once cooled, the separator loosens and falls out, and the seeds follow. In this way the separator ensures that the seeds fall onto cool ground. In other species, the separator does not loosen until it has been wet. In these species, the seeds do not fall to the ground until the first rains after the bushfire. Seed is typically released over a period of about 90 days.

Immediately after bushfire, granivorous birds move in to extract seed from newly open follicles, and to eat seeds that have fallen to the ground. Those seeds that escape the granivores are soon buried by wind and surface water. Nearly all buried seeds germinate.

== Establishment of seedlings ==
Most Banksia seedlings do not survive to adulthood. A major reason for this is a lack of water. Competition for soil moisture can be intense, especially during drought. In one study, an estimated 13680 seedlings were counted over June–October following an experimental bushfire, but by January only eleven plants remained. Other threats to seedling establishment include predation by invertebrates such as grasshoppers and mites; and by vertebrates such as kangaroos and bandicoots.

== Diseases, predation and other symbioses ==
Banksia seed is predated on by birds and insects. Insects also feed on stems, leaves, flowers and cones. Some insects cause galls. Many species of fungi live on Banksia plants, including Banksiamyces. Most Banksia species are highly susceptible to Phytophthora cinnamomi dieback.

== Conservation ==
The biodiversity of Banksia is impacted by a range of processes. Major threats include disease, changes in fire frequency and intensity, clearing of land for agriculture, mining, urban development and roads and exploitation of flowers, seeds and foliage by the cut flower and other industries. Three Banksia species are currently declared endangered under Australia's Environment Protection and Biodiversity Conservation Act 1999, and a further two are considered vulnerable.

=== Disease ===
The most severe disease threat to Banksia is the introduced plant pathogen Phytophthora cinnamomi, commonly known as "dieback". This is a water mould that attacks the roots of plants, destroying the structure of the root tissues, "rotting" the root, and preventing the plant from absorbing water and nutrients. Banksia's proteoid roots make it highly susceptible to this disease, with infected plants typically dying within a few years of exposure.

The threat of exposure to dieback is greatest in southwest Western Australia, where dieback infestation has reached epidemic proportions. This area holds the greatest species diversity for Banksia, with all species considered susceptible to infection. Consequently, a number of southwestern species are considered under threat from dieback. Nearly every known wild population of B. brownii shows some signs of dieback infection, and it is said that this species would be extinct within a decade if it were not protected. Other vulnerable species include B. cuneata, B. goodii, B. oligantha and B. verticillata.

Infested areas of Banksia forest in southwest Western Australia typically have less than 30% of the cover of uninfested areas. Plant deaths in such large proportions can have a profound influence on the makeup of plant communities. For example, in southwestern Australia Banksia often occurs as an understory to forests of jarrah (Eucalyptus marginata), another species highly vulnerable to dieback. Infestation kills both the jarrah overstory and the Banksia understory, and over time these may be replaced by a more open woodland consisting of an overstory of the resistant marri (Corymbia calophylla), and an understory of the somewhat resistant Parrotbush (Dryandra sessilis).

Dieback is notoriously difficult to manage. A number of protective measures have been implemented to slow the spread of disease and boost the survival rates of infected plants; these include restricting access to infected and susceptible sites, the collection and cold-storage of seed, and the treatment of plants with phosphite. Phosphite boosts the resistance of both infected and uninfected plants, and also acts as a direct fungicide. Aerial spraying of phosphite boosts plant survival and slows the spread of infection, but must be carefully managed as studies have shown that foliar spraying of phosphite adversely affects root and shoot growth. Direct injection of phosphite into tree stems appears to lack this disadvantage, but is costly to administer and restricted to known plants.

Because dieback thrives in moist soil conditions, it can be a severe problem for Banksias that are watered, such as in the cut flower industry and urban gardens. In some species this problem can be countered by grafting onto a rootstock of an eastern species, many of which demonstrate at least some resistant to dieback.

Other diseases to which Banksia species are vulnerable include the aerial canker fungus Zythiostroma and the parasitic fungus Armillaria.

=== Fire regime ===
The frequency and intensity of bushfires are important factors in the population health of Banksias. The ideal time interval between bushfires varies from species to species, but twenty years is a typical figure. If bushfires occur too frequently, plants are killed before they reach fruiting age or before they have developed a substantial seed bank. This can seriously reduce or even eliminate populations in some areas. Longer time intervals also reduce populations, as more plants die of natural attrition between fires. Unlike some other Proteaceae, Banksias do not release their seed when they die, and dead plants usually release much less seed in response to fire than live plants do, so long fire intervals cause seed wastage. Fire intensity is also important. If a fire is not intense enough to promote the release of seed, then the effective interval between seed release will be further increased by the loss of fire fuel.

Fire intervals are not as critical for resprouters, as adults typically survive fire. Fire does kill seedlings, however, as most resprouters do not develop a lignotuber until they reach fruiting age. Thus overly frequent fires prevent the recruitment of new adults, and populations decline at the rate that adults die.

It is widely accepted that colonisation by Europeans has led to an increase in fire frequency. This is especially the case near urban areas, where bushland is subject to both arson and prescribed burns. The proximity of urban areas creates a need to manage the ferocity and rate of occurrence of bushfires, resulting in pressure to prescribe regular low-intensity burns. This is at odds with the conservation needs of Banksia, which requires intense fires at long intervals.

=== Land clearing ===
The distribution of Banksia habitat coincides with areas of high population density, and large areas of Banksia woodland have been cleared for agriculture, mining, urban development and roads. As well as the direct loss of population and habitat, this has led to an increased spread of weeds and disease. As Banksia occurs on the poorest soils, the areas in which they are most abundant have been the last to be cleared for agriculture. Nonetheless, it is estimated that 55% of Banksia woodland had been cleared by 1986. Species threatened by clearing include B. hookeriana and the endangered species B. cuneata and B. goodii.

=== Exploitation by wildflower industry ===
Banksias are highly favoured by Australia's wildflower industry, with commercial picking of blooms especially prevalent in southwest Western Australia. Blooms are harvested from around 29 Banksia species, the most popular being B. hookeriana, B. coccinea and B. baxteri. As of 1990 there were around 1000 licensed commercial pickers operating in the state, and in that year around 675000 blooms were harvested from B. hookeriana alone. Heavy harvesting of blooms substantially reduces harvest head production, resulting in a smaller seedbank. It is estimated population sizes for the next generation are likely to be around half the current populations at picking sites.

=== Threatened species ===
19 Banksia taxa are currently declared rare. All are endemic to Western Australia. Protection is afforded to them under the Australian Environment Protection and Biodiversity Conservation Act 1999 (EPBC Act), and the Western Australian Wildlife Conservation Act 1950. The Department of Environment and Conservation also provides for taxa to be declared "Priority Flora", either because they are poorly known, or because they are rare but not threatened. The following is a list of threatened and priority Banksia taxa:

Species	Designation		Major threats
Species	Australia (EPBC Act)	Western Australia (Wildlife Conservation Act)	Major threats
B. acanthopoda	-	Priority 2 (Poorly known but not threatened)	
B. aculeata	-	Priority 2 (Poorly known but not threatened)	
B. acuminata	?	Priority 4 (Rare but not threatened)	
B. anatona	?	Rare	Dieback
B. aurantia	?	Rare	Dieback
B. bella	?	Priority 4 (Rare but not threatened)	
B. benthamiana	-	Priority 4 (Rare but not threatened)	
B. borealis subsp. elatior	?	Priority 3 (Poorly known but not threatened)	
B. brownii	Endangered	Rare	Dieback
B. calophylla	?	Priority 3 (Poorly known but not threatened)	
B. catoglypta	-	Priority 2 (Poorly known but not threatened)	
B. chamaephyton	-	Priority 4 (Rare but not threatened)	
B. comosa	?	Priority 4 (Rare but not threatened)	
B. concinna	?	Priority 4 (Rare but not threatened)	
B. corvijuga	?	Priority 1 (Poorly known and threatened)	
B. cuneata	Endangered	Rare	Loss of habitat, feral rabbits, dieback
B. cynaroides	?	Priority 4 (Rare but not threatened)	
B. cypholoba	?	Priority 3 (Poorly known but not threatened)	
B. dallanneyi subsp. agricola	?	Priority 2 (Poorly known but not threatened)	
B. dallanneyi subsp. pollosta	?	Priority 3 (Poorly known but not threatened)	
B. densa var. parva	?	Priority 2 (Poorly known but not threatened)	
B. drummondii subsp. macrorufa	?	Priority 2 (Poorly known but not threatened)	
B. elegans	-	Priority 4 (Rare but not threatened)	
B. epica	-	Priority 2 (Poorly known but not threatened)	
B. epimicta	?	Priority 2 (Poorly known but not threatened)	
B. erythrocephala var. inopinata	?	Priority 2 (Poorly known but not threatened)	
B. fasciculata	?	Priority 3 (Poorly known but not threatened)	
B. foliolata	?	Priority 4 (Rare but not threatened)	
B. foliosissima	?	Priority 2 (Poorly known but not threatened)	
B. fraseri var. crebra	?	Priority 3 (Poorly known but not threatened)	
B. fraseri var. effusa	?	Priority 2 (Poorly known but not threatened)	
B. fraseri var. oxycedra	?	Priority 3 (Poorly known but not threatened)	
B. fuscobractea	?	Rare	Dieback
B. goodii	Vulnerable	Rare	Loss of habitat, dieback
B. hirta	?	Priority 3 (Poorly known but not threatened)	
B. horrida	?	Priority 3 (Poorly known but not threatened)	
B. idiogenes	?	Priority 2 (Poorly known but not threatened)	
B. insulanemorecincta	?	Priority 4 (Rare but not threatened)	
B. ionthocarpa subsp. chrysophoenix	?	Rare	Dieback
B. ionthocarpa subsp. ionthocarpa	?	Rare	Dieback
B. kippistiana var. paenepeccata	?	Priority 3 (Poorly known but not threatened)	
B. laevigata subsp. laevigata	-	Priority 4 (Rare but not threatened)	
B. lepidorhiza	?	Priority 1 (Poorly known and threatened)	
B. lullfitzii	-	Priority 3 (Poorly known but not threatened)	
B. meganotia	?	Priority 3 (Poorly known but not threatened)	
B. meisneri subsp. ascendens	-	Priority 4 (Rare but not threatened)	
B. micrantha	-	Priority 3 (Poorly known but not threatened)	
B. mimica	?	Rare	Dieback
B. montana	?	Rare	Dieback
B. mucronulata subsp. retrorsa	?	Rare	Dieback
B. nivea subsp. uliginosa	?	Rare	Dieback
B. nivea subsp. Morangup (M. Pieroni 94/2)	?	Priority 2 (Poorly known but not threatened)	
B. nobilis subsp. fragrans	?	Priority 3 (Poorly known but not threatened)	
B. oligantha	Endangered	Rare	Loss of habitat, dieback
B. platycarpa	?	Priority 4 (Rare but not threatened)	
B. plumosa subsp. denticulata	?	Priority 2 (Poorly known but not threatened)	
B. porrecta	?	Priority 4 (Rare but not threatened)	
B. prionophylla	?	Priority 1 (Poorly known and threatened)	
B. prolata	?	Priority 3 (Poorly known but not threatened)	
B. prolata subsp. archeos	?	Priority 2 (Poorly known but not threatened)	
B. prolata subsp. calcicola	?	Priority 1 (Poorly known and threatened)	
B. pseudoplumosa	?	Rare	Dieback
B. pteridifolia subsp. inretita	?	Priority 1 (Poorly known and threatened)	
B. pteridifolia subsp. vernalis	?	Priority 3 (Poorly known but not threatened)	
B. rosserae	-	Priority 1 (Poorly known and threatened)	
B. rufa subsp. chelomacarpa	?	Priority 3 (Poorly known but not threatened)	
B. rufa subsp. flavescens	?	Priority 3 (Poorly known but not threatened)	
B. rufa subsp. magma	?	Priority 1 (Poorly known and threatened)	
B. rufa subsp. obliquiloba	?	Priority 3 (Poorly known but not threatened)	
B. rufa subsp. pumila	?	Priority 2 (Poorly known but not threatened)	
B. rufa subsp. tutanningensis	?	Priority 2 (Poorly known but not threatened)	
B. rufistylis	?	Priority 2 (Poorly known but not threatened)	
B. scabrella	-	Priority 4 (Rare but not threatened)	
B. sclerophylla	?	Priority 4 (Rare but not threatened)	
B. seneciifolia	-	Priority 3 (Poorly known but not threatened)	
B. serratuloides subsp. perissa	?	Rare	Dieback
B. serra	?	Priority 4 (Rare but not threatened)	
B. serratuloides subsp. serratuloides	?	Rare	Dieback
B. sessilis var. cordata	?	Priority 4 (Rare but not threatened)	
B. shanklandiorum	?	Priority 4 (Rare but not threatened)	
B. solandri	-	Priority 4 (Rare but not threatened)	
B. sphaerocarpa var. dolichostyla	Vulnerable	Rare	Dieback
B. splendida subsp. macrocarpa	-	Priority 3 (Poorly known but not threatened)	
B. splendida subsp. splendida	?	Priority 2 (Poorly known but not threatened)	
B. squarrosa subsp. argillacea	?	Rare	Dieback
B. strictifolia	-	Priority 3 (Poorly known but not threatened)	
B. subpinnatifida var. imberbis	?	Priority 2 (Poorly known but not threatened)	
B. subpinnatifida var. subpinnatifida	?	Priority 2 (Poorly known but not threatened)	
B. subulata	-	Priority 3 (Poorly known but not threatened)	
B. tortifolia	-	Priority 3 (Poorly known but not threatened)	
B. traditionally	-	Priority 3 (Poorly known but not threatened)	
B. tricuspis	-	Priority 4 (Rare but not threatened)	
B. verticillata	Vulnerable	Rare	Dieback
B. viscida	-	Priority 3 (Poorly known but not threatened)	
B. wonganensis	?	Priority 4 (Rare but not threatened)	
B. xylothemelia	-	Priority 3 (Poorly known but not threatened)	
