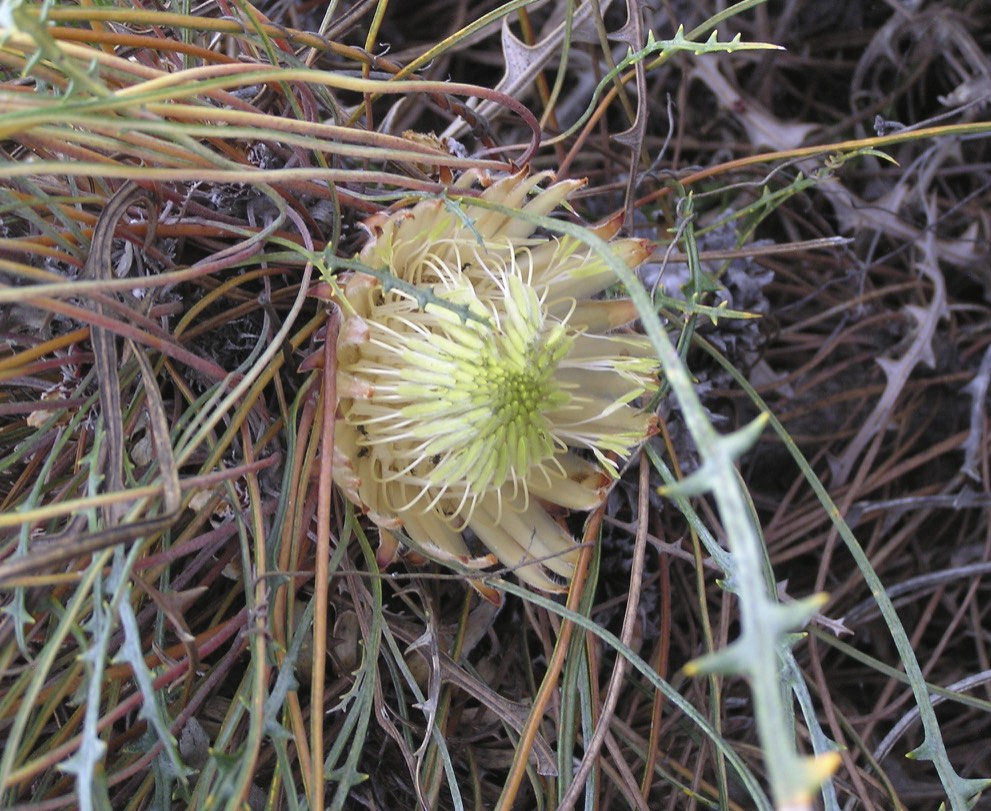
- Banksia rufa near Tarin Rock

Scientific classification
- Kingdom: Plantae
- Clade: Tracheophytes
- Clade: Angiosperms
- Clade: Eudicots
- Order: Proteales
- Family: Proteaceae
- Genus: Banksia
- Subgenus: Banksia subg. Banksia
- Series: Banksia ser. Dryandra
- Species: B. rufa

Binomial name
- Banksia rufa A.R.Mast and K.R.Thiele

Synonyms
- Dryandra ferruginea Kippist ex Meisn.; Dryandra proteoides var. ferruginea (Kippist ex Meisn.) Benth.

= Banksia rufa =

Species of prostrate shrub

Banksia rufa is a species of prostrate shrub that is endemic to the south-west of Western Australia. It has broadly linear, pinnatifid or pinnatipartite leaves with between five and twenty lobes on each side, yellow, orange or brownish flowers in heads of forty or more, and glabrous, egg-shaped follicles.

== Description ==
Banksia rufa is a shrub, either prostrate or growing to a height of 1 m (3 ft 3 in) and sometimes forming a lignotuber. The stems are short, highly branched and woolly-hairy. The leaves are broadly linear, pinnatifid or pinnatipartite, 80–350 mm (3.1–13.8 in) long and 7–30 mm (0.28–1.18 in) wide on a petiole up to 150 mm (5.9 in) long. There are between five and twenty sharply-pointed, linear or triangular lobes on each side of the leaves. The flowers are creamy yellow to orange or brownish and are arranged heads of between 40 and 115 with egg-shaped to oblong involucral bracts 35–66 mm (1.4–2.6 in) long at the base of the head. The perianth is 27–50 mm (1.1–2.0 in) long and the pistil 30–66 mm (1.2–2.6 in) long and gently curved. Flowering occurs from July to September and the follicles are egg-shaped, 12–15 mm (0.47–0.59 in) long and glabrous.

== Taxonomy and naming ==
This species was first formally described in 1855 Carl Meissner in Hooker's Journal of Botany and Kew Garden Miscellany and was given the name Dryandra ferruginea from an unpublished description by Richard Kippist, the type material having been collected by James Drummond.

The following year, Meisner published a description of Dryandra runcinata in Prodromus Systematis Naturalis Regni Vegetabilis and in 1870, George Bentham maintained D. runcinata, but demoted D. ferruginea to Dryandra proteoides var. ferruginea. This stood until 1996, when Alex George restored the specific rank of D. ferruginea, and declared D. runcinata its synonym.

In the same 1996 paper, George described the subspecies chelomacarpa, ferruginea, flavescens, obliquiloba, pumila and tutanningensis in the journal Nuytsia and in 2005 described a seventh, subspecies magna in a later edition of the same journal.

In 2007, all Dryandra species were transferred to Banksia by Austin Mast and Kevin Thiele. As the name Banksia ferruginea had already been published in reference to the plant now known as Pimelea ferruginea, Mast and Thiele changed the name Dryandra ferruginea to Banksia rufa. The specific epithet (rufa) is from the Latin rufus ("reddish"). George's Dryandra ferruginea subspecies were renamed as follows, the names accepted by the Australian Plant Census:

- Banksia rufa subsp. chelomacarpa has prostrate stems and leaves 20–45 mm (0.79–1.77 in) long;
- Banksia rufa subsp. flavescens has prostrate stems and leaves 7–15 mm (0.28–0.59 in) wide;
- Banksia rufa subsp. magna has erect stems, involucral bracts 70–80 mm (2.8–3.1 in) long and is found near Nyabing and Dumbleyung;
- Banksia rufa subsp. obliquiloba is similar to subsp. magna but has less erect leaves and occurs in the Corrigin area;
- Banksia rufa subsp. pumila has erect stems, leaves 80–150 mm (3.1–5.9 in) long and 18–35 mm (0.71–1.38 in) wide, involucral bracts 30–50 mm (1.2–2.0 in) long, and is found in the Stirling Range;
- Banksia rufa subsp. rufa has erect stems, leaves 150–350 mm (5.9–13.8 in) long and 10–28 mm (0.39–1.10 in) wide, involucral bracts 30–50 mm (1.2–2.0 in) long, and is found from Wickepin to Nyabing and Lake Grace;
- Banksia rufa subsp. tutanningensis is similar to subsp. rufa and pumila but has bracts 50–66 mm (2.0–2.6 in) long, a longer pistil and is found south-east of Pingelly and east of Quairading.

== Distribution and habitat ==
This banksia is widespread between Pingelly, the Stirling Range and Forrestania where it grows in shrubland and kwongan and is often locally common.

== Conservation status ==
Banksia rufa and subsp. rufa are listed as "not threatened" by the Western Australian Government Department of Parks and Wildlife but all the other subspecies have a priority rating.
