= Albany banksia =

Albany banksia refers to two shrubs endemic to southwestern Australia, named after the town of Albany.

- Banksia coccinea
- Banksia verticillata
Plants named Albany banksia
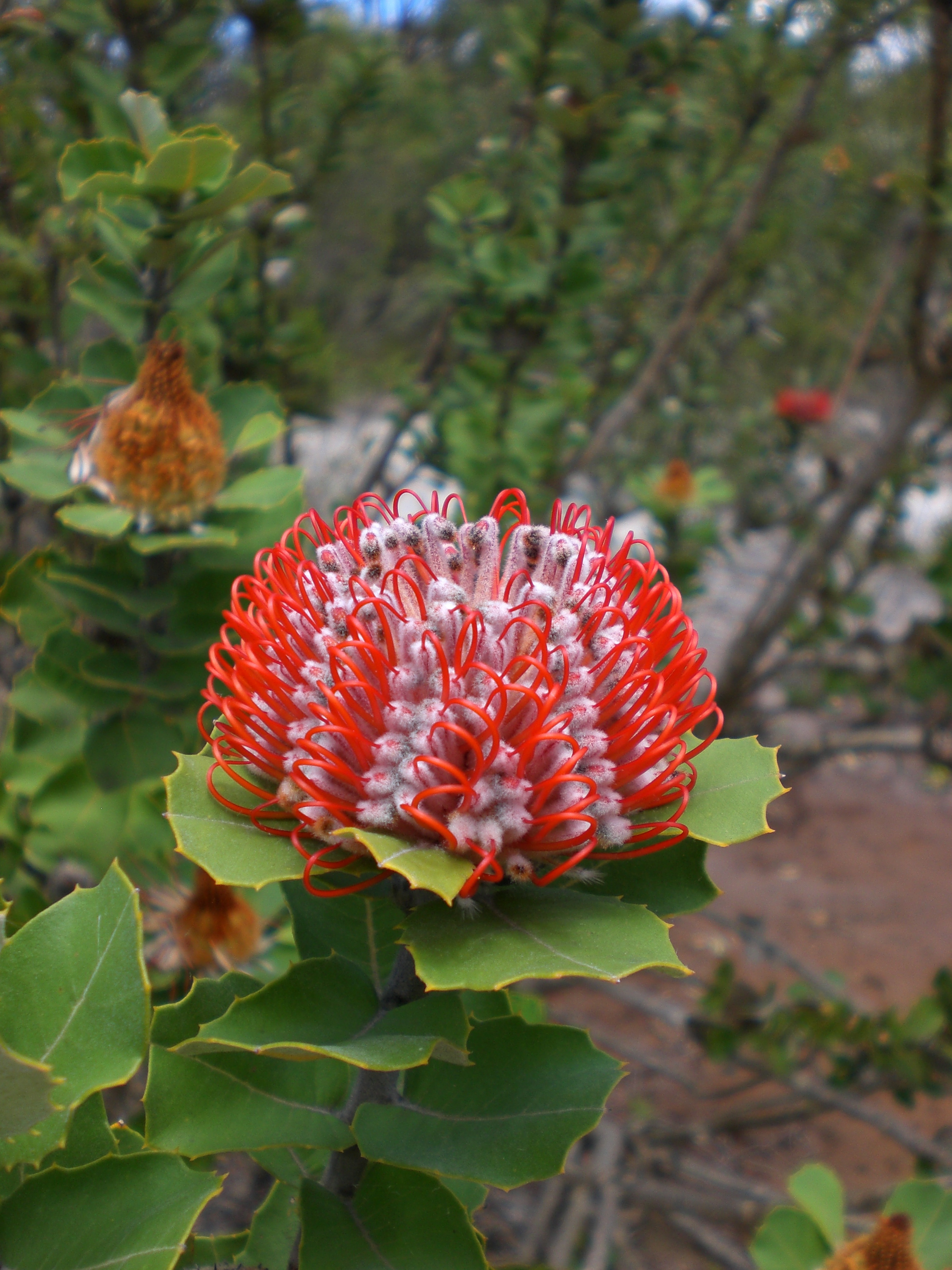
Banksia coccinea

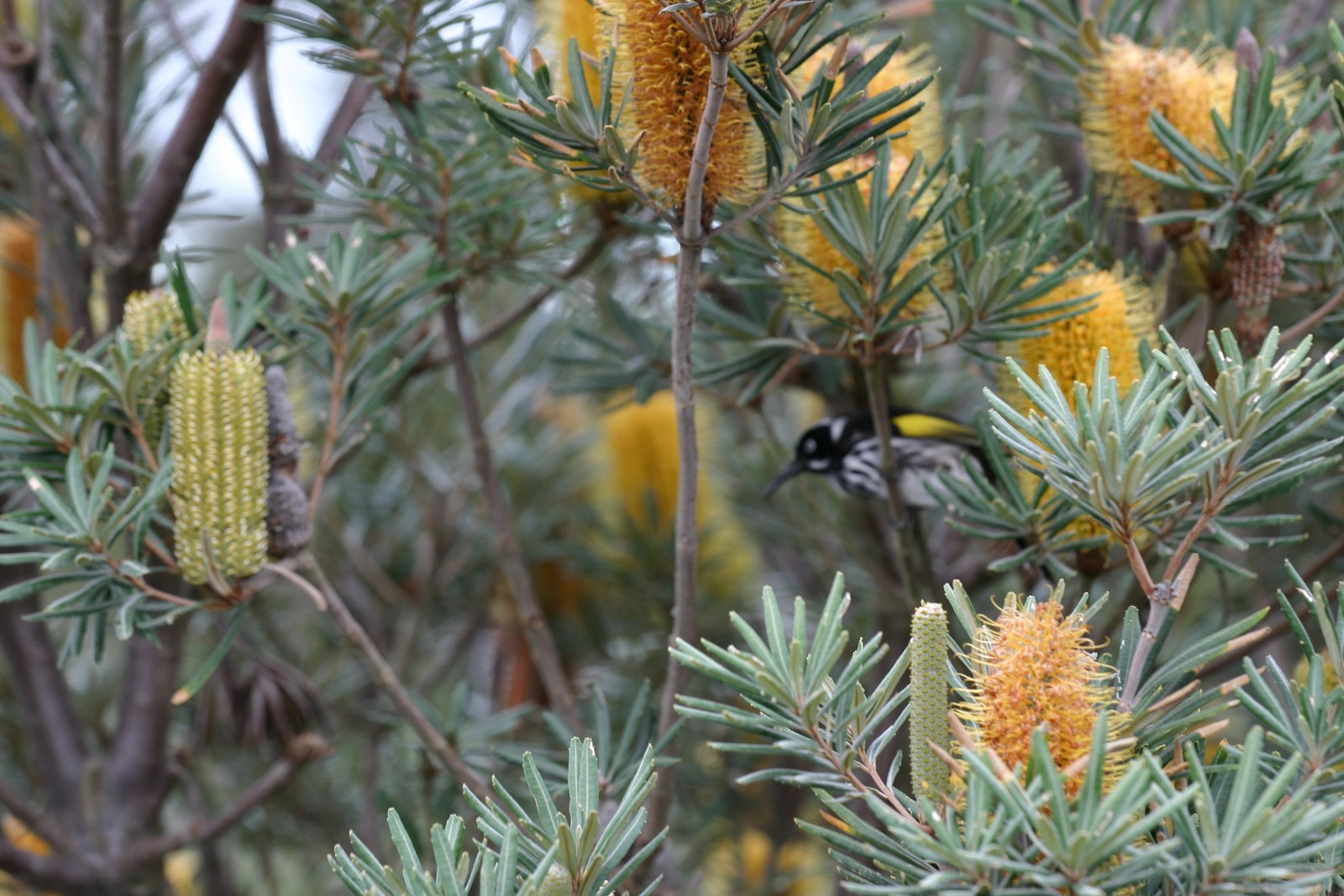
Banksia verticillata
