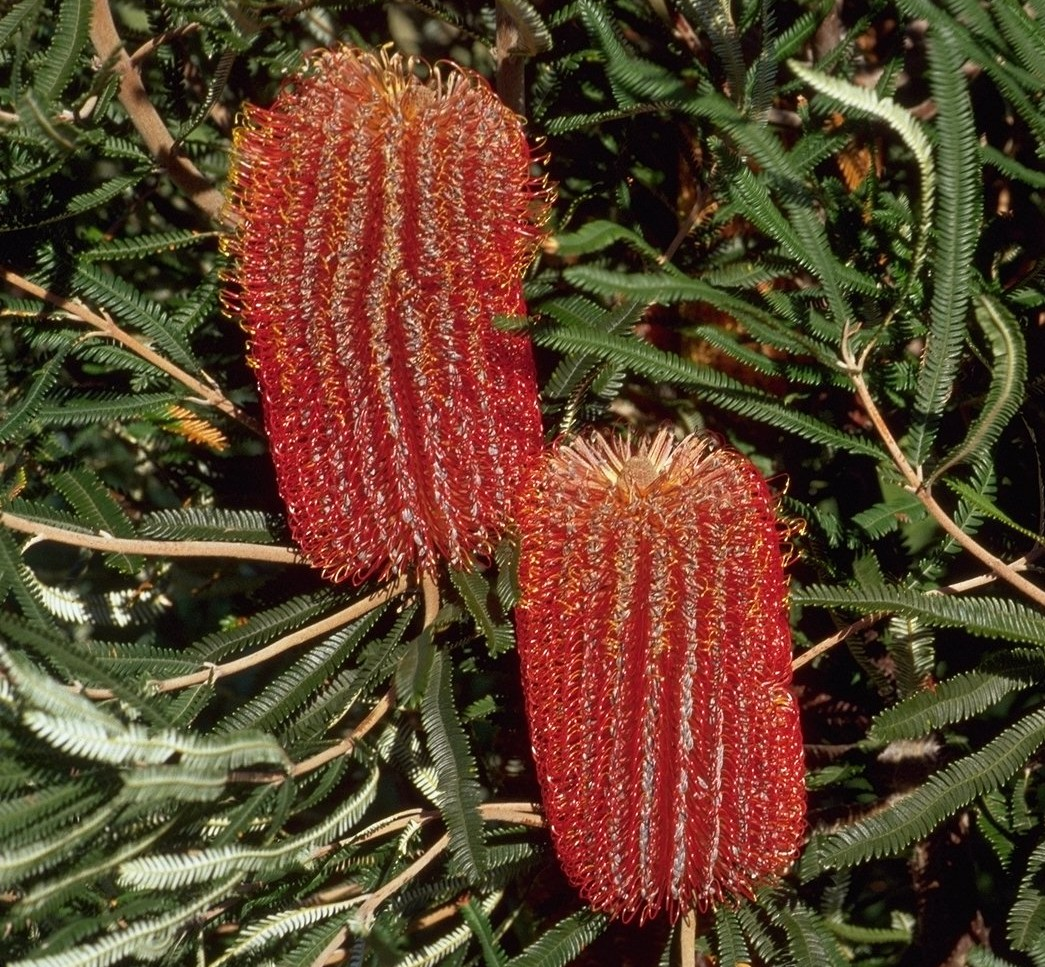
- inflorescences and leaves.

Conservation status
- Critically Endangered (IUCN 3.1)

Scientific classification
- Kingdom: Plantae
- Clade: Tracheophytes
- Clade: Angiosperms
- Clade: Eudicots
- Order: Proteales
- Family: Proteaceae
- Genus: Banksia
- Subgenus: Banksia subg. Banksia
- Species: B. brownii

Binomial name
- Banksia brownii Baxter ex R.Br.
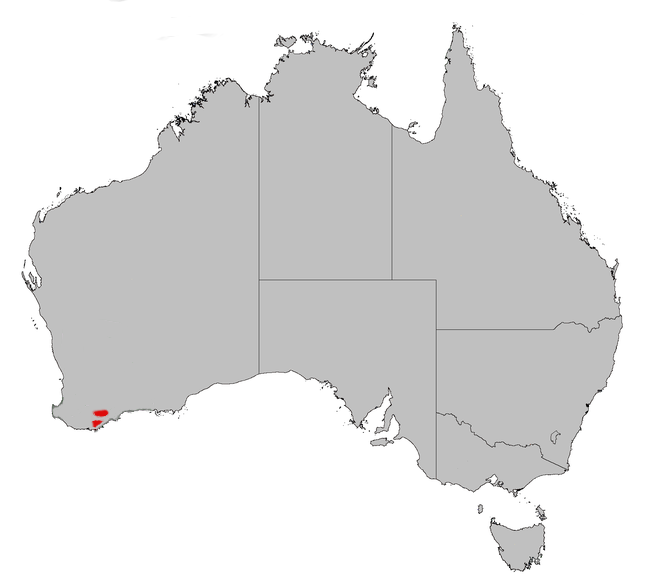
- Distribution of B. brownii within Australia

Synonyms
- Sirmuellera brownei Kuntze orth.var.; Sirmuellera brownii (R.Br.) Kuntze

= Banksia brownii =

Feather-leaved banksia

Species of plant native to Western Australia

Banksia brownii, commonly known as feather-leaved banksia or Brown's banksia, is a species of shrub that grows in southwest Western Australia. A plant with fine feathery leaves and large red-brown flower spikes, it usually grows as an upright bush around two metres (6.6 ft) high, but can also occur as a small tree or a low spreading shrub. First collected in 1829 and published the following year, it is placed in Banksia subgenus Banksia, section Oncostylis, series Spicigerae. There are two genetically distinct forms.

Banksia brownii occurs naturally only in two population clusters between Albany and the Stirling Range in southwest Western Australia. In the Stirling Range it occurs among heath on rocky mountain slopes; further south it occurs among jarrah woodland in shallow nutrient-poor sand. It has been evaluated as critically endangered by the International Union for Conservation of Nature (IUCN); all major populations are threatened by Phytophthora cinnamomi dieback, a disease to which the species is highly susceptible. Other threats include loss of habitat, commercial exploitation and changes to the fire regime. Highly valued by Australia's horticultural and cut flower industries, B. brownii is widely cultivated in areas not exposed to dieback. It prefers a sheltered position in soil with good drainage, and must be provided with some moisture over summer.

== Description ==
Banksia brownii usually grows as an upright bush between one and three metres (3–10 ft) high, but it can also grow as an openly branched small tree to six metres (20 ft) in sheltered gullies, or as a low, spreading shrub in exposed locations such as the peaks of the Stirling Range. The bark is a grey-brown colour, smooth and thin, with lenticels. The leaves are long and thin, from three to ten centimetres (1–5 in) long, and five to ten millimetres (3/16–3/8 in) wide. Dark green and hairless above but with a hairy white underside, they are easily recognised by their feather-like appearance, caused by the fact that they are finely divided almost back to the midrib, into as many as 70 thin tapered lobes.

Flowers occur in typical Banksia "flower spikes", inflorescences made up of hundreds of pairs of flowers densely packed in a spiral around a woody axis. B. brownii's flower spike is a metallic red-brown colour, roughly cylindrical, 6 to 19 centimetres (2–7 1/2 in) high and eight to ten centimetres (3–4 in) wide. Each flower consists of a tubular perianth made up of four united tepals, and one long wiry style. Perianths are cream at the base and grey-brown at the end. Styles are rusty red-brown with a cream tip, and downwardly hooked rather than straight. The style end is initially trapped inside the upper perianth parts, but breaks free at anthesis.

Flower spikes are held erect and are typically terminal on a branch; often other branchlets grow up and around a spike from below. The fruiting structure is a stout woody "cone", around five centimetres (2 inches) in diameter, with a hairy appearance caused by the persistence of old withered flower parts. A "cone" may be embedded with up to 60 follicles, although usually there are very few or even none at all. Unusually for Banksia, each follicle contains just one seed. This is shiny black, oval in shape, about 20 millimetres (3/4 in) long, with a brown papery wing.

== Taxonomy ==
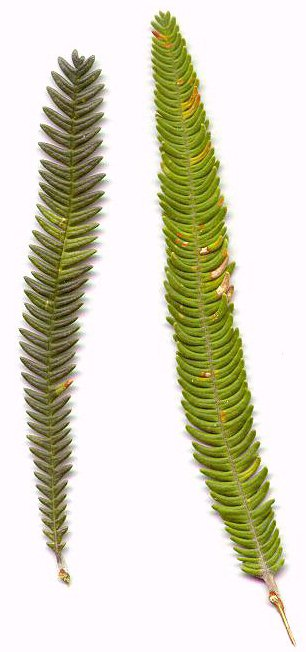
Leaf variation in B. brownii. Left: a leaf of the shrubby "mountain form". Right: a leaf of the upright "Millbrook Road" form.

Banksia brownii was first collected near King George Sound in 1829 by William Baxter, who named it in honour of botanist Robert Brown. A formal description was published by Brown in his 1830 Supplementum Primum Prodromi Florae Novae Hollandiae; thus the full botanic name of the species is Banksia brownii Baxter ex R.Br. Under Brown's taxonomic arrangement, B. brownii was placed in subgenus Banksia verae, the "true banksias", because its inflorescence is a typical Banksia flower spike. Banksia verae was renamed Eubanksia by Stephan Endlicher in 1847.

Carl Meissner demoted Eubanksia to sectional rank in his 1856 classification, and divided it into four series, with B. brownii placed in series Dryandroideae. When George Bentham published his 1870 arrangement in Flora Australiensis, he discarded Meissner's series, placing all the species with hooked styles together in a section that he named Oncostylis. This arrangement would stand for over a century.

In 1891, Otto Kuntze, in his Revisio Generum Plantarum, rejected the generic name Banksia L.f., on the grounds that the name Banksia had previously been published in 1776 as Banksia J.R.Forst & G.Forst, referring to the genus now known as Pimelea. Kuntze proposed Sirmuellera as an alternative, referring to this species as Sirmuellera brownii. This application of the principle of priority was largely ignored by Kuntze's contemporaries, and Banksia L.f. was formally conserved and Sirmuellera rejected in 1940.

Alex George published a new taxonomic arrangement of Banksia in his landmark 1981 monograph The genus Banksia L.f. (Proteaceae). Endlicher's Eubanksia became B. subg. Banksia, and was divided into three sections, one of which was Oncostylis. Oncostylis was further divided into four series, with B. brownii placed in series Spicigerae because its inflorescences are cylindrical.

In 1996, Kevin Thiele and Pauline Ladiges published a new arrangement for the genus, after cladistic analyses yielded a cladogram significantly different from George's arrangement. Thiele and Ladiges' arrangement retained B. brownii in series Spicigerae, placing it in B. subser. Occidentales along with B. occidentalis (red swamp banksia), B. seminuda (river banksia), B. verticillata (granite banksia) and B. littoralis (swamp banksia). This arrangement stood until 1999, when George effectively reverted to his 1981 arrangement in his monograph for the Flora of Australia series.

Under George's taxonomic arrangement of Banksia, B. brownii's taxonomic placement may be summarised as follows:

Genus Banksia

Subgenus Banksia

Section Banksia
Section Coccinea
Section Oncostylis

Series Spicigerae

B. spinulosa - B. ericifolia - B. verticillata - B. seminuda - B. littoralis - B. occidentalis - B. brownii

Series Tricuspidae
Series Dryandroidae
Series Abietinae

Subgenus Isostylis

The closest relative to B. brownii is held to be B. occidentalis, which differs in having smaller, deep red flowers and narrow, sparsely serrate leaves.

Since 1998, Austin Mast has been publishing results of ongoing cladistic analyses of DNA sequence data for the subtribe Banksiinae, which comprises Banksia and Dryandra. With respect to B. brownii, Mast's results are somewhat at odds with those of both George and Thiele and Ladiges, finding it to be more closely related to B. nutans (nodding banksia) and B. quercifolia (oak-leaved banksia) than to many of the Spicigerae. Overall, the inferred phylogeny is very greatly different from George's arrangement, and provides compelling evidence for the paraphyly of Banksia with respect to Dryandra. Early in 2007, Mast and Thiele initiated a rearrangement of Banksia by transferring Dryandra into it, and publishing B. subg. Spathulatae for the species having spoon-shaped cotyledons. They foreshadowed publishing a full arrangement once DNA sampling of Dryandra was complete; in the meantime, if Mast and Thiele's nomenclatural changes are taken as an interim arrangement, then B. brownii is placed in B. subg. Spathulatae.

Three genetically distinct forms of B. brownii are recognised: the better known forms are a "mountain form" with a shrubby habit, short thin hard leaves, and a squat inflorescence; and a "Millbrook Road form", with a tree habit and longer, wider, soft leaves. Some horticulturists also recognise an intermediate form. Recent genetic testing has confirmed the existence of three distinct forms, but as of 2005 these have no taxonomic status.

== Distribution and habitat ==
Banksia brownii occurs between Albany (35°S) and the Stirling Range (34°24'S) in the southwest of Western Australia, at the juncture of the Esperance Plains, Warren and Jarrah Forest biogeographic regions. This is the taxonomically richest area for Banksia, with 19 species, of which six are endemic, including B. brownii itself. It is cool and wet, with temperatures between four and 30 °C (39–86 °F) and rainfall of around 800 millimetres (31 in). The species occurs there in two distinct population clusters: southern populations occur among low woodland of Eucalyptus marginata (jarrah) in shallow, nutrient-poor white or grey sand over laterite; Stirling Range populations occur at altitudes of between 500 and 1100 metres (1640–3960 ft), among heath on rocky mountain slopes and tops, and in shale in gullies.

There are 27 known populations within this region, but only nine of these populations contain more than 10 individual plants, and only five populations have more than 100. Ten populations are now presumed extinct. The total number of plants is estimated at 1000.

== Ecology ==
Coastal plants begin to flower at around five years from seed, but plants in the Stirling Range take much longer to mature. In one Stirling Range population, only 15% of plants had flowered after eight years. Flowering time is highly variable, but in general it occurs between March and August, with a peak around June. More flowers open during the day than at night.

As with other Banksia species, B. brownii is a heavy producer of nectar, and serves as a food source for a range of nectariferous birds, mammals and insects. Honeyeaters such as Phylidonyris novaehollandiae (New Holland honeyeater), Acanthorhynchus superciliosus (western spinebill) and Anthochaera carunculata (red wattlebird) are frequent visitors that often carry heavy pollen loads, making them important pollinators. Nocturnal mammals such as Rattus fuscipes (bush rat) and Tarsipes rostratus (honey possum) also carry heavy pollen loads, but the foraging behaviour of bush rats suggests that these may transfer pollen only over very short distances. Invertebrate visitors include the introduced Apis mellifera (western honeybee), native bees, flies and ants; bees appear to be effective pollinators, but ants and flies forage only at the base of flowers and do not come in contact with plant pollen.

The species is partly self-compatible, as some seed is set when pollinators are excluded. Selection against self-pollinated seed has been observed, but the species has nonetheless been shown to have one of the lowest outcrossing rates of any Banksia. This is probably caused by the small population sizes, which increase the probability of self-fertilisation, and may discourage visits by pollinators.

It has a low rate of fruiting, with less than 1% of flowers developing into follicles, and more than half of the inflorescences failing to form any follicles at all. Seed survival rates are similarly low. More than half of a plant's seed crop may be lost to the larvae of moths and weevils, which burrow into the cobs to eat the seeds and pupate in the follicles; and further seed losses are caused by granivorous birds such as cockatoos, which break off the cobs to eat both the seeds and the insect larvae.

A small proportion of follicles open and release their seed spontaneously, but most remain closed until stimulated to open by bushfire. Bushfire kills the maternal plant, which has neither thick bark nor lignotubers, but the subsequent shedding of seed allows the population to regenerate. Seed predation continues after its release: in one study, B. brownii seeds were placed on the ground in both burnt and unburnt sides; almost all were eaten by parrots within four weeks.

== Conservation ==
Threats to B. brownii include loss of habitat due to land clearing, commercial exploitation, disease, and changes to the fire regime. The fragmentation of populations is also of concern, as it causes the genetic diversity of the species to decline, potentially reducing vigour. Climate change is also of concern: depending on the severity of change, the range of this species is predicted to contract by 30% to 50% by 2080.

Microsatellite markers for assessing population genetic structure were developed for B. brownii in 2009. A subsequent study by these authors, published in 2015, estimated that B. brownii has lost between 35 and 40% of its historical genetic diversity due to P. cinnamomi dieback.

B. brownii has been assessed as having a high risk of extinction, and that this would be "not only a tragedy in itself but may have unforeseen, and potentially disastrous, consequences for the functioning of the vegetation communities of which feather-leaved banksia is an integral part." The species has been formally assessed for the IUCN Red List as "Critically Endangered (CR)"; populations are projected to decline by more than 80% within the next three generations. It was listed as "Endangered" under Australia's Environment Protection and Biodiversity Conservation Act 1999 (EPBC Act), and "Rare" under Western Australia's Wildlife Conservation Act 1950. These acts provide legislative protection against a range of potential threats, including commercial harvesting of flowers and land clearing. Further statutory protection is afforded by the fact that populations occur within the Eastern Stirling Range Montane Heath and Thicket threatened ecological community, which is listed as "Endangered" under the EPBC Act, and the Montane Mallee Thicket of the Stirling Range threatened ecology community, which has been assessed as "Endangered" by the Western Australian government; and by the presence of northern population within the Stirling Range National Park.

A five-year interim management plan was put in place by the Western Australia's Department of Environment and Conservation in October 2005. Actions under that plan include regular monitoring of populations, management of the threats of fire and P. cinnamomi, and the cold storage of seed. This was followed by a national recovery plan. A translocation project was begun in 2008. This has met with some success as one of three original sites established appears to have a viable reproducing population.

As of March 2023 it is listed as "Critically endangered" under the EPBC Act.

=== Disease ===
The main threat to B. brownii is dieback caused by the introduced plant pathogen P. cinnamomi, a soil-borne water mould that causes root rot. Studies of the effect of P. cinnamomi on B. brownii have found it to be "highly susceptible" to dieback, with specimens "frequently and consistently killed in the wild". As of 2007, all major populations of B. brownii, and all but one minor population, are suffering from dieback. Moreover, all populations are in an area vulnerable to dieback, so even the uninfected population is considered under threat. According to Western Australian botanist Byron Lamont, "the demise of this species in the wild appears imminent."

A number of protective measures have been implemented, including site access restrictions, the collection and cold-storage of seed, and the treatment of plants with phosphite. Phosphite boosts the resistance of both infected and uninfected plants, and also acts as a direct fungicide. Aerial spraying of phosphite boosts plant survival and slows the spread of infection, but must be carefully managed as studies have shown that foliar spraying of phosphite adversely affects root and shoot growth. Direct injection of phosphite into the stem of each tree appears to lack this disadvantage, but is costly to administer and restricted to known plants.

Other diseases to which B. brownii is vulnerable include the parasitic fungus Armillaria luteobubalina and the aerial canker fungus Zythiostroma.

=== Fire regime ===
Because B. brownii releases its seed in response to bushfire, it is important that fires occur at intervals that allow the plants to generate plenty of viable seed. The optimum fire interval is around 18 years. If fire occurs too frequently, plants are burned before reaching maturity or before they have produced sufficient seed to ensure regeneration of the population. This may cause populations to decline, or even local extinction. Too-infrequent fire also causes population decline, as more plants die of natural attrition without releasing their seed, resulting in seed wastage.

=== Ex situ conservation measures ===
Because of the difficulty of conserving B. brownii in its present disease-exposed locations, it is an especially suitable candidate for ex situ conservation measures, such as the cold-storage of seed, and the translocation of plants to disease-free locations. Seed of B. brownii has been collected by Western Australia's Threatened Flora Seed Centre, and placed in cold-storage both in Perth and at Kew's Millennium Seed Bank. This includes seed collected from populations that have since become extinct. In 2008, some of this seed was germinated, and seedlings were planted at a location near Albany. Genetic analysis of the seedlings revealed some genetic diversity that was not present in any extant population. The conservation of these seeds had thus preserved some of the species' genetic diversity that would otherwise have been lost through population extinction, providing a powerful example of the importance of seed banking to conservation efforts. A seed orchard was planted in 2007, and by 2010 this had yielded over 400 disease-free, healthy plants, some of which had grown more than three times the rate of those in the wild. A 2007 seedling flowered for the first time at Wakehurst Place in February 2011.

== Cultivation ==
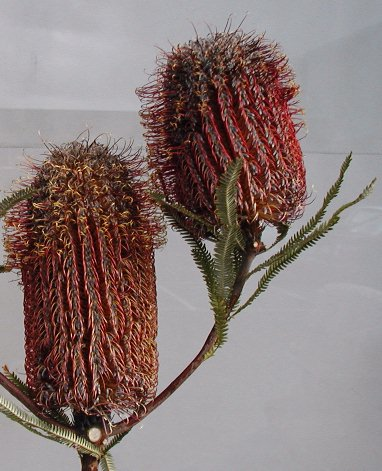
Cut flower spikes from Banksia brownii

With large metallic red inflorescences and attractive feathery leaves that are perhaps the softest of all Banksia species, B. brownii is highly valued by Australia's horticultural and cut flower industries. Seeds and plants are readily available in Australian nurseries, and it is widely cultivated in areas not exposed to dieback. Seeds do not require any treatment, and take 20 to 50 days to germinate. The plant prefers a sheltered position in soil with good drainage, and must be provided with moisture over summer. It grows quickly, but takes several years to flower. Once established, it is frost-tolerant and tolerates light pruning not below the green foliage. The flowers are attractive in late bud, but lose their colour as soon as they open. Because they are usually surrounded by branchlets, they may be partly hidden by foliage.

The main obstacle to cultivation is the species' extreme sensitivity to dieback, which is widespread in suburban gardens. However, the species has been successfully grafted onto a rootstock of B. integrifolia (coast banksia), which renders it hardy on a range of soils.
