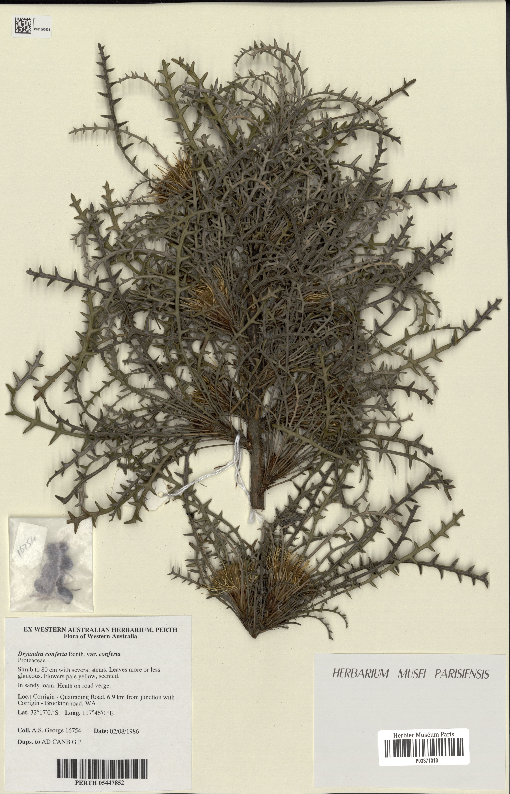
- (specimen from MNHN)

Conservation status
- Priority Two — Poorly Known Taxa (DEC)

Scientific classification
- Kingdom: Plantae
- Clade: Tracheophytes
- Clade: Angiosperms
- Clade: Eudicots
- Order: Proteales
- Family: Proteaceae
- Genus: Banksia
- Subgenus: Banksia subg. Banksia
- Series: Banksia ser. Dryandra
- Species: B. densa

Binomial name
- Banksia densa A.R.Mast & K.R.Thiele

Synonyms
- Dryandra conferta Benth.; Josephia conferta (Benth.)Kuntze

= Banksia densa =

Species of shrub endemic to Western Australia

Banksia densa is a species of column-like shrub that is endemic to Western Australia. It has deeply serrated to pinnatifid leaves, creamy yellow flowers in heads of up to seventy-five, and hairy follicles.

== Description ==
Banksia densa is a shrub, usually with a column-like form that typically grows to a height of 2.5 m (8 ft 2 in) but does not form a lignotuber. It has linear, pinnatifid leaves that are 50–150 mm (2.0–5.9 in) long and 8–15 mm (0.31–0.59 in) wide on a petiole up to 10 mm (0.39 in) long. There are between eight and thirteen sharply pointed linear to triangular lobes up to 9 mm (0.35 in) long on each side of the leaves and the lower surface is covered with woolly white hairs. The flowers are arranged in heads of between forty and seventy-five with rusty-hairy or velvety, linear involucral bracts up to 15 mm (0.59 in) long at the base of the head. The flowers have a creamy yellow, hairy perianth 15–18 mm (0.59–0.71 in) or 21–25 mm (0.83–0.98 in) long, depending on subspecies, and a mostly glabrous pistil 16–26 mm (0.63–1.02 in) long or 25–30 mm (0.98–1.18 in) long. Flowering occurs from May to October and the fruit is a hairy, egg-shaped to elliptical follicle 9–13 mm (0.35–0.51 in) long.

== Taxonomy and naming ==
This species was first formally described in 1870 by George Bentham who gave it the name Dryandra conferta and published the description in Flora Australiensis. The specific epithet (conferta) is from a Latin word meaning "crowded".

In 1996, Alex George described two varieties:

- Dryandra conferta var. conferta with a perianth 21–25 mm (0.83–0.98 in) long and a pistil 25–30 mm (0.98–1.18 in) long and flowers with a mouse-like or honey-like scent;
- Dryandra conferta var. parva with a perianth 15–18 mm (0.59–0.71 in) long and a pistil 16–26 mm (0.63–1.02 in) long.

In 2007, Austin Mast and Kevin Thiele transferred all Dryandra species to Banksia. As there was already a species named Banksia conferta, Mast and Thiele changed the specific epithet to "densa".

The changed names of the varieties are as follows and are accepted at the Australian Plant Census:

- Banksia densa var. densa;
- Banksia densa var. parva;

== Distribution and habitat ==
Banksia densa is widespread in inland parts of the south-west of Western Australia, growing in kwongan, woodland and shrubland between Miling, Cadoux the Porongorups, Bodallin and Mount Holland. Variety parva has a more southerly distribution than var. densa.

== Ecology ==
An assessment of the potential impact of climate change on this species found that its range is likely to contract by between 50% and 80% by 2080, depending on the severity of the change.

== Conservation status ==
This banksia is classified as "Priority Two" by the Western Australian Government Department of Parks and Wildlife meaning that it is poorly known and from only one or a few locations.
