= Banksia prolata subsp. prolata =

Scientific classification
- Kingdom: Plantae
- Clade: Tracheophytes
- Clade: Angiosperms
- Clade: Eudicots
- Order: Proteales
- Family: Proteaceae
- Genus: Banksia
- Species: B. prolata A.R.Mast & K.R.Thiele
- Subspecies: B. p. subsp. prolata

Trinomial name
- Banksia prolata subsp. prolata

Synonyms
- Dryandra longifolia subsp. longifolia

Subspecies of bushy shrub

Banksia prolata subsp. prolata is a subspecies of Banksia prolata. It was known as Dryandra longifolia subsp. longifolia until 2007, when Austin Mast and Kevin Thiele sunk all Dryandra into Banksia. Since the name Banksia longifolia had already been used, Mast and Thiele had to choose a new specific epithet for D. longifolia and hence for this subspecies of it. As with other members of Banksia ser. Dryandra, it is endemic to the South West Botanical Province of Western Australia. As an autonym, it is defined as encompassing the type material of the species.
