= Banksia densa var. densa =

Scientific classification
- Kingdom: Plantae
- Clade: Tracheophytes
- Clade: Angiosperms
- Clade: Eudicots
- Order: Proteales
- Family: Proteaceae
- Genus: Banksia
- Species: B. densa A.R.Mast & K.R.Thiele
- Variety: B. d. var. densa

Trinomial name
- Banksia densa var. densa

Synonyms
- Dryandra conferta var. conferta

Variety of plant found in Australia

Banksia densa var. densa is a variety of Banksia densa. It was known as Dryandra conferta var. conferta until 2007, when Austin Mast and Kevin Thiele sunk all Dryandra into Banksia. Since the name Banksia conferta had already been used, Mast and Thiele had to choose a new specific epithet for D. conferta and hence for this variety of it. As with other members of Banksia ser. Dryandra, it is endemic to the South West Botanical Province of Western Australia. As an autonym, it is defined as encompassing the type material of the species.
