= Banksia densa var. parva =

Scientific classification
- Kingdom: Plantae
- Clade: Tracheophytes
- Clade: Angiosperms
- Clade: Eudicots
- Order: Proteales
- Family: Proteaceae
- Genus: Banksia
- Species: B. densa
- Variety: B. d. var. parva

Trinomial name
- Banksia densa var. parva (A.S.George) A.R.Mast & K.R.Thiele

Synonyms
- Dryandra conferta var. parva A.S.George

Variety of plant found in Australia

Banksia densa var. parva is a variety of Banksia densa. It was known as Dryandra conferta var. parva until 2007, when Austin Mast and Kevin Thiele sunk all Dryandra into Banksia. Since there was already a Banksia named Banksia conferta, Mast and Thiele had to choose a new specific epithet for D. conferta and hence for this variety of it. As with other members of Banksia ser. Dryandra, it is endemic to the South West Botanical Province of Western Australia.
