= Banksia rufa subsp. pumila =

Conservation status
- Declared rare (DEC)

Scientific classification
- Kingdom: Plantae
- Clade: Tracheophytes
- Clade: Angiosperms
- Clade: Eudicots
- Order: Proteales
- Family: Proteaceae
- Genus: Banksia
- Species: B. rufa
- Subspecies: B. r. subsp. pumila

Trinomial name
- Banksia rufa subsp. pumila (A.S.George) A.R.Mast & K.R.Thiele

Synonyms
- Dryandra ferruginea subsp. pumila A.S.George

Subspecies of plant found in Australia

Banksia rufa subsp. pumila is a subspecies of Banksia rufa. It was known as Dryandra ferruginea subsp. pumila until 2007, when Austin Mast and Kevin Thiele sunk all Dryandra into Banksia. Since the name Banksia ferruginea had already been used, Mast and Thiele had to choose a new specific epithet for D. ferruginea and hence for this subspecies of it. As with other members of Banksia ser. Dryandra, it is endemic to the South West Botanical Province of Western Australia.
