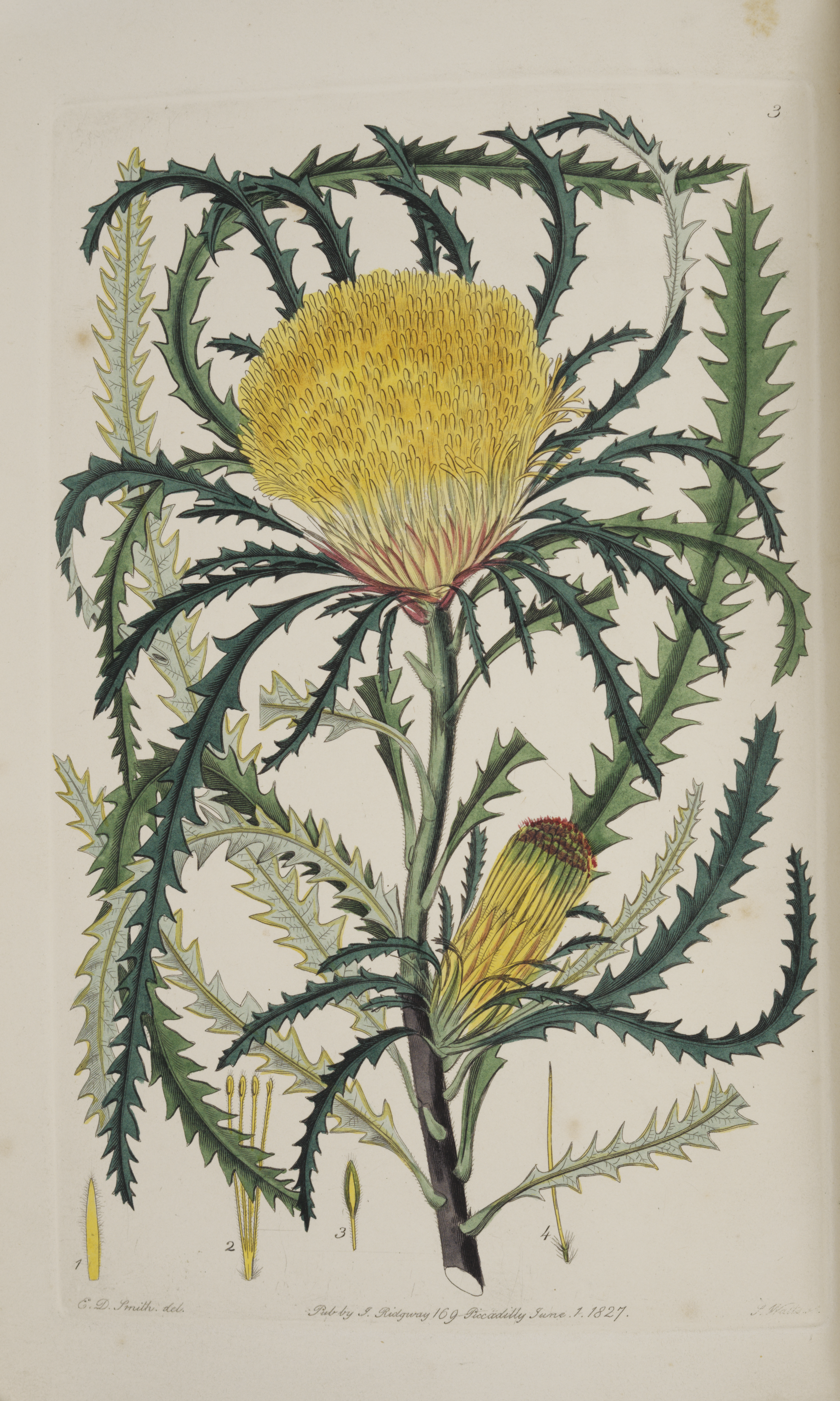
- B. prolata from Robert Sweet's 1828 Flora Australasica

Scientific classification
- Kingdom: Plantae
- Clade: Tracheophytes
- Clade: Angiosperms
- Clade: Eudicots
- Order: Proteales
- Family: Proteaceae
- Genus: Banksia
- Subgenus: Banksia subg. Banksia
- Series: Banksia ser. Dryandra
- Species: B. prolata

Binomial name
- Banksia prolata A.R.Mast & K.R.Thiele

Synonyms
- Dryandra longifolia R.Br.; Josephia longifolia (R.Br.) Poir.

= Banksia prolata =

Species of shrub endemic to Western Australia

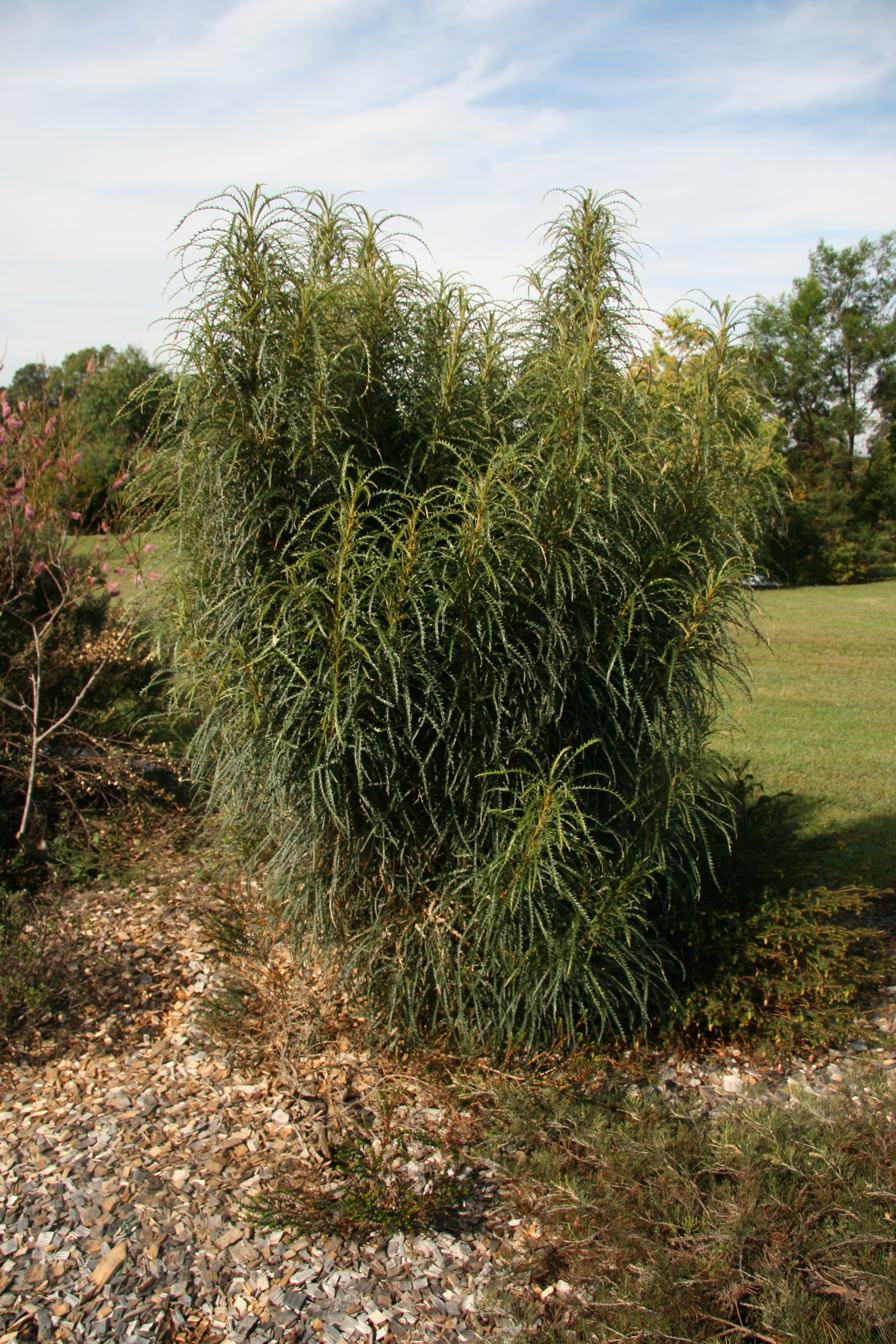
Habit in cultivation

Banksia prolata is a species of bushy shrub that is endemic to Western Australia. It has linear, serrated or pinnatifid leaves, yellow flowers in heads of between 150 and 250, and egg-shaped follicles.

== Description ==
Banksia prolata is a bushy shrub that grows to a height of 0.4–3 m (1 ft 4 in – 9 ft 10 in) but does not form a lignotuber. It has linear, serrated or pinnatifid leaves that are 110–300 mm (4.3–11.8 in) long and 12–18 mm (0.47–0.71 in) wide on a petiole 5–30 mm (0.20–1.18 in) long. There are between six and twenty-one sharply-pointed, triangular teeth on each side of the leaves. The flowers are yellow and borne in heads of between 150 and 250 with hairy, lance-shaped involucral bracts up to 14–30 mm (0.55–1.18 in) long at the base of each head. The perianth is 23–40 mm (0.91–1.57 in) long and the pistil 28–48 mm (1.1–1.9 in) long. Flowering occurs from April to October, and the follicles are egg-shaped and 8–12 mm (0.31–0.47 in) long.

== Taxonomy and naming ==
This species was first formally described in 1810 by Robert Brown who gave it the name Dryandra longifolia and published the description in Transactions of the Linnean Society of London from material collected near Lucky Bay. The specific epithet (longifolia) is derived from the Latin words longus, "long" and folium, "leaf".

In 1996, Alex George described three subspecies of Dryandra longifolia in the journal Nuytsia:

- Dryandra longifolia subsp. archeos A.S.George has flowers with larger organs than those of the other two subspecies, including bracts that are 25–30 mm (0.98–1.18 in) long;
- Dryandra longifolia subsp. calcicola A.S.George is similar to the autonym but has straight bracts up to 20 mm (0.79 in) long;
- Dryandra longifolia R.Br. subsp. longifolia has bracts up to 20 mm (0.79 in) long that curve downwards.

In 2007 Austin Mast and Kevin Thiele transferred all dryandras to the genus Banksia, but since the name Banksia longifolia had already been used (Banksia longifolia Donn ex F.Dietr.), Mast and Thiele gave this species the name Banksia prolata. The epithet (prolata) is from a Latin word meaning "drawn out". The subspecies were named archeos, calcicola and prolata respectively. The names of the subspecies are accepted by the Australian Plant Census.

== Distribution and habitat ==
Subspecies archeos grows among boulders in dense scrub on Mount Arid in the Cape Arid National Park, subspecies calcicola in scrub to the west of Esperance Bay and subspecies longifolia in scrub near granite slopes between Cape Le Grand to Cape Paisley in the Cape Le Grand National Park and on Mondrain Island in the Recherche Archipelago.

== Conservation status ==
Banksia prolata is listed as "not threatened" by the Western Australian Government Department of Parks and Wildlife but subspecies archeos is listed as "Priority Two" meaning that it is poorly known and from only one or a few locations, subspecies calcicola as "Priority Four" meaning that is rare or near threatened and subspecies prolata as "Priority Three" meaning that it is poorly known and known from only a few locations but is not under imminent threat.
