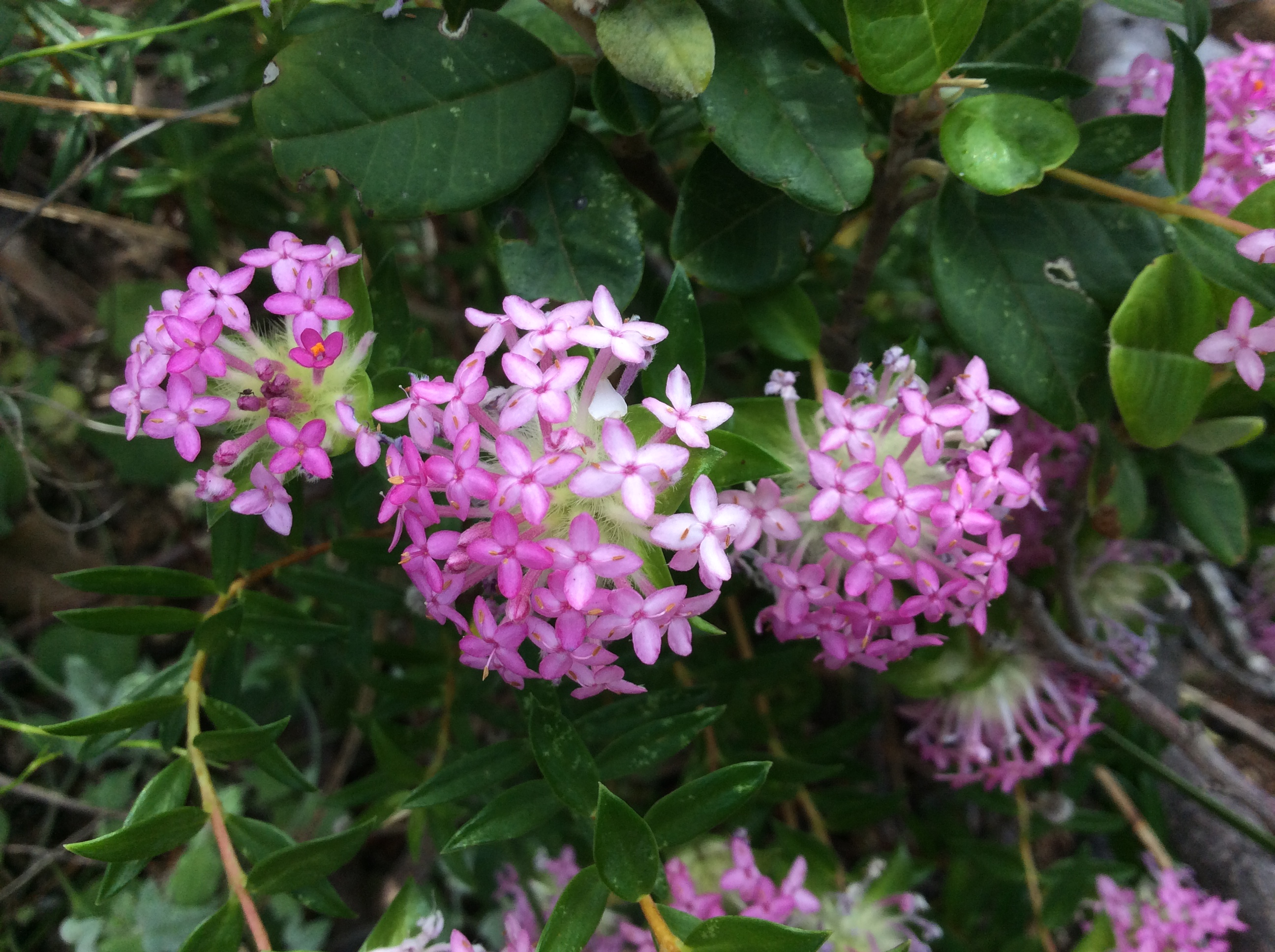
- At Cape Naturaliste

Scientific classification
- Kingdom: Plantae
- Clade: Tracheophytes
- Clade: Angiosperms
- Clade: Eudicots
- Clade: Rosids
- Order: Malvales
- Family: Thymelaeaceae
- Genus: Pimelea
- Species: P. ferruginea

Binomial name
- Pimelea ferruginea Labill.

Synonyms
- Banksia ferruginea (Labill.) Kuntze; Heterolaena decussata C.A.Mey. nom. illeg.; Heterolaena decussata C.A.Mey. var. decussata nom. illeg.; Pimelea decussata R.Br. nom. illeg., nom. superfl.

= Pimelea ferruginea =

Species of shrub

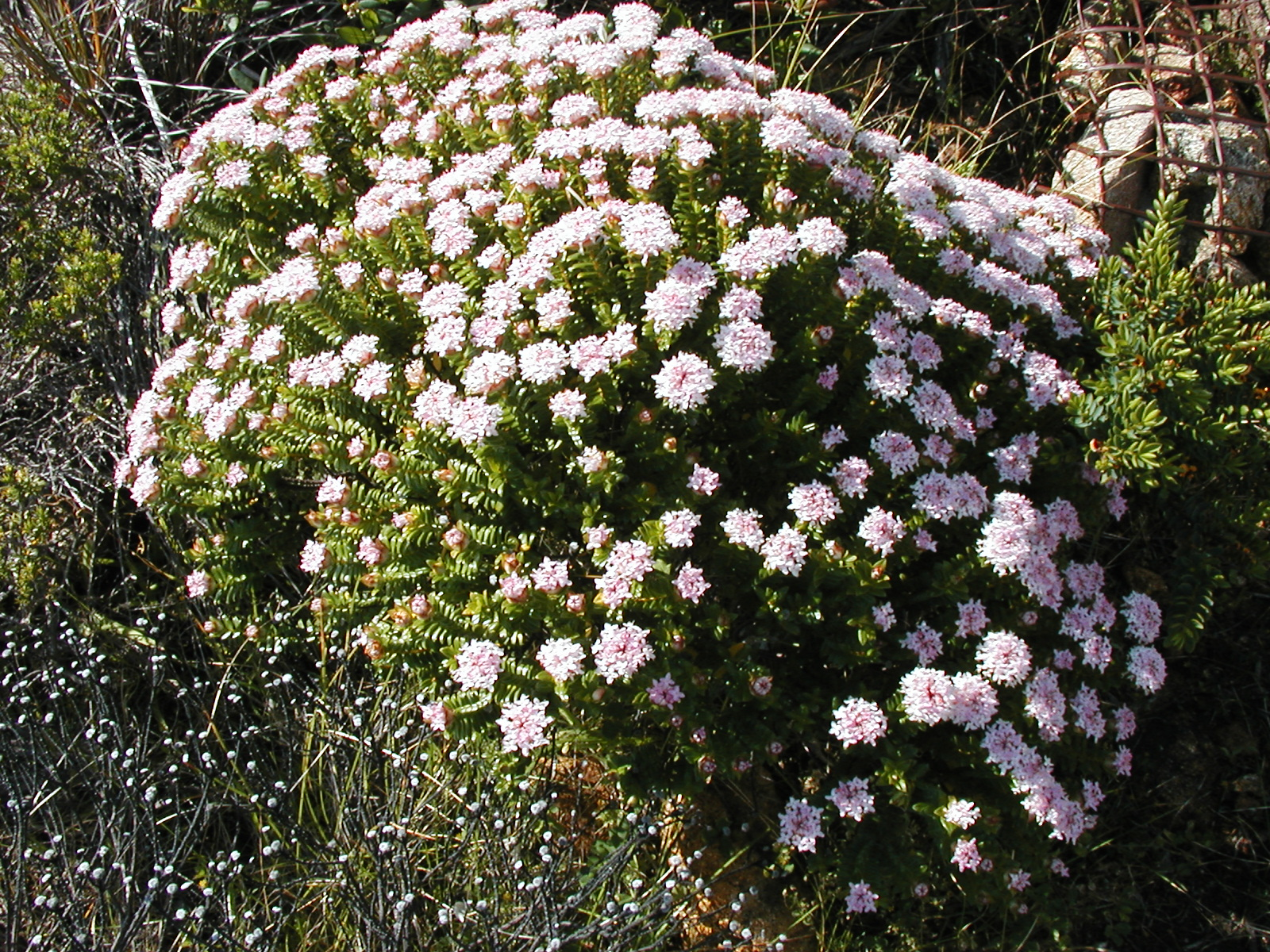
Habit near Yallingup

Pimelea ferruginea, commonly known as pink rice flower or coastal banjine, is a species of flowering plant in the family Thymelaeaceae and is endemic to near-coastal areas of south-western Western Australia. It is a dense, erect shrub with elliptic to narrowly elliptic leaves and head-like clusters of pale to deep pink, tube-shaped flowers.

== Description ==
Pimelea ferruginea is a dense, erect shrub that typically grows to a height of 0.3–1.5 m (1 ft 0 in – 4 ft 11 in) and usually has a single stem at ground level. The leaves are elliptic to narrowly elliptic with the edges curved down, 5–16 mm (0.20–0.63 in) long and 1.5–6.5 mm (0.059–0.256 in) wide on a petiole 0.1–1 mm (0.0039–0.0394 in) long. The flowers are pale to deep pink and borne in erect, head-like clusters on a hairy peduncle 0.5–1.2 mm (0.020–0.047 in) long, surrounded by 4 broadly egg-shaped bracts 5–14 mm (0.20–0.55 in) long, each flower on a hairy pedicel 0.5–1.2 mm (0.020–0.047 in) long. The floral tube is 7–13 mm (0.28–0.51 in) long, the sepals 2.5–4 mm (0.098–0.157 in) long. Flowering mainly occurs from August to February.

== Taxonomy ==
Pimelea ferruginea was first formally described in 1805 by Jacques Labillardière in his Novae Hollandiae Plantarum Specimen. The specific epithet (ferruginea) means "rust-coloured".

== Distribution and habitat ==
Pink rice flower grows on coastal sand dunes and rocky headlands in near-coastal areas between Cliff Head near Arrowsmith, and Point Culver, in the Esperance Plains, Geraldton Sandplains, Jarrah Forest, Mallee, Swan Coastal Plain and Warren bioregions of south-western Western Australia.

== Conservation status ==
Pimelea ferruginea is listed as "not threatened" by the Government of Western Australia Department of Biodiversity, Conservation and Attractions.
