= Banksia prolata subsp. calcicola =

Scientific classification
- Kingdom: Plantae
- Clade: Tracheophytes
- Clade: Angiosperms
- Clade: Eudicots
- Order: Proteales
- Family: Proteaceae
- Genus: Banksia
- Species: B. prolata
- Subspecies: B. p. subsp. calcicola

Trinomial name
- Banksia prolata subsp. calcicola (A.S.George) A.R.Mast & K.R.Thiele

Synonyms
- Dryandra longifolia subsp. calcicola A.S.George

Subspecies of bushy shrub

Banksia prolata subsp. calcicola is a subspecies of Banksia prolata. It was known as Dryandra longifolia subsp. calcicola until 2007, when Austin Mast and Kevin Thiele sunk all Dryandra into Banksia. Since the name Banksia longifolia had already been used, Mast and Thiele had to choose a new specific epithet for D. longifolia and hence for this subspecies of it. As with other members of Banksia ser. Dryandra, it is endemic to the South West Botanical Province of Western Australia.
