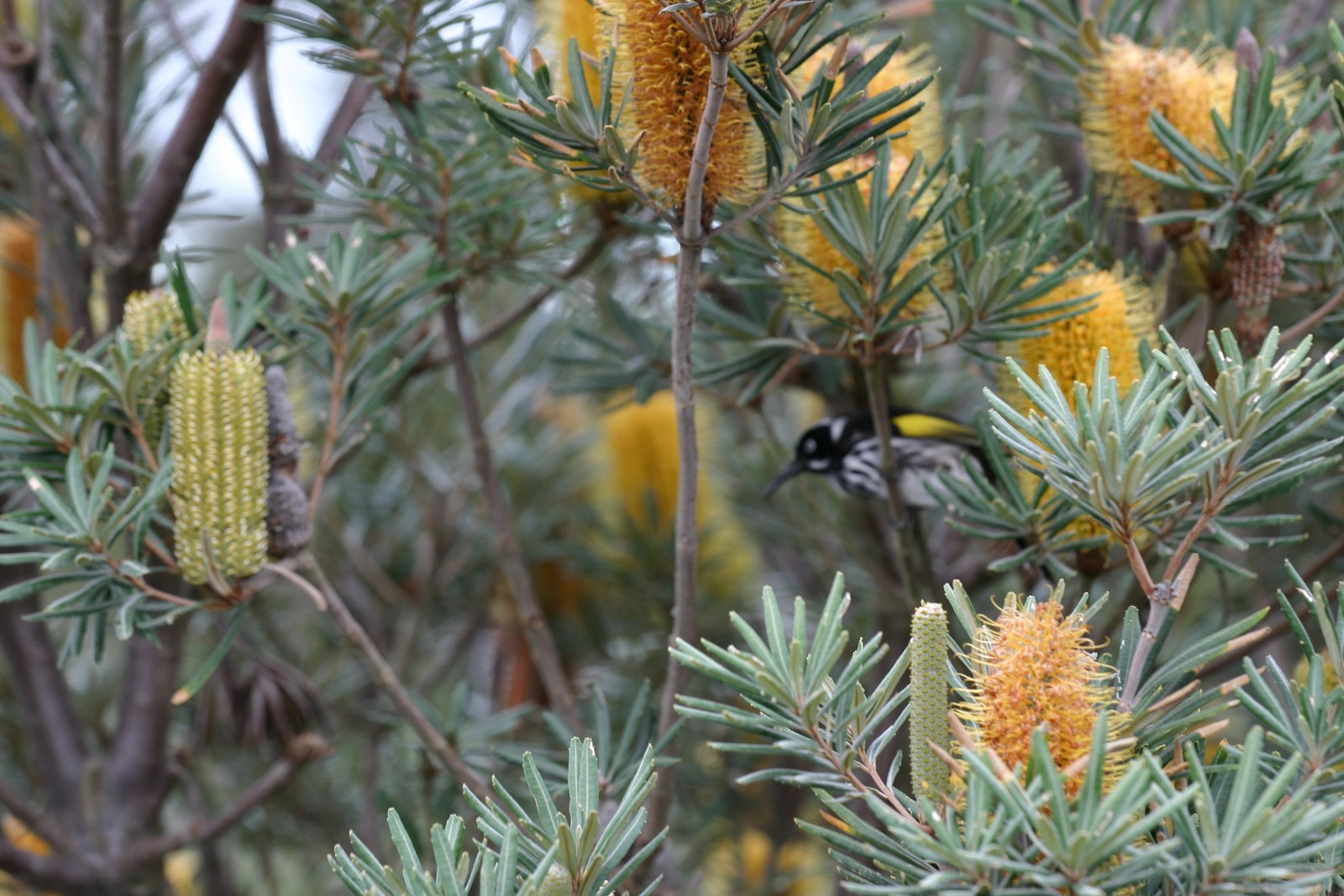

Conservation status
- Vulnerable (EPBC Act)

Scientific classification
- Kingdom: Plantae
- Clade: Embryophytes
- Clade: Tracheophytes
- Clade: Spermatophytes
- Clade: Angiosperms
- Clade: Eudicots
- Order: Proteales
- Family: Proteaceae
- Genus: Banksia
- Species: B. verticillata

Binomial name
- Banksia verticillata R.Br.
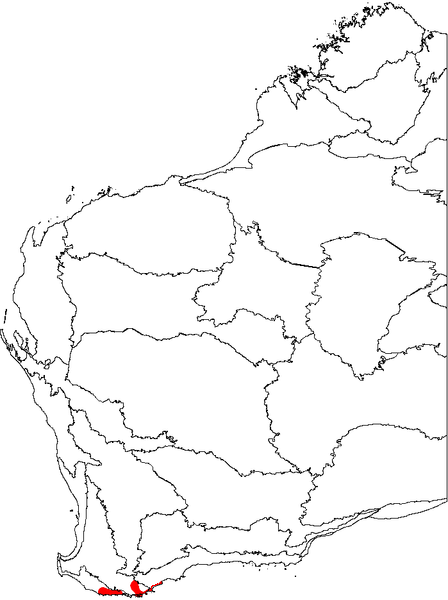
- Distribution of B. verticillata in Western Australia

= Banksia verticillata =

Granite banksia

Species of shrub from Western Australia

Banksia verticillata, commonly known as granite banksia or Albany banksia, is a species of shrub or (rarely) tree of the genus Banksia in the family Proteaceae. It is native to the southwest of Western Australia and can reach up to 3 m (10 ft) in height. It can grow taller to 5 m (16 ft) in sheltered areas, and much smaller in more exposed areas. This species has elliptic green leaves and large, bright golden yellow inflorescences or flower spikes, appearing in summer and autumn. The New Holland honeyeater (Phylidonyris novaehollandiae) is the most prominent pollinator, although several other species of honeyeater, as well as bees, visit the flower spikes.

A declared vulnerable species, it occurs in two disjunct populations on granite outcrops along the south coast of Western Australia, with the main population near Albany and a smaller population near Walpole, and is threatened by dieback (Phytophthora cinnamomi) and aerial canker (Zythiostroma). B. verticillata is killed by bushfire and new plants regenerate from seed afterwards. Populations take over a decade to produce seed and fire intervals of greater than twenty years are needed to allow the canopy seed bank to accumulate.

== Description ==
Banksia verticillata grows as a spreading, bushy shrub with many branches up to 3 m (10 ft) high, but can reach 5 m (16 ft) high in sheltered locations. It may be much lower or even adopt a prostrate habit in highly exposed areas which are blasted by high wind, or occasionally grow as a single-trunked tree. The rough grey bark has fissures, the stems and branches are finely hairy when young and become smooth with age. The leathery bright green leaves are arranged whorled, or alternately on branches, and are borne on 0.5–1.1 mm long petioles. They measure 3–9 cm (1.4–3.8 in) in length, and 0.7–1.2 cm (0.3–0.5 in) in width, and are elliptic in shape with entire (straight) recurved margins. They are initially hairy and become smooth with maturity, although their undersides remain covered with white hair. The golden-yellow inflorescences appear in summer and autumn (January to April) and are 8–20 cm (3–8 in) high and 6.5 cm (2.6 in) wide. The smooth pistils are 3–3.5 cm long and hooked at the end. Individual flowers open from the base of the flower spike, the wave of anthesis moving up the inflorescence. Occasionally, flowers on exposed parts may open early. It takes around 9.5 days for all flowers to open, and rates are similar during the day and night. The inflorescences age to grey and the individual old flowers linger for some time before falling. Up to 100 small woody follicles may follow on old flower spikes. Measuring 1.1–1.5 cm wide, 3–4 mm wide, and jutting out 2–3 mm from the spike, they open after several years, releasing the seed. Follicles more commonly appear in the middle third of the spike. The reasons for this are unknown, although timing of visits by pollinators or some anatomical factor may be relevant.

== Taxonomy ==
=== Discovery and naming ===
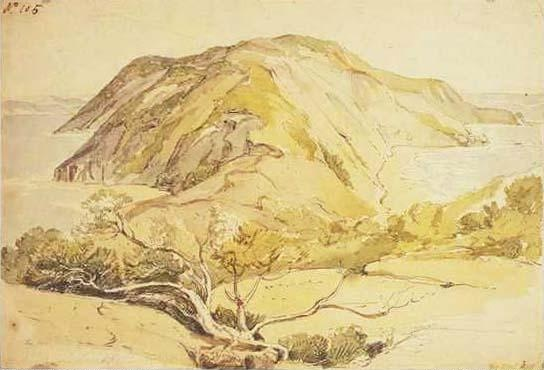
King George's Sound, view on the peninsula to the north of Peak Head, a field sketch executed by William Westall in December 1801. The sprawling shrub in the foreground has been tentatively identified as B. verticillata, which would make this sketch, together with another Westall sketch thought to depict B. verticillata, the earliest known drawings of the species.

The earliest known botanical collection of B. verticillata was made by Scottish surgeon and naturalist Archibald Menzies during the visit of the Vancouver Expedition to King George Sound in September and October 1791. As a result of this collection the species was introduced into cultivation in England, yet it did not result in formal publication of the species.

The next known collection was in December 1801, during the visit of HMS Investigator to King George Sound. Little is known of the circumstances of this collection, other than what is written on the specimen label: "King Georges Sound Dec[embe]r 1801". The specimen is credited to Robert Brown, but gardener Peter Good and the botanical artist Ferdinand Bauer also contributed to Brown's specimen collection, often without attribution. A more precise date and location cannot be given, as neither Brown nor Good mentions the collection in his diary. Bauer did not publish an illustration of the species and his original field sketches are lost, but William Westall appears to have incorporated it into two of his field sketches, and certainly included it in the foreground of one of the oil paintings that he later worked up for the Admiralty.

Brown formally described and named the species in his 1810 On the Proteaceae of Jussieu. He did not identify a type specimen, but the one specimen in his collection has since been formally declared the lectotype for the species. He also did not explicitly give an etymology for the specific epithet, but it is accepted that the name derives from the Latin verticillatus ("whorled"), in reference to the whorled leaf arrangement.

No subspecies or varieties of Banksia verticillata have been identified and it has no taxonomic synonyms. In 1891, Otto Kuntze, in his Revisio Generum Plantarum, rejected the generic name Banksia L.f., on the grounds that the name Banksia had previously been published in 1776 as Banksia J.R.Forst & G.Forst, referring to the genus now known as Pimelea. Kuntze proposed Sirmuellera as an alternative, referring to this species as Sirmuellera verticillata. This application of the principle of priority was largely ignored by Kuntze's contemporaries, and Banksia L.f. was formally conserved and Sirmuellera rejected in 1940.

=== Infrageneric placement ===
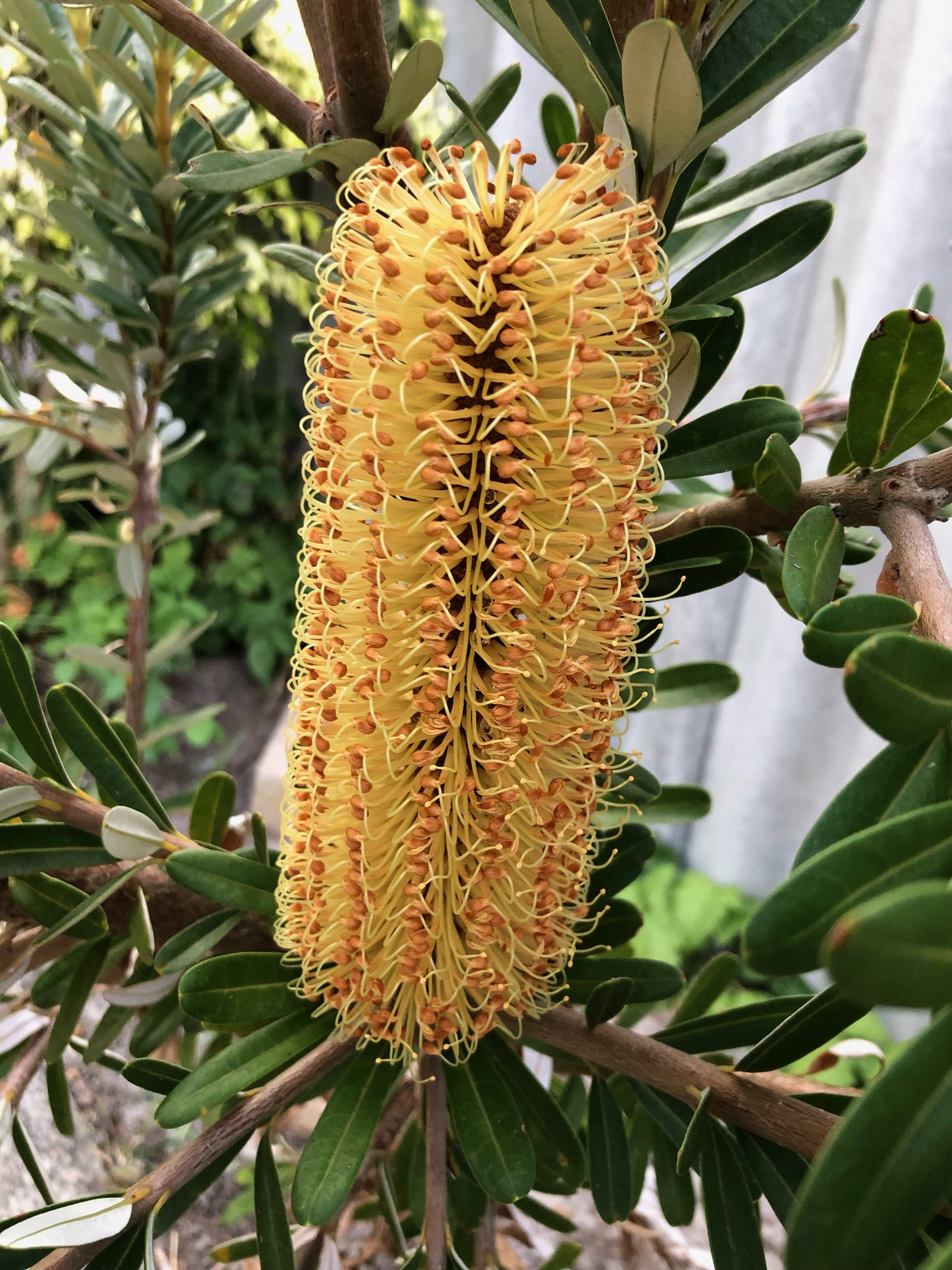
Banksia verticillata flower spike

In Brown's arrangement of Banksia, B. verticillata was placed between B. compar (now B. integrifolia subsp. compar) and B. coccinea (scarlet banksia) in phyletic order. No infrageneric arrangement was provided other than the removal of one distinctive species into a subgenus of its own, because of its unusual domed flower head. As B. verticillata flowers occur in characteristic flower spikes, it was retained in Banksia verae, the "true banksias". Banksia verae was renamed Eubanksia by Austrian botanist Stephan Endlicher in 1847, with B. verticillata remaining between the same two species as in Brown's sequence. A more detailed arrangement was published by Carl Meissner in 1856. Eubanksia was demoted to sectional rank, and divided it into four series. B. verticillata was placed in series Salicinae because its leaves are more or less linear, and have white undersides. Based as they were on leaf characters, Meissner's series were highly heterogeneous, and George Bentham discarded them all in his 1870 revision of Banksia. B. verticillata was instead placed in a new section, Oncostylis, because of its hooked styles. This arrangement would stand for over a century.

For many years there was confusion between B. verticillata and B. littoralis (swamp banksia). Until 1984, the latter was circumscribed as encompassing what is now Banksia seminuda (river banksia), which has whorled leaves like B. verticillata. Thus it was easy to perceive B. verticillata as falling within the range of variation of this broadly defined species. The confusion was largely cleared up once B. seminuda was recognised as a distinct taxon.

Alex George published a new taxonomic arrangement of Banksia in his landmark 1981 monograph The genus Banksia L.f. (Proteaceae). Endlicher's Eubanksia became B. subg. Banksia, and was divided into three sections, one of which was Oncostylis. Oncostylis was further divided into four series, with B. verticillata placed in series Spicigerae because its inflorescences are cylindrical.

In 1996, Kevin Thiele and Pauline Ladiges published a new arrangement for the genus, after cladistic analyses yielded a cladogram significantly different from George's arrangement. With respect to B. verticillata, their findings largely accorded with George's arrangement: section Oncostylis was discarded as polyphyletic, but series Spicigerae was inferred to be monophyletic, and B. verticillata appeared in a succession of clades with the species previously identified as its closest relatives: first B. littoralis, then B. seminuda, then B. brownii, and finally B. occidentalis (red swamp banksia):

- - B. occidentalis
  - - B. brownii
    - - B. seminuda
      - - B. littoralis
        - B. verticillata

This clade became the basis of Thiele and Ladiges' B. subser. Occidentales, which was defined as "characterised by opposite-decussate seedling leaves and adult leaves in true whorls." This arrangement stood until 1999, when George largely reverted to his 1981 arrangement in his monograph for the Flora of Australia series. Under George's taxonomic arrangement of Banksia, B. verticillata's taxonomic placement may be summarised as follows:

Banksia

B. subg. Banksia

B. sect. Banksia (9 series, 50 species, 9 subspecies, 3 varieties)
B. sect. Coccinea (1 species)
B. sect. Oncostylis

B. ser. Spicigerae (7 species, 2 subspecies, 4 varieties)

B. spinulosa (4 varieties)
B. ericifolia (2 subspecies)
B. verticillata
B. seminuda
B. littoralis
B. occidentalis
B. brownii

B. ser. Tricuspidae (1 species)
B. ser. Dryandroideae (1 species)
B. ser. Abietinae (13 species, 2 subspecies, 9 varieties)

B. subg. Isostylis (3 species)

More recent molecular research by Austin Mast and colleagues provide further support of B. verticillata's placement among its nearest relatives, but these do not appear to be closely related to the remaining members of B. ser. Spicigerae, but rather occur in a clade that is sister (next closest relative) to B. nutans:

- - - - B. occidentalis
      - B. littoralis
    - B. brownii
    - B. verticillata
  - - B. nutans var. nutans
    - B. nutans var. cernuella

(B. seminuda is omitted because it was not sampled in the study, not because it occurs elsewhere in the cladogram.)

== Distribution and habitat ==
Banksia verticillata is found in scattered populations in two disjunct segments: one clustered around Walpole, and the other around Albany and eastwards to Cheynes Beach. All but one are located within 2 km (1.5 mi) of the coast, the exception is less than 10 km (6 mi) inland. Plants grow on exposed coastal granite outcrops, often in cracks within boulders as well as shallow rocky soils. It is the only Banksia which grows exclusively in a granite soil. It grows in association with Taxandria marginata, Western Australian peppermint (Agonis flexuosa), Andersonia sprengelioides and species of Hakea in scrub and heath.

== Ecology ==
The New Holland honeyeater (Phylidonyris novaehollandiae) is a major visitor and pollinator of Banksia verticillata. These birds can travel 15 m (50 ft) between inflorescences in a feeding session, and preferentially choose flower spikes with partly opened flowers. Other honeyeater species observed, the white-cheeked honeyeater (Phylidonyris nigra) and western spinebill (Acanthorhynchus superciliosus), visit this species to a much lesser extent. The brown honeyeater (Lichmera indistincta) has also been recorded as a visitor. Small mammals are not major pollinators, although bush rats (Rattus fuscipes) and house mice (Mus musculus) have been recorded. Honey bees (Apis mellifera) visit flower spikes but are not effective pollinators.

B. verticillata is significantly threatened by at least three microorganisms. Several populations have reduced or vanished from dieback (Phytophthora cinnamomi), such as those at Two Peoples Bay Nature Reserve and Gull Rock National Park. The honey fungus Armillaria luteobubalina has killed plants in Torndirrup National Park, and aerial canker (Zythiostroma) has decimated populations at Waychinicup National Park east of Albany.

B. verticillata plants are generally killed by fire and regenerate from seed. A field study after a mild fire in Torndirrup National Park published in 1994 found that plants burnt by fire were ten times as likely to have seedlings come up under their crown as unburnt plants (with an average of 25.2 seedlings per burnt plant), and burnt spikes released double the number of seeds as unburnt spikes. Despite this, interfire recruitment (seedlings arising between fires) has also been recorded, and might be more common than in other Banksia species. Observations at several of the populations showed many plants produced their first seed anywhere from 13 to 17 years of age, leading to a recommendation of 20 years between fires to allow seed banks to accumulate. If fire occurs too frequently, plants are burned before reaching maturity or before they have produced sufficient seed to ensure regeneration of the population. This may cause a population decline or even local extinction. Too long a time between fires also causes population decline, as more plants die of natural attrition without releasing their seed, resulting in seed wastage.

== Conservation ==
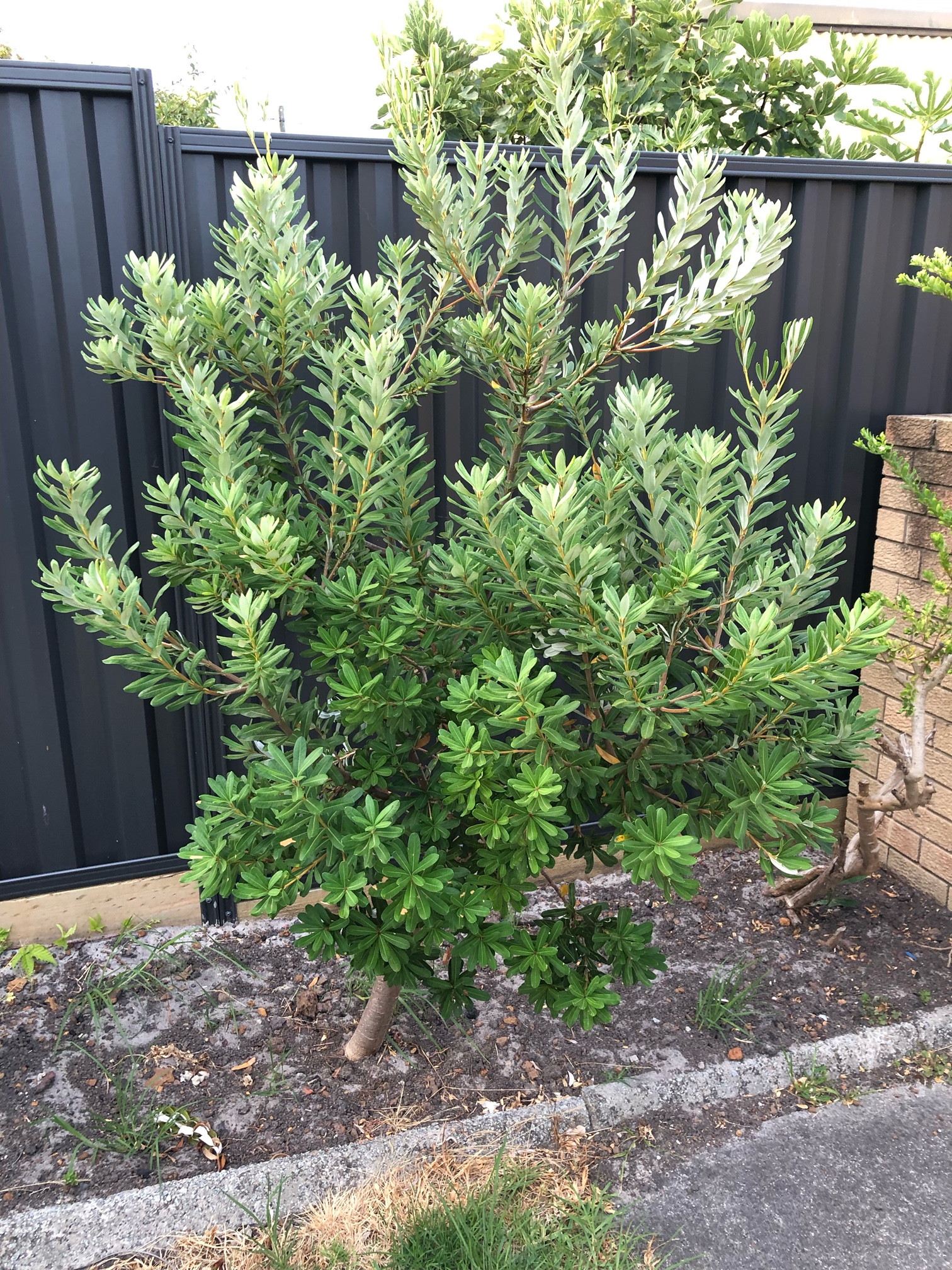
Banksia verticillata growing in a garden in Albany

Banksia verticillata has been declared vulnerable under the federal Environment Protection and Biodiversity Conservation Act 1999, and Rare under Western Australia's Wildlife Conservation Act 1950. A 1995 census yielded an estimated total population size of 4500 plants. Apart from dieback and aerial canker, frequency of bushfires and illegal picking have been cited as threats. Ongoing management includes monitoring of current populations, gathering more data on best response to fire, and restricting access to populations. Seed has been collected from many populations, but germination rates after ten years of storage are much lower than in Banksia brownii. Translocation is considered an option in the future, as is spraying with phosphite, particularly in the vicinity of Walpole. Used successfully on B. brownii but as yet untrialled with B. verticillata, phosphite boosts the resistance of both infected and uninfected plants, and also acts as a direct fungicide. Aerial spraying of phosphite boosts plant survival and slows the spread of infection, but must be carefully managed as studies have shown that foliar spraying of phosphite adversely affects root and shoot growth.

== Cultivation ==
Banksia verticillata is seldom seen in cultivation. The natural growing conditions point to a sunny aspect and good drainage as being important in cultivation. It is good for coastal situations and erosion control. Very sensitive to dieback, B. verticillata (like most other western Australian banksias) perishes quickly in humid conditions or poor drainage. It has been grafted successfully onto Banksia integrifolia. Seeds do not require any treatment, and take 19 to 49 days to germinate.
