= Zythiostroma =

Scientific classification
- Domain: Eukaryota
- Kingdom: Fungi
- Division: Ascomycota
- Class: Sordariomycetes
- Order: Hypocreales
- Family: Nectriaceae
- Genus: Zythiostroma; Höhn. ex Falck (1923)

Type species
- Zythiostroma mougeotii (Fr.) Höhn.

Species
- Z. mougeotii Z. patinelloideum Z. pinastri

Genus of fungi

Zythiostroma is a genus of canker fungus in the family Nectriaceae. The two or three species in the genus, which are anamorphs of the genus Nectria, have been found in Europe and Java.

== Taxonomy ==
The type species Zythiostroma mougeotii was originally described as Sphaeria mougeotii by Elias Magnus Fries in 1828, but was later called Sphaeronaemella mougeotii by Italian mycologist Pier Andrea Saccardo in 1884.

The teleomorph forms of Z. pinastri and Z. mougeotti are Nectria cucurbicula and N. sinopica, respectively.

== Description ==
The mycelium produced by Zythiostroma species is branched, contains septa (partitions that divide cells into compartments), and is pale brown to translucent hyaline. The conidiomata (structures that bear conidia) start their development below the level of the cortex, but eventually appear on the surface, and may be either separate or aggregated. Their shape can be spherical to depressed in the center, although they may collapse irregularly. Conidiomata are red, with irregularly shaped and convoluted compartments. There is a single opening (ostiole) on top of the conidiomata that is circular, and shaped like a pimple. The conidiophores (specialized stalks that hold up the conidiomata) are septate, branched irregularly, cylindrical, tapered to the apices, hyaline, smooth, and formed from the inner wall of the locules. The conidia are acropleurogenous, meaning they develop at the tips and sides of the conidiomata. They are also hyaline, aseptate (without partitions), straight or slightly curved, thin-walled, and do not contain oil droplets.

== Distribution and phytopathology ==
One species has decimated populations of the rare plant Banksia verticillata at Waychinicup National Park east of Albany in Western Australia. One has also been associated with uncommon but severe cankers on Eucalyptus obliqua in Tasmania. Zythiostroma mougeotii has been found associated with Rosaceae species in eastern Westphalia, Germany. The species Z. pinastrum was one of several fungal pathogens found growing on the shoots of the common yew (Taxus baccata) in the Botanical Garden in Kraków in Poland.

== Bioactive compounds ==
An unidentified Zythiostroma species, isolated from an aspen, was shown to produce the diterpenoid compounds zythiostromic acid A, zythiostromic acid B, and zythiostromolid when grown in liquid culture. These chemicals have what is known as a cleistanthane skeleton, a structure previously only reported from plant sources. The Zythiostroma species from which the compounds were isolated has antifungal effects against the growth of the blue stain fungus Ophiostroma crassivaginatum.
