= Foliar feeding =

Plant feeding technique

Foliar feeding is a technique of feeding plants by applying liquid fertilizer directly to the leaves. Plants are able to absorb essential elements through their leaves. The absorption takes place through their stomata and also through their epidermis. Transport is usually faster through the stomata, but total absorption may be as great through the epidermis. Plants are also able to absorb nutrients through their bark.

Foliar feeding was earlier thought to damage tomatoes, but has become standard practice.

== Effectiveness ==
H. B. Tukey was head of Michigan State University (MSU) Department of Horticulture in the 1950s. Working with S. H. Wittwer, they demonstrated that foliar feeding is effective. Radioactive phosphorus and potassium were applied to foliage. A Geiger counter was used to observe absorption, movement and nutrient utilization. The nutrients were transported at the rate of about one foot per hour to all parts of the plants.

A spray enhancer, called a surfactant, can help nutrients stick to the leaf and then penetrate the leaves' cuticle.

Foliar application has been shown to avoid the problem of leaching-out in soils and prompts a quick reaction in the plant. Foliar application of phosphorus, zinc, and iron brings the greatest benefit in comparison with addition to soil where phosphorus becomes fixed in a form inaccessible to the plant and where zinc and iron are less available.

== Use ==
Foliar feeding is generally done in the early morning or late evening, preferably at temperatures below 24 °C (75 °F), because heat causes the pores on some species' leaves to close.
