= George's taxonomic arrangement of Dryandra =

1996 arrangement of Australian plant series

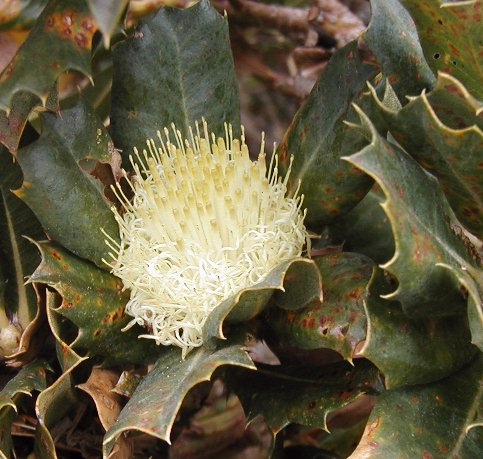
Banksia sessilis (Parrotbush), formerly Dryandra sessilis

Alex George's taxonomic arrangement of Dryandra was the first modern-day arrangement of that taxon. First published in Nuytsia in 1996, it superseded the arrangement of George Bentham, which had stood for over a hundred years; it would later form the basis for George's 1999 treatment of Dryandra for the Flora of Australia. In accordance with contemporary thinking, George treated Dryandra as a genus, dividing it into three subgenera, the largest of which was divided into 24 series. The arrangement stood until 2007, when Dryandra was transferred into Banksia as B. ser. Dryandra. No alternative has yet been proposed.

== Background ==
The dryandras are a group of 94 species in the plant family Proteaceae. Endemic to south-west Western Australia, they grow in forms varying from prostrate shrubs to small trees. Dryandra was originally published at genus rank in 1810, and was still considered a genus in the 1990s when George published his infrageneric classification.

== George's arrangement ==
George's arrangement of Dryandra was first published in his 1996 article "New taxa and a new infragenetic classification in Dryandra R.Br. (Proteaceae: Grevilleoideae)", which was published in Nuytsia 10(3). This formed the basis for his 1999 treatment of Dryandra for the Flora of Australia series, in which he published one new species. In 2005, he published a further six new taxa.

George's arrangement remained current until Austin Mast and Kevin Thiele transferred Dryandra into Banksia in 2007. Mast and Thiele were not then ready to tender a new arrangement, so as an interim measure they transferred Dryandra into Banksia at series, thus minimising the nomenclatural disruption of the transfer. Thus George's taxonomic arrangement of Dryandra was set aside. In effecting the transfer, Mast and Thiele overlooked the six taxa published by George in 2005; these taxa thus retain their original, and now invalid, names.

George's 1999 taxonomic arrangement of Dryandra, with 2005 amendments, is as follows:

Genus Dryandra (now Banksia ser. Dryandra)

Subgenus Dryandra

Series Floribundae

D. sessilis (now B. sessilis)

D. sessilis var. sessilis (now B. sessilis var. sessilis)
D. sessilis var. flabellifolia (now B. sessilis var. flabellifolia)
D. sessilis var. cordata (now B. sessilis var. cordata)
D. sessilis var. cygnorum (now B. sessilis var. cygnorum)

Series Armatae

D. cuneata (now B. obovata)
D. fuscobractea (now B. fuscobractea)
D. armata (now B. armata)

D. armata var. armata (now B. armata var. armata)
D. armata var. ignicida (now B. armata var. ignicida)

D. prionotes (now B. prionophylla
D. arborea (now B. arborea)
D. hirsuta (now B. hirta)
D. pallida (now B. pallida)
D. purdieana (now B. purdieana)
D. xylothemelia (now B. xylothemelia)
D. cirsioides (now B. cirsioides)
D. acanthopoda (now B. acanthopoda)
D. squarrosa (now B. squarrosa)

D. squarrosa subsp. squarrosa (now B. squarrosa subsp. squarrosa)
D. squarrosa subsp. argillacea (now B. squarrosa subsp. argillacea)

D. hewardiana (now B. hewardiana)
D. wonganensis (now B. wonganensis)
D. trifontinalis (now B. trifontinalis)
D. stricta (now B. strictifolia)
D. echinata (now B. echinata)
D. polycephala (now B. polycephala)
D. subpinnatifida (now B. subpinnatifida)

D. subpinnatifida var. subpinnatifida (now B. subpinnatifida var. subpinnatifida)
D. subpinnatifida var. imberbis (now B. subpinnatifida var. imberbis)

D. longifolia (now B. prolata)

D. longifolia subsp. longifolia (now B. prolata subsp. prolata)
D. longifolia subsp. calcicola (now B. prolata subsp. calcicola)
D. longifolia subsp. archeos (now B. prolata subsp. archeos)

D. borealis (now B. borealis)

D. borealis subsp. borealis (now B. borealis subsp. borealis)
D. borealis subsp. elatior (now B. borealis subsp. elatior)

Series Marginatae

D. pulchella (now B. bella)

Series Folliculosae

D. fraseri (now B. fraseri)

D. fraseri var. fraseri (now B. fraseri var. fraseri)
D. fraseri var. crebra (now B. fraseri var. crebra)
D. fraseri var. effusa (now B. fraseri var. effusa)
D. fraseri var. ashbyi (now B. fraseri var. ashbyi)
D. fraseri var. oxycedra (now B. fraseri var. oxycedra)

Series Acrodontae

D. sclerophylla (now B. sclerophylla)
D. kippistiana (now B. kippistiana)

D. kippistiana var. kippistiana (now B. kippistiana var. kippistiana)
D. kippistiana var. paenepeccata (now B. kippistiana var. paenepeccata)

D. carlinoides (now B. carlinoides)
D. tridentata (now B. tridentata)

Series Capitellatae

D. serratuloides (now B. serratuloides)

D. serratuloides subsp. serratuloides (now B. serratuloides subsp. serratuloides)
D. serratuloides subsp. perissa (now B. serratuloides subsp. perissa)

D. meganotia (now B. meganotia)

Series Ilicinae

D. praemorsa (now B. undata)

D. praemorsa var. praemorsa (now B. undata var. undata)
D. praemorsa var. splendens (now B. undata var. splendens)

D. quercifolia (now B. heliantha)
D. anatona (now B. anatona)

Series Dryandra

D. formosa (now B. formosa)
D. nobilis (now B. nobilis)

D. nobilis subsp. nobilis (now B. nobilis subsp. nobilis)
D. nobilis subsp. fragrans (now B. nobilis subsp. fragrans)

D. stuposa (now B. stuposa)

Series Foliosae

D. mucronulata (now B. mucronulata)

D. mucronulata subsp. mucronulata (now B. mucronulata subsp. mucronulata)
D. mucronulata subsp. retrorsa (now B. mucronulata subsp. retrorsa)

D. baxteri (now B. biterax)
D. foliosissima (now B. foliosissima)

Series Decurrentes

D. comosa (now B. comosa)

Series Tenuifoliae

D. tenuifolia (now B. tenuis)

D. tenuifolia var. tenuifolia (now B. tenuis var. tenuis)
D. tenuifolia var. reptans (now B. tenuis var. reptans)

D. obtusa (now B. obtusa)

Series Runcinatae

D. ferruginea (now B. rufa)

D. ferruginea subsp. magma (now B. rufa subsp. magma)
D. ferruginea subsp. tutanningensis (now B. rufa subsp. tutanningensis)
D. ferruginea subsp. ferruginea (now B. rufa subsp. rufa)
D. ferruginea subsp. pumila (now B. rufa subsp. pumila)
D. ferruginea subsp. obliquiloba (now B. rufa subsp. obliquiloba)
D. ferruginea subsp. chelomacarpa (now B. rufa subsp. chelomacarpa)
D. ferruginea subsp. flavescens (now B. rufa subsp. flavescens)

D. corvijuga (now B. corvijuga)
D. epimicta (now B. epimicta)
D. proteoides (now B. proteoides)

Series Triangulares

D. drummondii (now B. drummondii)

D. drummondii subsp. drummondii (now B. drummondii subsp. drummondii)
D. drummondii subsp. hiemalis (now B. drummondii subsp. hiemalis)
D. drummondii subsp. macrorufa (now B. drummondii subsp. macrorufa)

D. octotriginta (now B. octotriginta)
D. catoglypta (now B. catoglypta)

Series Aphragma

D. pteridifolia (now B. pteridifolia)

D. pteridifolia subsp. inretita (now B. pteridifolia subsp. inretita)
D. pteridifolia subsp. pteridifolia (now B. pteridifolia subsp. pteridifolia)
D. pteridifolia subsp. vernalis (now B. pteridifolia subsp. vernalis)

D. fililoba (now B. fililoba)
D. shanklandiorum (now B. shanklandiorum)
D. nervosa (now B. alliacea)
D. blechnifolia (now B. pellaeifolia)
D. porrecta (now B. porrecta)
D. aurantia (now B. aurantia)
D. calophylla (now B. calophylla)
D. lepidorhiza (now B. lepidorhiza)

Series Ionthocarpae

D. ionthocarpa (now B. ionthocarpa)

D. ionthocarpa subsp. ionthocarpa (now B. ionthocarpa subsp. ionthocarpa)
D. ionthocarpa subsp. chrysophoenix (now B. ionthocarpa subsp. chrysophoenix)

Series Inusitatae

D. idiogenes (now B. idiogenes)

Series Subulatae

D. subulata (now B. subulata)

Series Gymnocephalae

D. cynaroides (now B. cynaroides)
D. erythrocephala (now B. erythrocephala)

D. erythrocephala var. erythrocephala (now B. erythrocephala var. erythrocephala)
D. erythrocephala var. inopinata (now B. erythrocephala var. inopinata)

D. horrida (now B. horrida)
D. vestita (now B. vestita)
D. viscida (now B. viscida)
D. mimica (now B. mimica)
D. speciosa (now B. splendida)

D. speciosa subsp. speciosa (now B. speciosa subsp. splendida)
D. speciosa subsp. macrocarpa (now B. speciosa subsp. macrocarpa)

D. shuttleworthiana (now B. shuttleworthiana)

Series Plumosae

D. plumosa (now B. plumosa)

D. plumosa subsp. plumosa (now B. plumosa subsp. plumosa)
D. plumosa subsp. denticulata (now B. plumosa subsp. denticulata)

D. pseudoplumosa (now B. pseudoplumosa)
D. montana (now B. montana)

Series Concinnae

D. concinna (now B. concinna)
D. serra (now B. serra)
D. foliolata (now B. foliolata)

Series Obvallatae

D. fasciculata (now B. fasciculata)
D. conferta (now B. densa)

D. conferta var. conferta (now B. densa var. densa)
D. conferta var. parva (now B. densa var. parva)

D. columnaris (now B. columnaris)
D. platycarpa (now B. platycarpa)
D. seneciifolia (now B. seneciifolia)
D. rufistylis (now B. rufistylis)
D. insulanemorecincta (now B. insulanemorecincta)

Series Pectinatae

D. nana (now B. nana)

Series Acuminatae

D. preissii (now B. acuminata)

Series Niveae

D. arctotidis (now B. arctotidis)
D. tortifolia (now B. tortifolia)
D. stenoprion (now B. stenoprion)
D. cypholoba (now B. cypholoba)
D. lindleyana (now B. dallanneyi)

D. lindleyana subsp. lindleyana (now B. dallanneyi subsp. dallanneyi)
D. lindleyana subsp. pollosta (now B. dallanneyi subsp. pollosta)
D. lindleyana subsp. media (now B. dallanneyi subsp. media)
D. lindleyana subsp. agricola (now B. dallanneyi subsp. agricola)
D. lindleyana subsp. sylvestris (now B. dallanneyi subsp. sylvestris)

D. brownii (now B. brunnea)
D. nivea (now B. nivea)

D. nivea subsp. nivea (now B. nivea subsp. nivea)
D. nivea subsp. uliginosa (now B. nivea subsp. uliginosa)

Subgenus Hemiclidia

D. falcata (now B. falcata)
D. glauca (now B. glaucifolia)

Subgenus Diplophragma

D. bipinnatifida (now B. bipinnatifida)

== See also ==
- Brown's taxonomic arrangement of Dryandra
- Meissner's taxonomic arrangement of Dryandra
- Bentham's taxonomic arrangement of Dryandra
