= List of Banksia ser. Dryandra species =

Series of plants species native to Australia

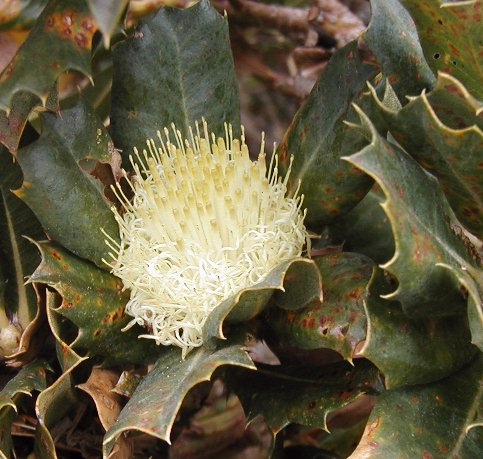
Inflorescence of Banksia sessilis (parrotbush), a species in Banksia ser. Dryandra

Banksia ser. Dryandra is a large series in the plant genus Banksia. It was treated at genus rank as Dryandra until 2007, when molecular evidence of paraphyly presented by Austin Mast and Kevin Thiele, the genus Dryandra was sunk into Banksia as a series within B. subg. Banksia.

Before 2007, 94 Dryandra species were recognised. In the transfer into Banksia, D. prionotes was overlooked, and B. subulata (awled honeypot) was transferred incertae sedis rather than in B. ser. Dryandra. D. prionotes has since been transferred into Banksia as Banksia prionophylla, but it was not explicitly placed in B. ser. Dryandra. The series therefore now consists of 92 species.

This is a list of Banksia ser. Dryandra species:

- Banksia acanthopoda
- Banksia acuminata
- Banksia alliacea
- Banksia anatona
- Banksia arborea (Yilgarn dryandra)
- Banksia arctotidis
- Banksia armata (prickly dryandra)
- Banksia aurantia
- Banksia bella (Wongan dryandra)
- Banksia bipinnatifida
- Banksia biterax
- Banksia borealis
- Banksia brunnea
- Banksia calophylla
- Banksia carlinoides (pink dryandra)
- Banksia catoglypta
- Banksia cirsioides
- Banksia columnaris
- Banksia comosa (Wongan dryandra)
- Banksia concinna
- Banksia corvijuga
- Banksia cynaroides
- Banksia cypholoba
- Banksia dallanneyi (couch honeypot)
- Banksia densa
- Banksia drummondii (Drummond's banksia)
- Banksia echinata
- Banksia epimicta
- Banksia erythrocephala
- Banksia falcata (prickly dryandra)
- Banksia fasciculata
- Banksia fililoba
- Banksia foliolata
- Banksia foliosissima
- Banksia formosa (showy banksia)
- Banksia fraseri
- Banksia fuscobractea
- Banksia glaucifolia
- Banksia heliantha (oak-leaved dryandra)
- Banksia hewardiana
- Banksia hirta
- Banksia horrida (prickly dryandra)
- Banksia idiogenes
- Banksia insulanemorecincta
- Banksia ionthocarpa
- Banksia kippistiana
- Banksia lepidorhiza
- Banksia meganotia
- Banksia mimica (summer honeypot)
- Banksia montana
- Banksia mucronulata (swordfish dryandra)
- Banksia nana (dwarf dryandra)
- Banksia nivea (honeypot dryandra)
- Banksia nobilis (golden dryandra)
- Banksia obovata (wedge-leaved dryandra)
- Banksia obtusa (shining honeypot)
- Banksia octotriginta
- Banksia pallida
- Banksia pellaeifolia
- Banksia platycarpa
- Banksia plumosa
- Banksia polycephala (many-headed dryandra)
- Banksia porrecta
- Banksia prolata
- Banksia proteoides (king dryandra)
- Banksia pseudoplumosa
- Banksia pteridifolia (tangled honeypot)
- Banksia purdieana
- Banksia rufa
- Banksia rufistylis
- Banksia sclerophylla
- Banksia seneciifolia
- Banksia serra (serrate-leaved dryandra)
- Banksia serratuloides
- Banksia sessilis (parrot bush)
- Banksia shanklandiorum
- Banksia shuttleworthiana (bearded dryandra)
- Banksia splendida (shaggy dryandra)
- Banksia squarrosa (pingle)
- Banksia stenoprion
- Banksia strictifolia
- Banksia stuposa
- Banksia subpinnatifida
- Banksia tenuis
- Banksia tortifolia
- Banksia tridentata (yellow dryandra)
- Banksia trifontinalis (Three Springs dryandra)
- Banksia undata (urchin dryandra)
- Banksia vestita (summer dryandra)
- Banksia viscida (sticky dryandra)
- Banksia wonganensis
- Banksia xylothemelia

== See also ==
Prior to the 2007 transfer into Banksia, a number of rich infrageneric arrangements of Dryandra had been published; see:

- Brown's taxonomic arrangement of Dryandra (1810, 1830)
- Meissner's taxonomic arrangement of Dryandra (1856)
- Bentham's taxonomic arrangement of Dryandra (1870)
- George's taxonomic arrangement of Dryandra (1996)
