= Dryandra ser. Aphragma =

Obsolete series of plants

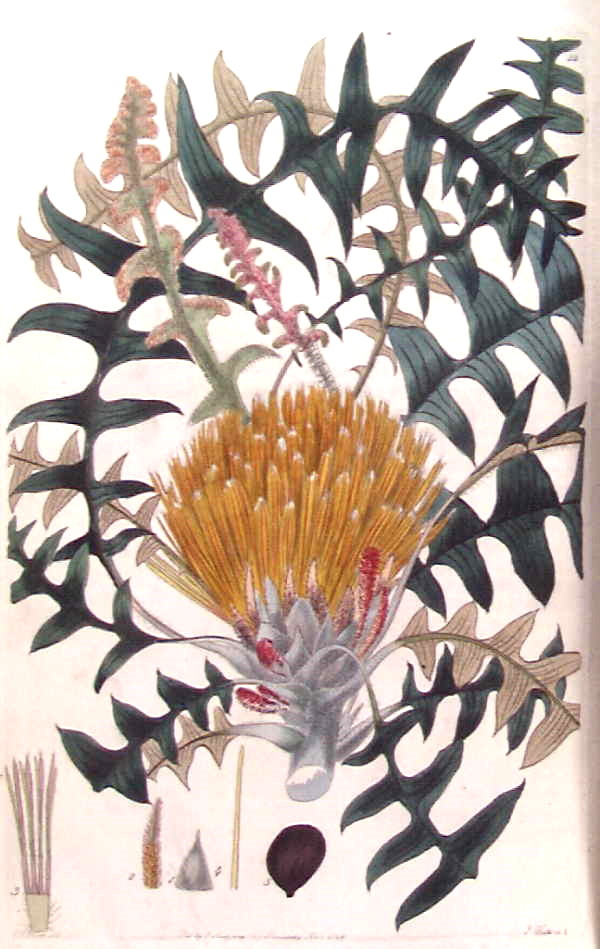
Dryandra nervosa (now Banksia alliacea), the type species of D. ser. Aphragma

Dryandra ser. Aphragma is an obsolete series within the former genus Dryandra (now Banksia ser. Dryandra). It was first published at sectional rank by Robert Brown in 1830, and was retained at that rank until 1999, when Alex George demoted it to a series. It was discarded in 2007 when Austin Mast and Kevin Thiele sank Dryandra into Banksia.

== According to Brown ==
Aphragma was first published by Brown in his 1830 Supplementum primum prodromi florae Novae Hollandiae. Brown's arrangement divided Dryandra into three groups according to what Brown perceived to be variations in the number of seed separators. He allowed for these groups to be treated at subgenus or section rank, but they are now treated as having been published as sections.

D. sect. Aphragma was defined as containing four species which Brown thought lacked seed separators. The epithet Aphragma is from the Greek a- ("without") and phragma ("barrier"). The placement and circumscription of D. sect. Aphragma in Brown's 1830 arrangement may be summarised as follows:

Dryandra (now B. ser. Dryandra)

Dryandra verae (18 species)
D. sect. Diplophragma (1 species)
D. sect. Aphragma

D. nervosa (now B. alliacea)
D. callophylla (now B. calophylla)
D. pteridifolia (now B. pteridifolia)
D. blechnifolia (now B. pellaeifolia)

Hemiclidia (1 species)

== According to Meissner ==
In 1856, Carl Meissner published a revision of Dryandra. He retained all three of Brown's sections, and the circumscription given to D. sect. Aphragma was much the same, the only differences being the demotion of D. blechnifolia to a variety of D. pteridifolia, and the inclusion of D. drummondii (now B. drummondii), which had been published in 1848. The placement and circumscription of D. sect. Aphragma in Meissner's arrangement thus looks like this:

Dryandra (now Banksia ser. Dryandra)

D. sect. Eudryandra (8 series, 47 species, 7 varieties)
D. sect. Diplophragma (2 species)
D. sect. Aphragma

D. pteridifolia (now B. pteridifolia)

D. pteridifolia var. blechnifolia (now B. pellaeifolia)

D. calophylla (now B. calophylla)

D. calophylla var. acaulis (now B. drummondii subsp. drummondii)

D. nervosa (now Banksia alliacea)
D. drummondii (now Banksia drummondii)

Hemiclidia (1 species)

== According to Bentham ==
D. sect. Aphragma was retained by George Bentham in his 1870 arrangement, making it the only one of Meissner's infrageneric taxa not to be discarded. However, Bentham reasoned that the single seed separator in D. sect. Eudryandra was formed by the joining together of the outer seed coat of each seed; and therefore both D. bipinnatifida, in which there appears to be two plates, and D. sect. Aphragma, in which there appears to be none, represent failure of the seed coats to join. On these grounds he transferred D. bipinnatifida into D. sect. Aphragma. Thus D. sect. Aphragma was redefined as containing those species in which "Outer integuments of the two seeds not connate or readily separable from each other." He also noted that the members of this section have large involucres with many broad bracts, giving them "a different aspect from all others of the genus".

The placement and circumscription of D. sect. Aphragma in Bentham's arrangement is as follows:

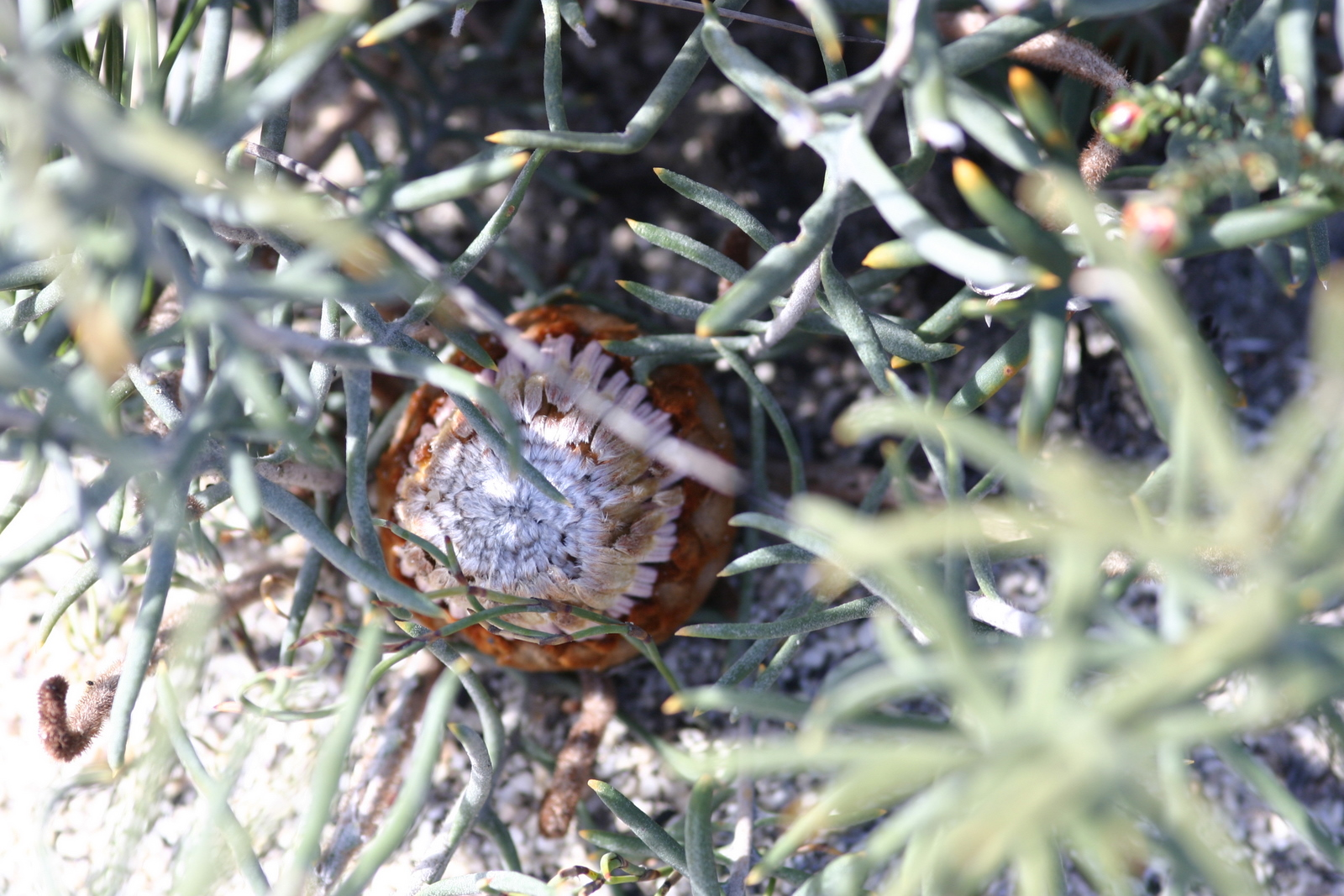
Dryandra pterifolia (now Banksia pteridifolia)

Dryandra (now Banksia ser. Dryandra)

D. sect. Eudryandra
D. sect. Aphragma

D. tenuifolia (now B. tenuis)
D. proteoides (now B. proteoides)

D. proteoides var. ferruginea (now B. rufa)

D. runcinata (now B. rufa subsp. rufa)
D. obtusa (now B. obtusa)
D. bipinnatifida (now B. bipinnatifida)
D. pteridifolia (now B. pteridifolia)
D. calophylla (now B. calophylla)

Bentham's arrangement would stand for well over a hundred years, with one minor exception. In 1903 Otto Kuntze challenged Dryandra R.Br. on the grounds that the name Josephia Knight had preceded it. In the process of transferring Dryandra into Josephia, Kuntze published the name Josephia sect. Aphragma (R.Br.) Kuntze. This was rejected, however, and J. sect. Aphragma is now considered a nomenclatural synonym of D. ser. Aphragma.

== According to George ==
In 1996, Alex George demoted D. sect. Aphragma to a series within D. subg. Dryandra. He did not accept the previous definitions of the series, but nonetheless accepted the basic circumscription as sound; he instead used a range of flower, seed and leaf characters. The placement and circumscription of D. ser. Aphragma in George's arrangement, as amended in 1999 and 2005, may be summarised as follows:

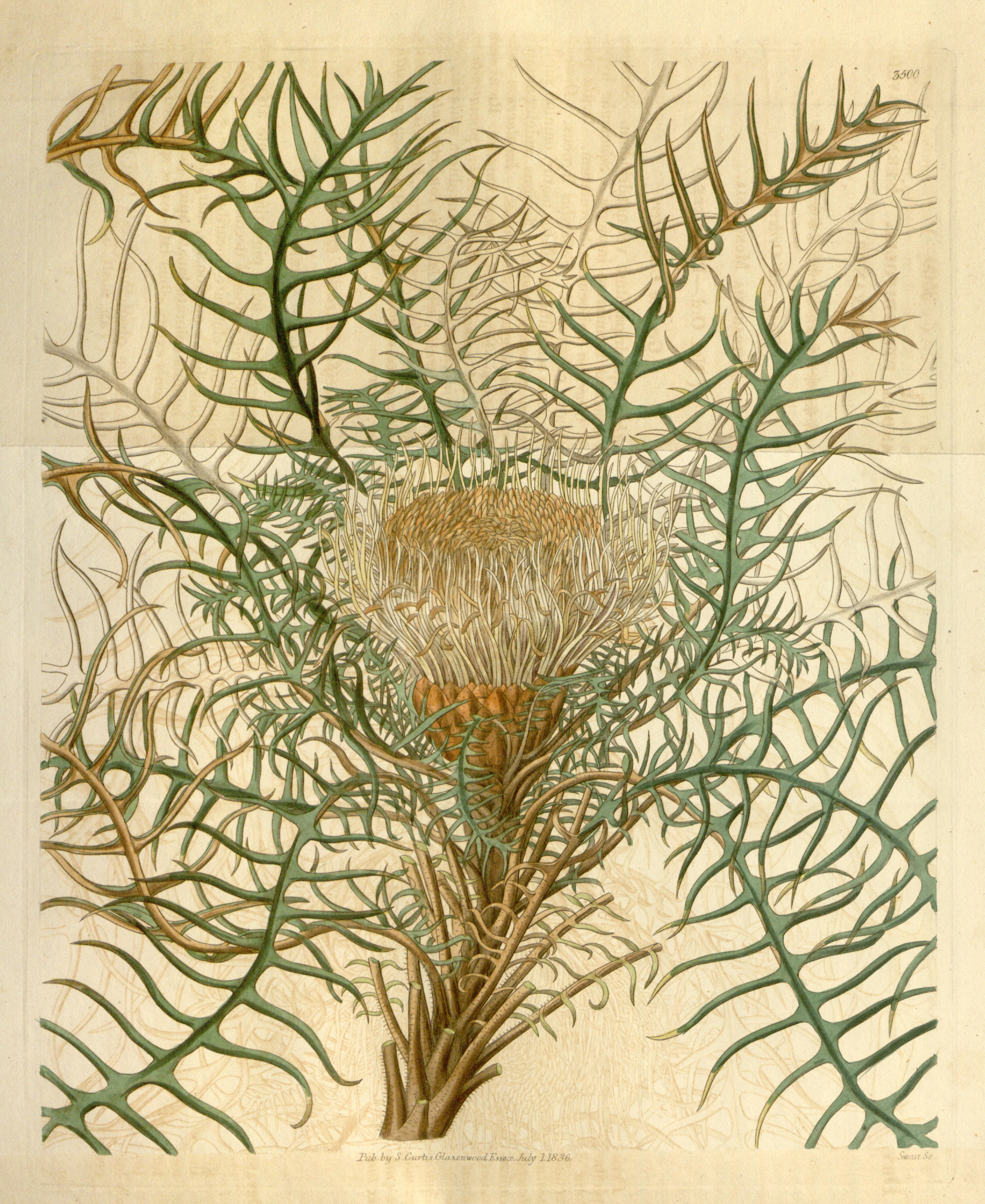
Dryandra pterifolia (now Banksia pteridifolia)

Dryandra (now Banksia ser. Dryandra)

D. subg. Dryandra

D. ser. Floribundae (1 species, 4 varieties)
D. ser. Armatae (21 species, 7 subspecies, 4 varieties)
D. ser. Marginatae (1 species)
D. ser. Folliculosae (1 species, 5 varieties)
D. ser. Acrodontae (4 species, 2 varieties)
D. ser. Capitellatae (2 species, 2 subspecies)
D. ser. Ilicinae (3 species, 2 varieties)
D. ser. Dryandra (3 species, 2 subspecies)
D. ser. Foliosae (3 species, 2 subspecies)
D. ser. Decurrentes (1 species)
D. ser. Tenuifoliae (2 species, 2 varieties)
D. ser. Runcinatae (4 species, 7 subspecies)
D. ser. Triangulares (3 species, 3 subspecies)
D. ser. Aphragma

D. pteridifolia (now B. pteridifolia)

D. pteridifolia subsp. inretita (now B. pteridifolia subsp. inretita)
D. pteridifolia subsp. pteridifolia (now B. pteridifolia subsp. pteridifolia)
D. pteridifolia subsp. vernalis (now B. pteridifolia subsp. vernalis)

D. fililoba (now B. fililoba)
D. shanklandiorum (now B. shanklandiorum)
D. nervosa (now B. alliacea)
D. blechnifolia (now B. pellaeifolia)
D. porrecta (now B. porrecta)
D. aurantia (now B. aurantia)
D. calophylla (now B. calophylla)
D. lepidorhiza (now B. lepidorhiza)

D. ser. Ionthocarpae (1 species, 2 subspecies)
D. ser. Inusitatae (1 species)
D. ser. Subulatae (1 species)
D. ser. Gymnocephalae (11 species, 4 subspecies, 2 varieties)
D. ser. Concinnae (3 species)
D. ser. Obvallatae (7 species, 2 varieties)
D. ser. Pectinatae (1 species)
D. ser. Acuminatae (1 species)
D. ser. Niveae (7 species, 7 subspecies)

D. subg. Hemiclidia (2 species)
D. subg. Diplophragma (1 species)

== Recent developments ==
Since 1998, Austin Mast has been publishing results of ongoing cladistic analyses of DNA sequence data for the subtribe Banksiinae. His analyses have provided compelling evidence of the paraphyly of Banksia with respect to Dryandra; that is, it seems that Dryandra arose from within the ranks of Banksia. Early in 2007, Mast and Kevin Thiele initiated a rearrangement of Banksia by sinking Dryandra into it as B. ser. Dryandra. This transfer necessitated the setting aside of George's infrageneric arrangement of Dryandra; thus D. ser. Aphragma is no longer current. Mast and Thiele have foreshadowed publishing a full arrangement once DNA sampling of Dryandra is complete.
