= Meissner's taxonomic arrangement of Dryandra =

Carl Meissner's taxonomic arrangement of Dryandra, now Banksia ser. Dryandra, was published in 1856 as part of his chapter on the Proteaceae in A. P. de Candolle's Prodromus systematis naturalis regni vegetabilis. It replaced the 1830 arrangement of Robert Brown, and remained current until superseded by the 1870 arrangement of George Bentham.

== Background ==
The dryandras are a group of proteaceous shrubs endemic to southwest Western Australia. For nearly two hundred years they were considered a separate genus, having been published at that rank in 1810 by Robert Brown. In 2007 it was transferred into the genus Banksia as B. ser. Dryandra. There are now just under 100 species, plus numerous subspecies and varieties.

The first infrageneric arrangement of Dryandra was Brown's 1810 arrangement, which listed 13 species, but did not attempt an infrageneric classification. Twenty years later, Brown published a revised arrangement which divided 23 recognised species in three subgenera, and also transferred one of his 1810 Dryandra species into a separate genus named Hemiclidia. This remained current until 1856, when Meissner's arrangement was published.

== Meissner's arrangement ==
Meissner's arrangement retained Brown's Dryandra and Hemiclidia, divided Dryandra into three sections, and divided the largest section, Eudryandra, into eight unranked groups signified by the symbol "§". 53 species and six varieties were recognised.

Meissner's taxonomic arrangement of Dryandra may be summarised as follows:

Genus Dryandra (now Banksia ser. Dryandra)

Section Eudryandra

§ Ilicinæ

D. praemorsa (now B. undata)

D. praemorsa var. elongata (now B. undata var. undata)

D. quercifolia (now B. heliantha)
D. cuneata (now B. obovata)
D. floribunda (now B. sessilis var. sessilis)

D. floribunda var. cordata (now B. sessilis var. cordata)

§ Runcinatæ

D. armata (now B. armata)
D. carduacea (now B. squarrosa subsp. squarrosa)
D. runcinata (now B. r. subsp. rufa)
D. nobilis (now B. nobilis)
D. plumosa (now B. plumosa)

§ Serratæ

D. stupposa (now B. stuposa)
D. serra (now B. serra)
D. mucronulata (now B. mucronulata)
D. foliolata (now B. foliolata)
D. mutica (now B. foliolata)
D. obtusa (now B. obtusa)
D. Baxteri (now B. biterax)
D. formosa (now B. formosa)
D. nivea (now B. nivea)

D. nivea var. venosa (now B. nivea)
D. nivea var. subevenia (now B. dallanneyi var. dallanneyi)

D. brownii (now B. brunnea)
D. lindleyana (now B. dallanneyi)

§ Marginatæ

D. stenoprion (now B. stenoprion)
D. elegans (now B. tenuis var. tenuis)
D. pulchella (now B. bella)
D. Kippistiana (now B. kippistiana)
D. Shuttleworthiana (now B. shuttleworthiana)
D. sclerophylla (now B. sclerophylla)
D. squarrosa (now B. squarrosa)

§ Pectinatæ

D. serratuloides (now B. serratuloides)
D. nana (now B. nana)
D. arctotidis (now B. arctotidis)
D. tortifolia (now B. tortifolia)
D. Fraseri (now B. fraseri)
D. cirsioides (now B. cirsioides)

§ Decurrentes

D. seneciifolia (now B. seneciifolia)
D. horrida (now B. horrida)
D. concinna (now B. concinna)
D. vestita (now B. vestita)
D. Hewardiana (now B. hewardiana)
D. longifolia (now B. prolata)
D. comosa (now B. comosa)
D. proteoides (now B. proteoides)
D. tenuifolia (now B. tenuis)
D. ferruginea (now B. rufa)
D. cryptocephala (now B. seneciifolia)

§ Acrodontæ

D. carlinoides (now B. carlinoides)
D. tridentata (now B. tridentata)

§ Haplophyllæ

D. speciosa (now B. splendida)

Section Diplophragma

D. bipinnatifida (now B. bipinnatifida)
D. Preissii (now B. acuminata)

Section Aphragma

D. pteridifolia (now B. pteridifolia)

D. pteridifolia var. blechnifolia (now B. pellaeifolia)

D. calophylla (now B. calophylla)

D. calophylla var. acaulis (now B. drummondii subsp. drummondii)

D. nervosa (now Banksia alliacea)
D. drummondii (now Banksia drummondii)

Genus Hemiclidia

H. Baxteri (now Banksia falcata)

== Legacy ==
Meissner's arrangement remained current until 1870, when it was superseded by George Bentham's arrangement as published in Volume V of Flora Australiensis. Bentham abandoned all of Meissner's infrageneric taxa except Brown's D. sect. Aphragma. In 1996, however, Alex George published a revised arrangement, resurrecting Brown's Diplophragma at subgenus rank, and also Meissner's series Marginatae, Acrodontae, Ilicinae, Decurrentes, Runcinatae and Pectinatae.

In 2007, Austin Mast and Kevin Thiele transferred Dryandra into Banksia, on the grounds that Banksia was paraphyletic with respect to Dryandra. Mast and Thiele were not yet ready to proffer an arrangement for the new circumscription of Banksia, so as an interim measure they transferred Dryandra at series rank, so as to minimise disruption to the nomenclature. Thus the infrageneric arrangement of Dryandra has been set aside, at least temporarily, and hence none of Meissner's infrageneric taxa are in current use.
