= Brown's taxonomic arrangement of Dryandra =

Arrangement of plant series native to Australia

Robert Brown's taxonomic arrangement of Dryandra was the first arrangement of what is now Banksia ser. Dryandra. His initial arrangement was published in 1810, and a further arrangement, including an infrageneric classification, followed in 1830. Aspects of Brown's arrangements can be recognised in the later arrangements of George Bentham and Alex George.

== Background ==
The dryandras are a group of proteaceous shrubs endemic to southwest Western Australia. For nearly two hundred years they were considered a separate genus, having been published at that rank in 1810 by Robert Brown. In 2007 they were transferred into the genus Banksia as B. ser. Dryandra. There are now nearly 100 species, plus numerous subspecies and varieties.

== Brown's 1810 arrangement ==
The genus Dryandra was first published by Brown in "On the natural order of plants called Proteaceae", which was read to the Linnean Society of London in 1809, and published the following year in Volume X of Transactions of the Linnean Society of London. Brown listed 13 species, but did not attempt an infrageneric classification of them. Later that year, he republished his descriptions of Dryandra in his Prodromus Florae Novae Hollandiae et Insulae Van Diemen.

Brown's 1810 arrangement was as follows:

Genus Dryandra (now B. ser. Dryandra)

D. floribunda (now B. sessilis)
D. cuneata (now B. obovata)
D. armata (now B. armata)
D. falcata (now B. falcata)
D. formosa (now B. formosa)
D. mucronulata (now B. mucronulata)
D. plumosa (now B. plumosa)
D. obtusa (now B. obtusa)
D. nivea (now B. nivea)
D. longifolia (now B. prolata)
D. tenuifolia (now B. tenuis)
D. pteridifolia (now B. pteridifolia)
D. blechnifolia (now B. pellaeifolia)

== Brown's 1830 arrangement ==
Twenty years later, Brown issued a supplement to his Prodromus, entitled Supplementum Primum Prodromi Florae Novae Hollandiae. He added a further 11 species to Dryandra, but transferred D. falcata into a new, monospecific genus as Hemiclidia Baxteri, on the grounds that its follicles always contained only a single seed. The remaining 23 Dryandra species were divided into three sections based on the number of seed separators in each follicle. He allowed for these groups to be given subgenus rather than sectional rank, but they are now treated as having been published as sections.

The first section was defined as containing those species with a single seed separator. This accounted for the majority of species, and was named Dryandra verae ("True Dryandra"). D. sect. Diplophragma, was a monotypic section containing D. bipinnatifida (now B. bipinnatifida), the follicles of which Brown thought contained two separators. Finally, D. sect. Aphragmia was defined as containing four species that Brown thought lacked a seed separator altogether.

Brown's 1830 arrangement may be summarised as follows:

Genus Dryandra

Dryandra verae

D. floribunda (now B. sessilis)
D. cuneata (now B. obovata)
D. armata (now B. armata)
D. Serra (now B. serra)
D. concinna (now B. concinna)
D. foliolata (now B. foliolata)
D. squarrosa (now B. squarrosa)
D. formosa (now B. formosa)
D. mucronulata (now B. mucronulata)
D. Baxteri (now B. biterax)
D. plumosa (now B. plumosa)
D. obtusa (now B. obtusa)
D. arctotidis (now B. arctotidis)
D. nivea (now B. nivea)
D. Fraseri (now B. fraseri)
D. longifolia (now B. prolata)
D. seneciifolia (now B. seneciifolia)
D. tenuifolia (now B. tenuis)

Section Diplophragma

D. bipinnatifida (now B. bipinnatifida)

Section Aphragma

D. nervosa (now B. alliacea)
D. callophylla (now B. calophylla)
D. pteridifolia (now B. pteridifolia)
D. blechnifolia (now B. pellaeifolia)

Genus Hemiclidia

H. Baxteri (now B. falcata)

== Legacy ==
Brown's arrangement remained current until 1856, when Carl Meissner published his arrangement. In the interim a number of new species were published, notably in John Lindley's 1839 A Sketch of the Vegetation of the Swan River Colony, and by Meissner in J. G. C. Lehmann's 1845 Plantae Preissianae. However, the only significant change to Brown's classification was Stephan Endlicher's 1847 publication of Eudryandra as a replacement name for Brown's Dryandra verae.

Meissner's 1856 arrangement maintained Brown's distinction between Dryandra and Hemiclidia, and his three Dryandra sections, but further divided Eudryandra into eight series. George Bentham abandoned Hemiclidia in his 1870 arrangement, placing D. falcata within D. ser. Armatae because:

as far as I can understand the characters given, the difference in the fruit upon which the genus Hemiclidia was founded is merely the result of the abortion of one ovule, which occurs occasionally or perhaps constantly in one or two other species of Dryandra.

He also discarded D. sect. Diplophragma, placing B. bipinnatifida in section Aphragma, on the grounds that:

in the few seeds that I have been able to examine, the separation of the integument from the nucleus when not consolidated with the corresponding integument of the other seed has not appeared to me to be at all constant.

Thus of Brown's names, only Aphragma was still accepted.

In 1996, Alex George published a new arrangement. He revived the names Hemiclidia and Diplophragma, but with somewhat different circumscriptions. Both were given subgeneric rank, and Eudryandra was replaced by the autonymic subgenus D. subg. Dryandra. Aphragma was retained, but demoted to series rank within subgenus Dryandra. This arrangement was current until early 2007, when Austin Mast and Kevin Thiele transferred the entire genus Dryandra into Banksia on the grounds that Banksia was paraphyletic with respect to Dryandra. As Mast and Thiele were not yet ready to propose an infrageneric classification for their new circumscription of Banksia, they transferred Dryandra into Banksia at series rank, so as to cause minimal disruption to the current arrangement of Banksia. Thus the rich infrageneric classification of Dryandra, including all of Brown's taxa, has been set aside, at least temporarily.

== See also ==
- Brown's taxonomic arrangement of Banksia
- Meissner's taxonomic arrangement of Banksia
- Meissner's taxonomic arrangement of Dryandra
- Bentham's taxonomic arrangement of Banksia
- Bentham's taxonomic arrangement of Dryandra
- George's taxonomic arrangement of Banksia
- George's taxonomic arrangement of Dryandra
- Thiele and Ladiges' taxonomic arrangement of Banksia
