= Bentham's taxonomic arrangement of Dryandra =

1870 arrangement of the Australian endemic plant series Dryandra in the genus Banksia

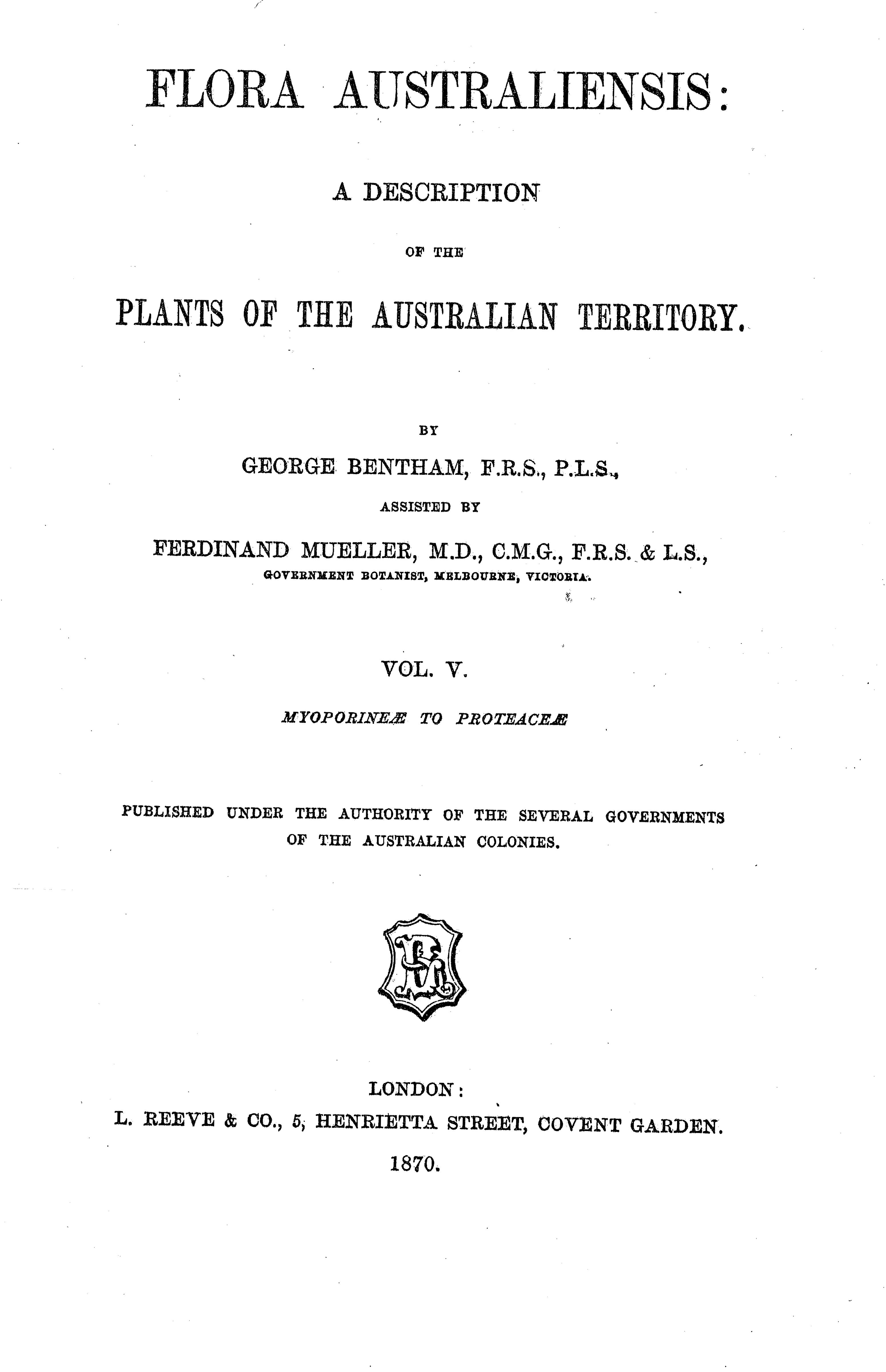
George Bentham's taxonomic arrangement of Dryandra was first published in Volume V of Flora Australiensis.

George Bentham's taxonomic arrangement of Dryandra (now B. ser. Dryandra) was published in 1870, in Volume 5 of Bentham's Flora Australiensis. It replaced the 1856 arrangement of Carl Meissner, and stood for over a century before being replaced by the 1996 arrangement of Alex George.

== Background ==
The dryandras are a group of proteaceous shrubs endemic to southwest Western Australia. For nearly two hundred years they were considered a separate genus, having been published at that rank in 1810 by Robert Brown. In 2007 it was transferred into the genus Banksia as B. ser. Dryandra. There are now just under 100 species, plus numerous subspecies and varieties.

The first infrageneric arrangement of Dryandra was Brown's 1810 arrangement, which listed 13 species, but did not attempt an infrageneric classification. Twenty years later, Brown published a revised arrangement which divided 23 recognised species in three subgenera, and placed one further species in a separate genus Hemiclidia. This was followed by the 1856 arrangement of Carl Meissner, which recognised 53 species and six varieties, dividing them into three sections and eight series, and maintaining the monospecific genus Hemiclidia.

== Bentham's arrangement ==
Bentham's arrangement was published in 1870, in Volume V of Flora Australiensis. He reduced the number of species to 47, and the number of varieties to two, proposing an arrangement consisting of two sections and seven series. Hemiclidia was transferred back into Dryandra.

George Bentham's 1870 taxonomic arrangement of Dryandra may be summarised as follows:

Genus Dryandra (now Banksia ser. Dryandra)

Section Eudryandra

Series Armatæ

D. quercifolia (now B. heliantha)
D. praemorsa (now B. undata)
D. cuneata (now B. obovata)
D. falcata (now B. falcata)
D. armata (now B. armata)
D. longifolia (now B. prolata)
D. Fraseri (now B. fraseri)

Series Floribundæ

D. floribunda (now B. sessilis var. sessilis)

D. floribunda var. major (now B. sessilis var. cordata)

D. carduacea (now B. squarrosa subsp. squarrosa)
D. carlinoides (now B. carlinoides)
D. polycephala (now B. polycephala)
D. Kippistiana (now B. kippistiana)

Series Concinnæ

D. squarrosa (now B. squarrosa)
D. serra (now B. serra)
D. concinna (now B. concinna)
D. foliolata (now B. foliolata)

Series Formosæ

D. stupposa (now B. stuposa)
D. nobilis (now B. nobilis)
D. mucronulata (now B. mucronulata)
D. formosa (now B. formosa)
D. Baxteri (now B. biterax)

Series Niveæ

D. nivea (now B. nivea)
D. arctotidis (now B. arctotidis)

D. arctotidis var. tortifolia (now B. tortifolia)

D. nana (now B. nana)
D. Preissii (now B. acuminata)

Series Obvallatæ

D. sclerophylla (now B. sclerophylla)
D. pulchella (now B. bella)
D. plumosa (now B. plumosa)
D. seneciifolia (now B. seneciifolia)
D. vestita (now B. vestita)
D. cirsioides (now B. cirsioides)
D. Hewardiana (now B. hewardiana)
D. patens (now B. hewardiana)
D. conferta (now B. densa)
D. horrida (now B. horrida)
D. serratuloides (now B. serratuloides)
D. comosa (now B. comosa)

Series Gymnocephalæ

D. Shuttleworthiana (now B. shuttleworthiana)
D. speciosa (now B. splendida)
D. tridentata (now B. tridentata)

Section Aphragma

D. tenuifolia (now B. tenuis)
D. proteoides (now B. proteoides)

D. proteoides var. ferruginea (now B. rufa

D. runcinata (now B. r. subsp. rufa)
D. obtusa (now B. obtusa)
D. bipinnatifida (now B. bipinnatifida)
D. pteridifolia (now B. pteridifolia)
D. calophylla (now B. calophylla)

== Legacy ==
Bentham's arrangement remained the accepted arrangement of Dryandra 126 years. It was finally replaced in 1996 by a new arrangement published by Alex George. George's arrangement retained a number of Bentham's infrageneric taxa.

In 2007, Austin Mast and Kevin Thiele transferred Dryandra into Banksia, on the grounds that Banksia was paraphyletic with respect to Dryandra. Mast and Thiele were not yet ready to proffer an arrangement for the new circumscription of Banksia, so as an interim measure they transferred Dryandra at series rank, so as to minimise disruption to the nomenclature. Thus the infrageneric arrangement of Dryandra has been set aside, at least temporarily, and hence none of Bentham's infrageneric taxa are in current use.
