= Dryandra subg. Diplophragma =

Obsolete subgenus of plants

Dryandra subg. Diplophragma is an obsolete subgenus within the former genus Dryandra (now Banksia ser. Dryandra). It was first published by Robert Brown in 1830, but was discarded by George Bentham in 1870. It was reinstated with a new circumscription by Alex George in 1996, but was ultimately discarded again in 2007 when Austin Mast and Kevin Thiele sank Dryandra into Banksia.

== According to Brown ==
Diplographma was first published by Brown in his 1830 Supplementum primum prodromi florae Novae Hollandiae. Brown's arrangement divided Dryandra into three groups according to what Brown perceived to be variations in the number of seed separators. He allowed for these groups to be treated at subgenus or section rank, but they are now treated as having been published as sections.

D. sect. Diplophragma was defined as containing a single species, D. bipinnatifida (now Banksia bipinnatifida), which Brown thought contained two seed separators. The epithet Diplophragma is from the Greek diplo ("two") and phragma ("barrier"). It is not clear how Brown came to believe that this species has two seed separators, as it actually has none.

The placement and circumscription of D. sect. Diplophragma in Brown's 1830 arrangement may be summarised as follows:

Dryandra (now B. ser. Dryandra)

Dryandra verae (18 species)
D. sect. Diplophragma

D. bipinnatifida (now B. bipinnatifida)

D. sect. Aphragma (4 species)

Hemiclidia (1 species)

== According to Meissner ==
In 1856, Carl Meissner published a revision of Dryandra. He retained all three of Brown's sections, but added bipinnatifid leaves (that is, leaves that are divided into lobes that are themselves divided) to the defining characters of D. sect. Diplophragma, and included in it the species D. preissii (now Banksia acuminata), which had been published in 1845. The placement and circumscription of D. sect. Diplophragma in Meissner's arrangement thus looks like this:

Dryandra (now Banksia ser. Dryandra)

D. sect. Eudryandra (8 series, 47 species, 7 varieties)
D. sect. Diplophragma

D. bipinnatifida (now B. bipinnatifida)
D. Preissii (now B. acuminata)

D. sect. Aphragma (4 species, 4 varieties)

Hemiclidia (1 species)

== According to Bentham ==
Along with many of Meissner's infrageneric taxa, which were overly reliant on leaf characters, Bentham discarded D. sect. Diplophragma in his 1870 arrangement. Despite having seen only a few seeds, he correctly observed that the characteristics of the fruit upon which Brown based the section were not constant:

"[I]n the few seeds that I have been able to examine, the separation of the integument from the nucleus when not consolidated with the corresponding integument of the other seed has not appeared to me to be at all constant. The whole question requires further investigation on the part of those who may have a sufficient supply of good fruits of the several species."

Bentham also recognised that the two species placed in D. sect. Diplophragma by Meissner are not closely related; he placed D. bipinnatifida in D. sect. Aphragma, and D. preissii in D. sect. Eudryandra ser. Niveae.

== According to George ==
When Alex George published his revision of Dryandra in 1996, he recognised that D. bipinatifida possessed a number of very distinctive characters, especially in its fruiting structure. These include unusually large follicles and seeds; seeds that are set within the seed wings rather than along the base or one side; and unusual double wings that are attached to each side of the seed. In addition, the species has extremely long involucral bracts, and floral bracts that enlarge more than any other species. Recognising the need for this species to be placed in its own subgenus, George resurrected Diplophragma, promoting it to subgenus rank as D. subg. Diplophragma.

The placement and circumscription of D. subg. Diplophragma in George's arrangement, as amended in 1999 and 2005, may be summarised as follows:

Dryandra (now Banksia ser. Dryandra)

D. ser. Dryandra (24 series, 91 species, 39 subspecies, 23 varieties)
D. ser. Hemiclidia (2 species)
D. subg. Diplophragma

D. bipinnatifida (now Banksia bipinnatifida)

== Recent developments ==
Since 1998, Austin Mast has been publishing results of ongoing cladistic analyses of DNA sequence data for the subtribe Banksiinae. His analyses have provided compelling evidence of the paraphyly of Banksia with respect to Dryandra; that is, it seems that Dryandra arose from within the ranks of Banksia. Early in 2007, Mast and Kevin Thiele initiated a rearrangement of Banksia by sinking Dryandra into it as B. ser. Dryandra. This transfer necessitated the setting aside of George's infrageneric arrangement of Dryandra; thus D. subg. Diplophragma is no longer current. Mast and Thiele have foreshadowed publishing a full arrangement once DNA sampling of Dryandra is complete.
