= Hibbertia atrichosepala =

Conservation status
- Priority One — Poorly Known Taxa (DEC)

Scientific classification
- Kingdom: Plantae
- Clade: Tracheophytes
- Clade: Angiosperms
- Clade: Eudicots
- Order: Dilleniales
- Family: Dilleniaceae
- Genus: Hibbertia
- Species: H. atrichosepala

Binomial name
- Hibbertia atrichosepala Wege & K.R.Thiele

Species of flowering plant

Hibbertia atrichosepala is a species of flowering plant in the family Dilleniaceae and is endemic to a restricted area in the south-west of Western Australia. It is an upright shrub with crowded linear to tapering leaves and yellow flowers arranged singly in leaf axils with glabrous sepals and the five stamens all on one side of the two carpels.

== Description ==
Hibbertia atrichosepala is an upright shrub that typically grows to a height of up to 1.2 m (3 ft 11 in), its young branchlets distinctly ribbed and densely covered with star-shaped hairs. The leaves are crowded and spirally arranged along the branchlets, linear to subulate, 7–13 mm (0.28–0.51 in) long and 0.8–1.4 mm (0.031–0.055 in) wide on a petiole 0.3–1 mm (0.012–0.039 in) long. The flowers are arranged singly in leaf axils on a peduncle 3.5–7 mm (0.14–0.28 in) long with a narrow triangular bract 1.5–2.5 mm (0.059–0.098 in) long. The five sepals are green, more or less tinged with red, glabrous, elliptic to egg-shaped, 4.5–6 mm (0.18–0.24 in) long, the outer sepals sharply pointed and the inner sepals rounded. The five petals are yellow, 8–10 mm (0.31–0.39 in) long and egg-shaped with the narrower end towards the base. The five stamens are all on one side of the two carpels and are joined at the base. The carpels are densely hairy and there are two ovules per carpel. Flowering has been recorded from September to November and in April.

== Taxonomy ==
Hibbertia atrichosepala was first formally described in 2009 by Juliet Wege and Kevin Thiele in the journal Nuytsia from specimens collected on the Ravensthorpe Range in 2008. The specific epithet (atrichosepala) means "hairless sepals".

== Distribution and habitat ==
This species is only known from rocky hill slopes near Ravensthorpe in the south-west of Western Australia.

== Conservation status ==
Hibbertia atrichosepala is classified as "Priority One" by the Government of Western Australia Department of Parks and Wildlife, meaning that it is known from only one or a few locations where it is potentially at risk.

== See also ==
- List of Hibbertia species
