= Banksia splendida subsp. macrocarpa =

Scientific classification
- Kingdom: Plantae
- Clade: Tracheophytes
- Clade: Angiosperms
- Clade: Eudicots
- Order: Proteales
- Family: Proteaceae
- Genus: Banksia
- Species: B. splendida
- Subspecies: B. s. subsp. macrocarpa

Trinomial name
- Banksia splendida subsp. macrocarpa (A.S.George) A.R.Mast & K.R.Thiele

Synonyms
- Dryandra speciosa subsp. macrocarpa A.S.George

Subspecies of shrub

Banksia splendida subsp. macrocarpa is a subspecies of Banksia splendida. It was known as Dryandra speciosa subsp. macrocarpa until 2007, when Austin Mast and Kevin Thiele transferred all Dryandra species into Banksia. Since a species named Banksia speciosa already existed, Mast and Thiele had to choose a new specific epithet for D. speciosa and its subspecies. Like other members of Banksia ser. Dryandra, it is endemic to the South West Botanical Province of Western Australia.
