= Banksia splendida subsp. splendida =

Scientific classification
- Kingdom: Plantae
- Clade: Tracheophytes
- Clade: Angiosperms
- Clade: Eudicots
- Order: Proteales
- Family: Proteaceae
- Genus: Banksia
- Species: B. splendida A.R.Mast & K.R.Thiele
- Subspecies: B. s. subsp. splendida

Trinomial name
- Banksia splendida subsp. splendida

Synonyms
- Dryandra speciosa subsp. speciosa

Subspecies of shrub

Banksia splendida subsp. splendida is a shrub that is a subspecies of Banksia splendida. It was known as Dryandra speciosa subsp. speciosa until 2007, when Austin Mast and Kevin Thiele sunk all Dryandra into Banksia. Since the name Banksia speciosa had already been used, Mast and Thiele had to choose a new specific epithet for D. speciosa and hence for this subspecies of it. As with other members of Banksia ser. Dryandra, it is endemic to the South West Botanical Province of Western Australia. As an autonym, it is defined as encompassing the type material of the species.
