= Hibbertia depilipes =

Scientific classification
- Kingdom: Plantae
- Clade: Tracheophytes
- Clade: Angiosperms
- Clade: Eudicots
- Order: Dilleniales
- Family: Dilleniaceae
- Genus: Hibbertia
- Species: H. depilipes

Binomial name
- Hibbertia depilipes K.R.Thiele

Species of flowering plant

Hibbertia depilipes is a species of flowering plant in the family Dilleniaceae and is endemic to the far south-west of Western Australia. It is usually a sprawling shrub with scattered linear leaves and yellow flowers arranged singly in leaf axils usually with ten stamens all on one side of the two carpels.

== Description ==
Hibbertia depilipes is usually a sprawling shrub that typically grows to a height of 20–40 cm (7.9–15.7 in), sometimes forming adventitious roots from prostrate branches. The leaves are linear and scattered, mostly 5–10 mm (0.20–0.39 in) long and 0.7–1.0 mm (0.028–0.039 in) wide on a petiole 0.2–0.6 mm (0.0079–0.0236 in) long. The flowers are arranged singly in upper leaf axils on pedicels 15–25 mm (0.59–0.98 in) long with narrow triangular bracts 1–2.5 mm (0.039–0.098 in) long. The five sepals are egg-shaped, 3.5–6 mm (0.14–0.24 in) long. The five petals are yellow, broadly egg-shaped 4.5–7 mm (0.18–0.28 in) long and there are ten stamens are all on one side of the two carpels with two or three staminodes either side of the stamens. The carpels are densely hairy and there are two ovules per carpel. Flowering has been recorded from mid-October to mid-December.

== Taxonomy ==
Hibbertia depilipes was first formally described in 2017 by Kevin Thiele in the journal Nuytsia from specimens he collected in Orchard Valley in 2013. The specific epithet (depilipes) means "hairless foot" referring to the glabrous petioles.

== Distribution and habitat ==
This species grows in open woodland and forest, usually in moist situations and occurs mostly west of the Albany Highway but inland from the coast in the Avon Wheatbelt, Jarrah Forest and Mallee biogeographic regions in the far south-west of Western Australia.

== Conservation status ==
Hibbertia depilipes is classified as "not threatened" by the Government of Western Australia Department of Parks and Wildlife.

== See also ==
- List of Hibbertia species
