= Banksia tenuis var. reptans =

Scientific classification
- Kingdom: Plantae
- Clade: Tracheophytes
- Clade: Angiosperms
- Clade: Eudicots
- Order: Proteales
- Family: Proteaceae
- Genus: Banksia
- Species: B. tenuis
- Variety: B. t. var. reptans

Trinomial name
- Banksia tenuis var. reptans (A.S.George) A.R.Mast & K.R.Thiele

Synonyms
- Dryandra tenuifolia var. reptans A.S.George

Variety of shrub

Banksia tenuis var. reptans is a variety of Banksia tenuis. It was known as Dryandra tenuifolia var. reptans until 2007, when Austin Mast and Kevin Thiele sunk all Dryandra into Banksia. Since the name Banksia tenuifolia had already been used, Mast and Thiele had to choose a new specific epithet for D. tenuifolia and hence for this variety of it. As with other members of Banksia ser. Dryandra, it is endemic to the South West Botanical Province of Western Australia.
