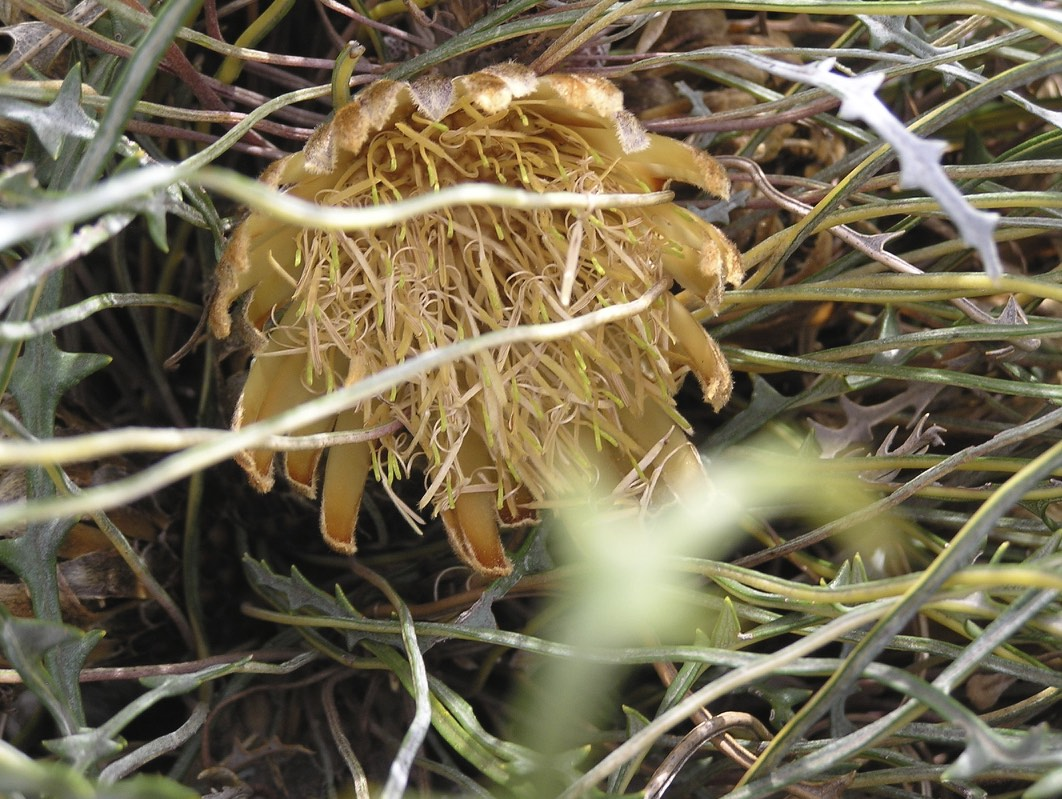
- Near Lake Grace

Conservation status
- Priority Three — Poorly Known Taxa (DEC)

Scientific classification
- Kingdom: Plantae
- Clade: Tracheophytes
- Clade: Angiosperms
- Clade: Eudicots
- Order: Proteales
- Family: Proteaceae
- Genus: Banksia
- Subgenus: Banksia subg. Banksia
- Series: Banksia ser. Dryandra
- Species: B. corvijuga

Binomial name
- Banksia corvijuga (A.S.George) A.R.Mast & K.R.Thiele

Synonyms
- Dryandra corvijuga A.S.George

= Banksia corvijuga =

Species of shrub endemic to Western Australia

Banksia corvijuga is a species of densely-foliaged shrub that is endemic to Western Australia. It has broadly linear, serrated leaves, heads of about sixty yellow flowers and glabrous follicles.

== Description ==
Banksia corvijuga is a densely-foliaged shrub that typically grows to a height of 1.3 m (4 ft 3 in) but does not form a lignotuber. It has serrated, broadly linear leaves that are 100–200 mm (3.9–7.9 in) long and 5–14 mm (0.20–0.55 in) wide on a thin petiole 20–60 mm (0.79–2.36 in) long, with between ten and twenty-five triangular teeth on each side. The flowers are borne on a head containing about sixty flowers with broadly linear to egg-shaped, dark reddish brown involucral bracts 40–50 mm (1.6–2.0 in) long at the base of the head. The flowers are yellow with a perianth 38–41 mm (1.5–1.6 in) long and a pistil 44–46 mm (1.7–1.8 in) long. Flowering occurs from September to October and the fruit is a glabrous, elliptical to egg-shaped follicle about 15 mm (0.59 in) long.

== Taxonomy and naming ==
This banksia was first formally described in 1996 by Alex George in the journal Nuytsia and given the name Dryandra corvijuga from specimens collected in 1986 near Ravensthorpe. In 2007, Austin Mast and Kevin Thiele transferred all the dryandras to the genus Banksia and this species became Banksia corvijuga. The specific epithet (corvijuga) is derived from Latin words meaning "a crow or raven" and "paired or yoked together", referring to the Ravensthorpe Range.

== Distribution and habitat ==
Banksia corvijuga grows in dense shrubland in the Ravensthorpe Range.

== Conservation status ==
This banksia is classified as "Priority Three" by the Government of Western Australia Department of Parks and Wildlife meaning that it is poorly known and known from only a few locations but is not under imminent threat.
