= Banksia pteridifolia subsp. pteridifolia =

Scientific classification
- Kingdom: Plantae
- Clade: Tracheophytes
- Clade: Angiosperms
- Clade: Eudicots
- Order: Proteales
- Family: Proteaceae
- Genus: Banksia
- Species: B. pteridifolia (R.Br.) A.R.Mast & K.R.Thiele
- Subspecies: B. p. subsp. pteridifolia

Trinomial name
- Banksia pteridifolia subsp. pteridifolia

Synonyms
- Dryandra pteridifolia R.Br. subsp. pteridifolia

Subspecies of shrub

Banksia pteridifolia subsp. pteridifolia is a subspecies of Banksia pteridifolia. As an autonym, it is defined as encompassing the type material of the species. It was known as Dryandra pteridifolia subsp. pteridifolia until 2007, when Austin Mast and Kevin Thiele sunk all Dryandra into Banksia. As with other members of Banksia ser. Dryandra, it is endemic to the South West Botanical Province of Western Australia.
