= Banksia fasciculata =

Conservation status
- Priority Three — Poorly Known Taxa (DEC)

Scientific classification
- Kingdom: Plantae
- Clade: Tracheophytes
- Clade: Angiosperms
- Clade: Eudicots
- Order: Proteales
- Family: Proteaceae
- Genus: Banksia
- Subgenus: Banksia subg. Banksia
- Series: Banksia ser. Dryandra
- Species: B. fasciculata

Binomial name
- Banksia fasciculata (A.S.George) A.R.Mast & K.R.Thiele

Synonyms
- Dryandra fasciculata A.S.George

Species of shrub endemic to Western Australia

Banksia fasciculata is a species of column-shaped shrub that is endemic to Western Australia. It has hairy stems, crowded, prickly leaves, yellow flowers and hairy fruit.

== Description ==
Banksia fasciculata is a column-shaped shrub that typically grows to a height of 1.5–2.5 m (4 ft 11 in – 8 ft 2 in) but does not form a lignotuber. It has hairy stems and serrated leaves that are linear in outline, 60–180 mm (2.4–7.1 in) long and 7–10 mm (0.28–0.39 in) wide on a petiole 10–40 mm (0.39–1.57 in) long, with between five and fifteen sharply-pointed teeth on each side. The flowers are borne on a head containing between forty and sixty flowers in each head. There are many narrow involucral bracts 25–33 mm (0.98–1.30 in) long, covered with silky, rusty brown hairs at the base of the head. The flowers have a creamy yellow perianth 18–22 mm (0.71–0.87 in) long and a yellow pistil 23–31 mm (0.91–1.22 in) long. Flowering occurs from late May to August and the follicles are egg-shaped, 6–9 mm (0.24–0.35 in) long and hairy.

== Taxonomy and naming ==
This banksia was first formally described in 1996 by Alex George in the journal Nuytsia from specimens he collected near Harrismith, and given the name Dryandra fasciculata. In 2007, Austin Mast and Kevin Thiele transferred all the dryandras to the genus Banksia and this species became Banksia fasciculata. The specific epithet (fasciculata) is a Latin word meaning "clustered" or "in bundles" referring to the crowded leaves and flowering heads.

== Distribution and habitat ==
Banksia fasciculata grows in mallee-kwongan between Corrigin and Kukerin in the Avon Wheatbelt and Mallee biogeographic regions.

== Conservation status ==
This banksia is classified as "Priority Three" by the Government of Western Australia Department of Parks and Wildlife meaning that it is poorly known and known from only a few locations but is not under imminent threat.
