= Banksia trifontinalis =

Conservation status
- Priority Three — Poorly Known Taxa (DEC)

Scientific classification
- Kingdom: Plantae
- Clade: Tracheophytes
- Clade: Angiosperms
- Clade: Eudicots
- Order: Proteales
- Family: Proteaceae
- Genus: Banksia
- Subgenus: Banksia subg. Banksia
- Series: Banksia ser. Dryandra
- Species: B. trifontinalis

Binomial name
- Banksia trifontinalis (A.S.George) A.R.Mast and K.R.Thiele

Synonyms
- Dryandra trifontinalis A.S.George

Species of shrub endemic to Western Australia

Banksia trifontinalis is a species of openly-branched shrub that is endemic to the southwest of Western Australia. It has broadly linear, coarsely serrated, sharply pointed leaves, pale yellow flowers in heads of about sixty, and oblong to egg-shaped follicles.

== Description ==
Banksia trifontinalis is an openly branched shrub that typically grows to a height of 2 m (6 ft 7 in) but does not form a lignotuber. It broadly linear, coarsely serrated leaves that are 30–160 mm (1.2–6.3 in) long and 10–18 mm (0.39–0.71 in) wide and sessile or on a petiole up to 10 mm (0.39 in) long. There are between five and ten sharply-pointed triangular teeth on each side of the leaves. The flowers are pale yellow and arranged in heads of between fifty-five and sixty-five with egg-shaped to lance-shaped involucral bracts up to 10 mm (0.39 in) long at the base of the head. The perianth is 24–25 mm (0.94–0.98 in) long and the pistil 25–26 mm (0.98–1.02 in) long and more or less straight. Flowering occurs from August to September and the fruit is a sparsely hairy, oblong to egg-shaped follicle 6–9 mm (0.24–0.35 in) long.

== Taxonomy ==
The type specimen was collected west of Three Springs, Western Australia by Alex George on 6 August 1986. George published a description of the species in 1996 in the journal Nuytsia, naming it Dryandra trifontinalis. The specific epithet is from the Latin tri- ("three") and fontinalis ("of a spring"), in reference to the town of Three Springs.

In 2007, all Dryandra species were transferred to Banksia by Austin Mast and Kevin Thiele and this species was given the name Banksia trifontinalis.

== Distribution and habitat ==
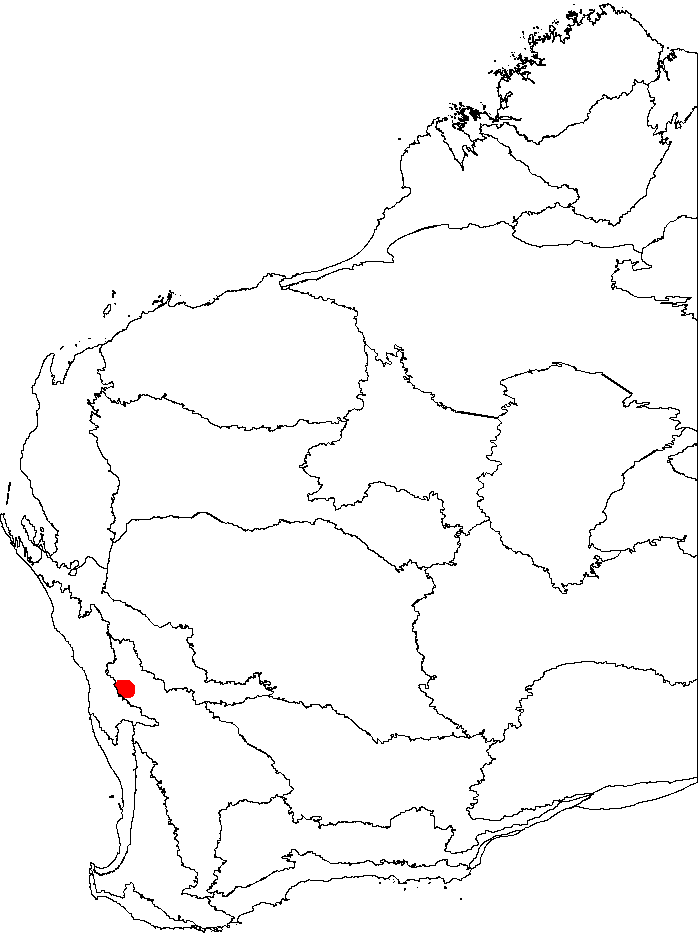
Distribution of B. trifontinalis, shown on a map of Western Australia's biogeographic regions

Banksia trifontinalis occurs only in a few populations in the vicinity of Arrino and Three Springs in the Geraldton Sandplains biogeographic region. It is locally common, and grows on lateritic soil in low woodland.

== Conservation status ==
This banksia is classified as "Priority Three" by the Government of Western Australia Department of Parks and Wildlife meaning that it is poorly known and known from only a few locations but is not under imminent threat.
