= Banksia insulanemorecincta =

Conservation status
- Priority Four — Rare Taxa (DEC)

Scientific classification
- Kingdom: Plantae
- Clade: Tracheophytes
- Clade: Angiosperms
- Clade: Eudicots
- Order: Proteales
- Family: Proteaceae
- Genus: Banksia
- Subgenus: Banksia subg. Banksia
- Series: Banksia ser. Dryandra
- Species: B. insulanemorecincta

Binomial name
- Banksia insulanemorecincta (A.S.George) A.R.Mast & K.R.Thiele

Synonyms
- Dryandra insulanemorecincta A.S.George

Species of shrub endemic to Western Australia

Banksia insulanemorecincta is a species of shrub that is endemic to a small region in the south-west of Western Australia. It is a bushy shrub with serrated, lance-shaped leaves with the narrower end towards the base, heads of about fifty cream-coloured and dull brown flowers and hairy, elliptical follicles.

== Description ==
Banksia insulanemorecincta is a bushy shrub that typically grows to a height of 1 m (3 ft 3 in) but does not form a lignotuber. It has lance-shaped leaves that are narrower towards the base, 100–200 mm (3.9–7.9 in) long and 10–24 mm (0.39–0.94 in) wide on a petiole up to 10 mm (0.39 in) long. There are between eight and eleven teeth up to 6 mm (0.24 in) long on each side of the leaves. Between forty and fifty flowers are arranged in each head with linear to tapering involucral bracts up to 15 mm (0.59 in) long at the base of the head. The flowers are cream-coloured and dull brown with a perianth 16–19 mm (0.63–0.75 in) long and a down-curved pistil 19–24 mm (0.75–0.94 in) long. Flowering occurs from June to September and the follicles that form later are elliptical, 10–13 mm (0.39–0.51 in) long.

== Taxonomy and naming ==
This banksia was discovered by Abe van de Sande, a West Australian government field officer. It was first formally described in 1999 by Alex George in Flora of Australia Volume 17B and given the name Dryandra insulanemorecincta from specimens he collected near Brookton in 1998. The specific epithet (insulanemorecincta, pronounced 'in-soo-la-ne-mor-ay-sink-ta') is from the Latin words insula meaning "an island", nemus "a wood or forest" and cinctus "to girdle" referring to the unusual habitat of this species.

== Distribution and habitat ==
Banksia insulanemorecincta is known from several population on the Darling Plateau near Brookton where it grows in islands of low heath, surrounded by jarrah forest.

== Conservation status ==
This banksia is classified as "Priority Four" by the Government of Western Australia Department of Parks and Wildlife, meaning that is rare or near threatened.
