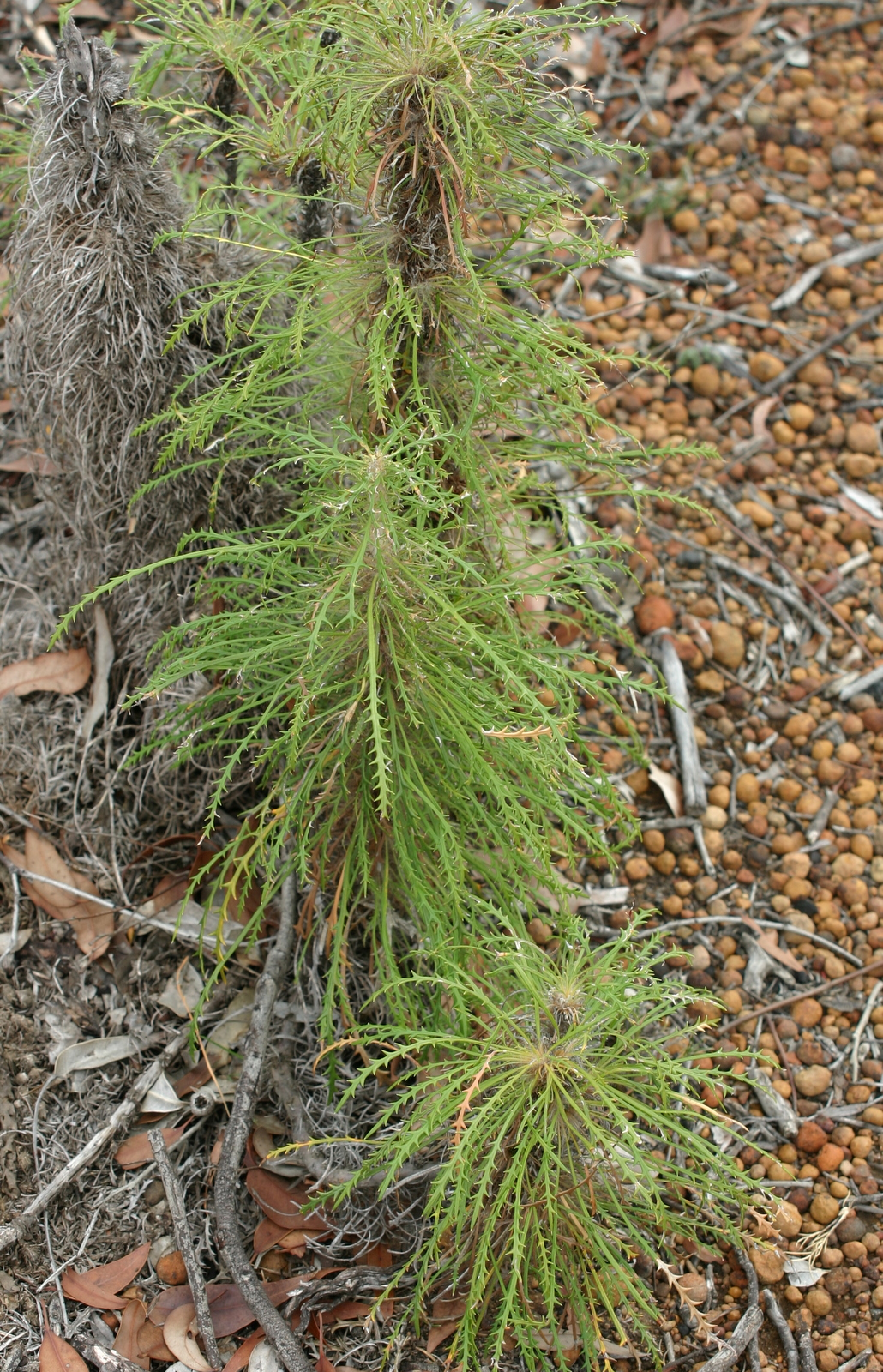
- Banksia columnaris at Dryandra Woodland, Western Australia

Scientific classification
- Kingdom: Plantae
- Clade: Tracheophytes
- Clade: Angiosperms
- Clade: Eudicots
- Order: Proteales
- Family: Proteaceae
- Genus: Banksia
- Subgenus: Banksia subg. Banksia
- Series: Banksia ser. Dryandra
- Species: B. columnaris

Binomial name
- Banksia columnaris (A.S.George) A.R.Mast & K.R.Thiele

Synonyms
- Dryandra columnaris A.S.George; Dryandra seneciifolia auct. non R.Br.:Sainsbury, R.M. (1985)

= Banksia columnaris =

Species of shrub in Western Australia

Banksia columnaris is a species of column-like shrub that is endemic to Western Australia. It has pinnatifid leaves with between five and eighteen lobes on each side, heads of pale yellow to purple flowers and usually only one or two follicles forming in each head.

== Description ==
Banksia columnaris is a shrub that typically grows to a height of 2 m (6 ft 7 in) but does not form a lignotuber. The leaves are linear in shape and pinnatifid, 50–150 mm (2.0–5.9 in) long and 3–15 mm (0.12–0.59 in) wide on a woolly, hairy petiole up to 40 mm (1.6 in) long. Each side of the leaves has between five and eighteen curved, triangular lobes up to 8 mm (0.31 in) long. The flowers are borne on a sessile head surrounded by leaves and with tapering hairy, linear involucral bracts up to 20 mm (0.79 in) long at the base of the head. There are between 25 and 35 flowers in each head, each flower with a curved, pale yellow to purple perianth 11–14 mm (0.43–0.55 in) long and a reddish brown pistil 13–20 mm (0.51–0.79 in) long. Flowering occurs from May to June and one or two broadly egg-shaped or wedge-shaped follicles 10–12 mm (0.39–0.47 in) long form in each head.

== Taxonomy and naming ==
This banksia was first formally described in 1996 by Alex George in the journal Nuytsia and given the name Dryandra columnaris from specimens he collected in 1969 in the Boyagin Nature Reserve near Brookton. In 2007, Austin Mast and Kevin Thiele transferred all the dryandras to the genus Banksia and this species became Banksia columnaris. The specific epithet (columnaris) is a Latin word meaning "column-like", referring to the habit of this species.

== Distribution and habitat ==
Banksia columnaris grows in low woodland and kwongan in a few areas between Brookton and Narrogin in the Avon Wheatbelt and Jarrah Forest biogeographic regions.
