= Banksia pallida =

Scientific classification
- Kingdom: Plantae
- Clade: Tracheophytes
- Clade: Angiosperms
- Clade: Eudicots
- Order: Proteales
- Family: Proteaceae
- Genus: Banksia
- Subgenus: Banksia subg. Banksia
- Series: Banksia ser. Dryandra
- Species: B. pallida

Binomial name
- Banksia pallida (A.S.George) A.R.Mast & K.R.Thiele

Synonyms
- Dryandra pallida A.S.George

Species of shrub endemic to Western Australia

Banksia pallida is a species of column-shaped shrub that is endemic to the south-west of Western Australia. It has densely hairy stems, linear leaves with three to five serrations on each side, pale yellow flowers in heads of up to eighty and egg-shaped to elliptical follicles.

== Description ==
Banksia pallida is a column-shaped shrub that typically grows to a height of 2 m (6 ft 7 in) and has densely hairy stems but does not form a lignotuber. The leaves are broadly linear, mostly 50–80 mm (2.0–3.1 in) long and 20–30 mm (0.79–1.18 in) wide on a petiole 5–10 mm (0.20–0.39 in) long, with between three and five triangular lobes up to 15 mm (0.59 in) long on each side. The flowers are pale yellow and arranged in heads of between sixty-five and eighty with narrow lance-shaped involucral bracts 10–12 mm (0.39–0.47 in) long at the base of the head. The perianth is 25–27 mm (0.98–1.06 in) long and the pistil 29–31 mm (1.1–1.2 in) long and strongly curved. Flowering occurs from May to June and the follicles are egg-shaped to elliptical and 8–10 mm (0.31–0.39 in) long.

== Taxonomy and naming ==
This species was first formally described in 1996 by Alex George who gave it the name Dryandra pallida and published the description in the journal Nuytsia from specimens he collected near Pingaring in 1969. The specific epithet (pallida) is from the Latin word pallidus meaning "pale", referring to the colour of the flowers.

In 2007, Austin Mast and Kevin Thiele transferred all the dryandras to the genus Banksia and this species became Banksia pallida.

== Distribution and habitat ==
Banksia pallida grows in kwongan and is found between Nyabing, Frank Hann National Park, Kulin and Holt Rock in the Esperance Plains and Mallee biogeographic regions.

== Conservation status ==
This banksia is classed as "not threatened" by the Western Australian Government Department of Parks and Wildlife.
