= Banksia epimicta =

Conservation status
- Priority Two — Poorly Known Taxa (DEC)

Scientific classification
- Kingdom: Plantae
- Clade: Tracheophytes
- Clade: Angiosperms
- Clade: Eudicots
- Order: Proteales
- Family: Proteaceae
- Genus: Banksia
- Subgenus: Banksia subg. Banksia
- Series: Banksia ser. Dryandra
- Species: B. epimicta

Binomial name
- Banksia epimicta (A.S.George) A.R.Mast & K.R.Thiele

Synonyms
- Dryandra epimicta A.S.George

Species of shrub endemic to Western Australia

Banksia epimicta is a species of prostrate shrub that is endemic to a small area in the south-west of Western Australia. It has crowded, sharply pointed pinnatifid leaves, large heads of unpleasantly scented, creamy white and pale yellow flowers and a small number of follicles.

== Description ==
Banksia epimicta is a prostrate, spreading shrub with its stems more or less on the ground and that forms a lignotuber. It has crowded, pinnatifid leaves that are linear in outline, 110–330 mm (4.3–13.0 in) long and 7–14 mm (0.28–0.55 in) wide on a petiole up to 30 mm (1.2 in) long, with between ten and thirty-five sharply-pointed, curved teeth on each side. The flowers are borne on a down-turned head containing between forty-five and seventy pungent-smelling flowers in each head. There are broadly linear to egg-shaped, dull brown involucral bracts 40–50 mm (1.6–2.0 in) long at the base of the head. The flowers have a creamy white and pale yellow perianth 43–52 mm (1.7–2.0 in) long and a curved, cream-coloured pistil 45–58 mm (1.8–2.3 in) long. Flowering occurs from July to September and there are several more or less glabrous follicles 18–19 mm (0.71–0.75 in) long in each head.

== Taxonomy and naming ==
This banksia was first formally described in 1996 by Alex George in the journal Nuytsia and given the name Dryandra epimicta from specimens collected in 1986 near Kulin. In 2007, Austin Mast and Kevin Thiele transferred all the dryandras to the genus Banksia and this species became Banksia epimicta. The specific epithet (epimicta) is derived from the ancient Greek word mykter, meaning "a nose" or "a nostril" with the prefix epi- meaning "upon", referring to the strong, unpleasant smell of the flowers.

== Distribution and habitat ==
Banksia epimicta grows in kwongan and shrubland in a small area near Kulin where only about one hundred plants were known in 1990.

== Conservation status ==
This banksia is classified as "Priority Two" by the Western Australian Government Department of Parks and Wildlife meaning that it is poorly known and from only one or a few locations.
