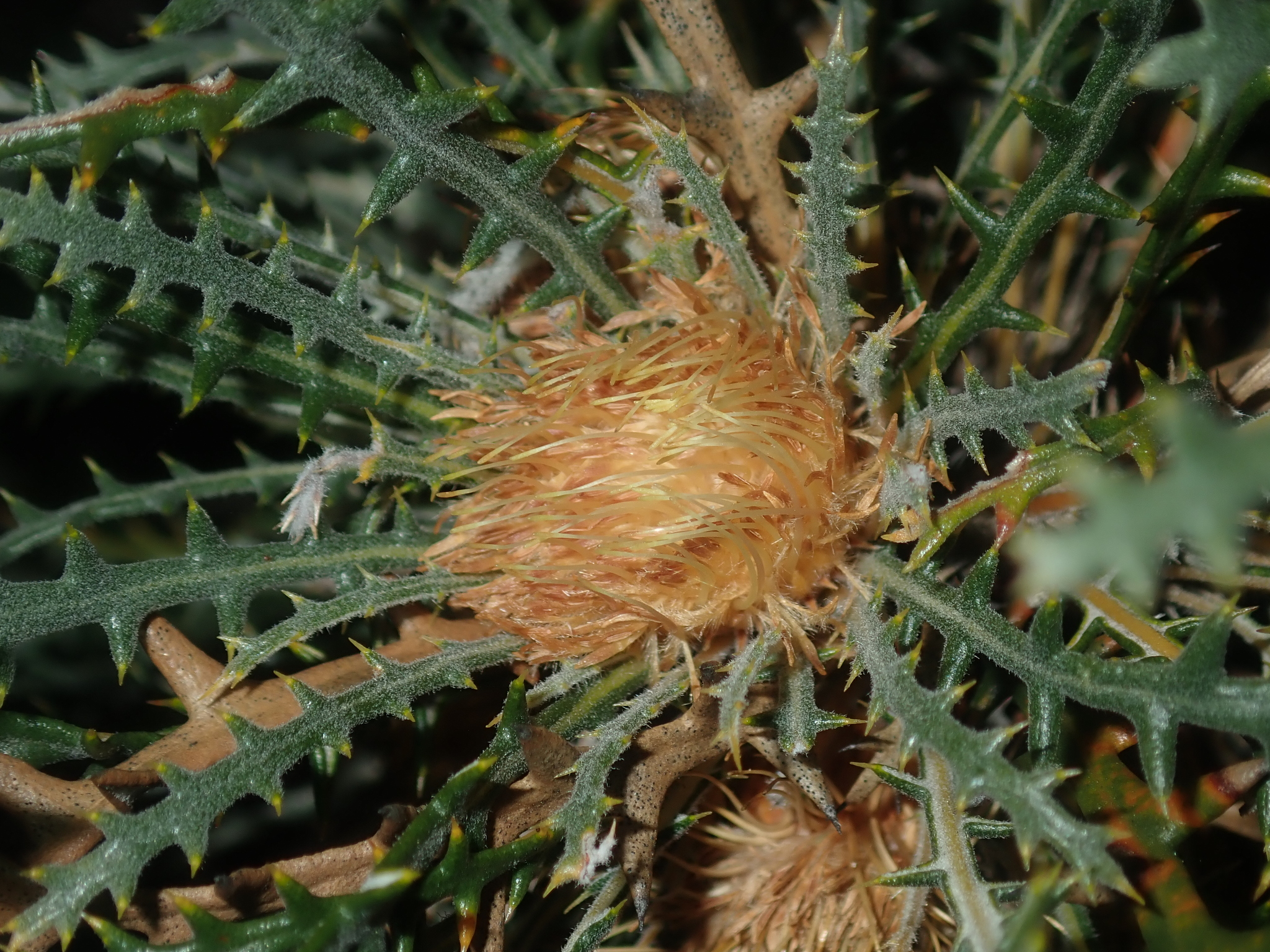

Scientific classification
- Kingdom: Plantae
- Clade: Tracheophytes
- Clade: Angiosperms
- Clade: Eudicots
- Order: Proteales
- Family: Proteaceae
- Genus: Banksia
- Subgenus: Banksia subg. Banksia
- Series: Banksia ser. Dryandra
- Species: B. platycarpa

Binomial name
- Banksia platycarpa (A.S.George) A.R.Mast & K.R.Thiele

Synonyms
- Dryandra platycarpa A.S.George

= Banksia platycarpa =

Species of shrub endemic to Western Australia

Banksia platycarpa is a species of small shrub that is endemic to the south-west of Western Australia. It has broadly linear pinnatipartite leaves, with up to twenty-five sharply pointed lobes on each side, creamy-yellow to orange flowers in heads of up to seventy-five, and egg-shaped follicles.

== Description ==
Banksia platycarpa is a shrub with column-like branches that typically grows to a height of 80 cm (31 in), has hairy stems and does not form a lignotuber. Its leaves are broadly linear and pinnatipartite, 40–120 mm (1.6–4.7 in) long and 6–15 mm (0.24–0.59 in) wide with between ten and twenty-five sharply-pointed, linear to narrow triangular lobes up to 8 mm (0.31 in) long on each side. The flowers are creamy-yellow to orange and arranged in heads of between sixty and seventy-five with many linear involucral bracts about 12 mm (0.47 in) long at the base of the head. The perianth is 13–16 mm (0.51–0.63 in) long and the pistil 16–19 mm (0.63–0.75 in) long and downturned. Flowering occurs from May to August and the follicles are egg-shaped, 9 mm (0.35 in) long and 11–13 mm (0.43–0.51 in) wide.

== Taxonomy and naming ==
This species was first formally described in 1996 by Alex George who gave it the name Dryandra platycarpa and published the description in the journal Nuytsia from specimens he collected in the Alexander Morrison National Park in 1986. The specific epithet (platycarpa) is from Greek words meaning "wide" and "fruit", referring to the follicles.

In 2007, Austin Mast and Kevin Thiele transferred all the dryandras to the genus Banksia and this species became Banksia platycarpa.

== Distribution and habitat ==
Banksia platycarpa grows in kwongan between Eneabba and Mogumber.

== Conservation status ==
This Banksia is classified as "not threatened" by the Western Australian Government Department of Parks and Wildlife.
