= Banksia glaucifolia =

Scientific classification
- Kingdom: Plantae
- Clade: Tracheophytes
- Clade: Angiosperms
- Clade: Eudicots
- Order: Proteales
- Family: Proteaceae
- Genus: Banksia
- Subgenus: Banksia subg. Banksia
- Series: Banksia ser. Dryandra
- Species: B. glaucifolia

Binomial name
- Banksia glaucifolia A.R.Mast & K.R.Thiele

Synonyms
- Dryandra glauca A.S.George

Species of shrub endemic to Western Australia

Banksia glaucifolia is a species of shrub that is endemic to Western Australia. It has deeply serrated, wedge-shaped leaves with sharply pointed lobes, pale yellow flowers and follicles with hairy edges.

== Description ==
Banksia glaucofolia is a shrub that typically grows to a height of 1.5 m (4 ft 11 in) and has hairy stems but does not form a lignotuber. Its leaves are wedge-shaped in outline, deeply serrated, 45–75 mm (1.8–3.0 in) long and 20–35 mm (0.79–1.38 in) wide on a flat, hairy petiole 5–10 mm (0.20–0.39 in) long. The leaves are more or less glaucous and have between six and thirteen narrow triangular, sharply pointed lobes on each side. The flowers are borne on a head containing between 80 and 110 flowers in each head. There are broadly linear involucral bracts 12–18 mm (0.47–0.71 in) long at the base of the head. The flowers have a pale yellow perianth 28–34 mm (1.1–1.3 in) long and a cream-coloured pistil 30–35 mm (1.2–1.4 in) long. Flowering occurs from July to October and the follicles are egg-shaped, about 7 mm (0.28 in) long and hairy along the edges.

== Taxonomy and naming ==
This banksia was first formally described in 1996 by Alex George who gave it the name Dryandra glauca and published the description in the journal Nuytsia from specimens collected in Watheroo National Park in 1986. In 2007, Austin Mast and Kevin Thiele transferred all the Dryandra species to Banksia but as the name Banksia glauca had already been used for a synonym of Banksia integrifolia subsp. integrifolia, Mast and Thiele changed the epithet to glaucifolia. The epithet retains the original use of "glauca", from the Latin glaucus meaning "blue-grey", with the Latin folium for "leaf", referring to the blue-grey leaves of the species.

== Distribution and habitat ==
Banksia glaucifolia grows in kwongan on rises from near Eneabba and Tathra National Park to Badgingarra in the Geraldton Sandplains and Swan Coastal Plain biogeographic regions.

== Conservation status ==
This banksia is classified as "not threatened" by the Western Australian Government Department of Parks and Wildlife.
