= Banksia tenuis var. tenuis =

Scientific classification
- Kingdom: Plantae
- Clade: Tracheophytes
- Clade: Angiosperms
- Clade: Eudicots
- Order: Proteales
- Family: Proteaceae
- Genus: Banksia
- Species: B. tenuis A.R.Mast & K.R.Thiele
- Variety: B. t. var. tenuis

Trinomial name
- Banksia tenuis var. tenuis

Synonyms
- Dryandra tenuifolia var. tenuifolia

Variety of shrub

Banksia tenuis var. tenuis is a variety of Banksia tenuis. It was known as Dryandra tenuifolia var. tenuifolia until 2007, when Austin Mast and Kevin Thiele sunk all Dryandra into Banksia. Since the name Banksia tenuifolia had already been used, Mast and Thiele had to choose a new specific epithet for D. tenuifolia and hence for this variety of it. As with other members of Banksia ser. Dryandra, it is endemic to the South West Botanical Province of Western Australia. As an autonym, it is defined as encompassing the type material of the species.
