= Banksia rufistylis =

Conservation status
- Priority Two — Poorly Known Taxa (DEC)

Scientific classification
- Kingdom: Plantae
- Clade: Tracheophytes
- Clade: Angiosperms
- Clade: Eudicots
- Order: Proteales
- Family: Proteaceae
- Genus: Banksia
- Subgenus: Banksia subg. Banksia
- Series: Banksia ser. Dryandra
- Species: B. rufistylis

Binomial name
- Banksia rufistylis (A.S.George) A.R.Mast & K.R.Thiele

Synonyms
- Dryandra rufistylis A.S.George

Species of shrub endemic to Western Australia

Banksia rufistylis is a species of column-shaped shrub that is endemic to Western Australia. It has linear leaves with sharply-pointed serrations, cream-coloured flowers with a red style arranged in heads of about forty, and egg-shaped follicles with a flattened tip.

== Description ==
Banksia rufistylis is a column-shaped shrub that typically grows to a height of 1.5 m (4 ft 11 in) but does not form a lignotuber. Its leaves are linear, 40–100 mm (1.6–3.9 in) long and 4–10 mm (0.16–0.39 in) wide on a hairy petiole up to 15 mm (0.59 in) long. There are between five and ten sharply pointed serrations up to 5 mm (0.20 in) long on each side of the leaves. The flowers are arranged in sessile heads of between thirty-five and forty. The flowers are creamy-yellow or yellow with the perianth 14–18 mm (0.55–0.71 in) long, and the pistil 18–22 mm (0.71–0.87 in) long, red and downcurved. Flowering occurs from July to August and the fruit is a sparsely hairy follicle 7–9 mm (0.28–0.35 in) long with a flattened tip.

== Taxonomy and naming ==
This species was first formally described in 1996 by Alex George who gave it the name Dryandra rufistylis and published the description in the journal Nuytsia from material he collected near Woodanilling. In 2007 Austin Mast and Kevin Thiele transferred all dryandras to the genus Banksia and renamed this species Banksia rufistylis.

== Distribution and habitat ==
Banksia rufistylis grows in kwongan and woodland between the Woodanilling, Nyabing and Tarin Rock districts.

== Conservation status ==
This banksia is classified as "Priority Two" by the Western Australian Government Department of Parks and Wildlife meaning that it is poorly known and from only one or a few locations.
