= Banksia cypholoba =

Conservation status
- Priority Three — Poorly Known Taxa (DEC)

Scientific classification
- Kingdom: Plantae
- Clade: Tracheophytes
- Clade: Angiosperms
- Clade: Eudicots
- Order: Proteales
- Family: Proteaceae
- Genus: Banksia
- Subgenus: Banksia subg. Banksia
- Series: Banksia ser. Dryandra
- Species: B. cypholoba

Binomial name
- Banksia cypholoba (A.S.George) A.R.Mast & K.R.Thiele

Synonyms
- Dryandra cypholoba A.S.George

Species of shrub endemic to Western Australia

Banksia cypholoba is a species of dwarf, prostrate shrub that is endemic to Western Australia. It has pinnatipartite leaves with twenty-five to forty triangular lobes on each side, heads of about sixty brownish and yellow flowers and mostly glabrous follicles.

== Description ==
Banksia cypholoba is a prostrate shrub that typically grows to a height of 0.3 m (1 ft 0 in) and has short, underground, fire-tolerant stems. It has pinnatipartite leaves that are 120–200 mm (4.7–7.9 in) long and 8–20 mm (0.31–0.79 in) wide on a hairy petiole 10–40 mm (0.39–1.57 in) long, with between twenty-five and forty triangular lobes on each side. The flowers are borne on a head containing between fifty and sixty flowers. There are narrow lance-shaped to egg-shaped, green and brownish involucral bracts 20–28 mm (0.79–1.10 in) long covered with rusty brown hairs, at the base of the head. The flowers have a pale pinkish brown perianth 27–37 mm (1.1–1.5 in) long and a lemon-yellow pistil 41–47 mm (1.6–1.9 in) long. Flowering occurs in August and the fruit is a mostly glabrous egg-shaped follicle 13–16 mm (0.51–0.63 in) long.

== Taxonomy and naming ==
This banksia was first formally described in 1996 by Alex George in the journal Nuytsia and given the name Dryandra cypholoba from specimens he collected in 1986 near Warradarge. In 2007, Austin Mast and Kevin Thiele transferred all the dryandras to the genus Banksia and this species became Banksia cypholoba. The specific epithet (cypholoba) is derived from Greek words meaning "bent" or "humped" and "a lobe", referring to the lobes of the leaves.

== Distribution and habitat ==
Banksia cypholoba grows in kwongan or in thick scrub between Arrino and the Alexander Morrison National Park in the Geraldton Sandplains biogeographic region.

== Conservation status ==
This banksia is classified as "Priority Three" by the Government of Western Australia Department of Parks and Wildlife meaning that it is poorly known and known from only a few locations but is not under imminent threat.
