= Banksia squarrosa subsp. squarrosa =

Scientific classification
- Kingdom: Plantae
- Clade: Tracheophytes
- Clade: Angiosperms
- Clade: Eudicots
- Order: Proteales
- Family: Proteaceae
- Genus: Banksia
- Species: B. squarrosa (R.Br.) A.R.Mast & K.R.Thiele
- Subspecies: B. s. subsp. squarrosa

Trinomial name
- Banksia squarrosa subsp. squarrosa

Synonyms
- Dryandra squarrosa R.Br. subsp. squarrosa

Subspecies of shrub

Banksia squarrosa subsp. squarrosa is a subspecies of Banksia squarrosa, commonly called "pingle". As an autonym, it is defined as encompassing the type material of the species. It was known as Dryandra squarrosa subsp. squarrosa until 2007, when Austin Mast and Kevin Thiele sunk all Dryandra into Banksia. As with other members of Banksia ser. Dryandra, it is endemic to the South West Botanical Province of Western Australia.
