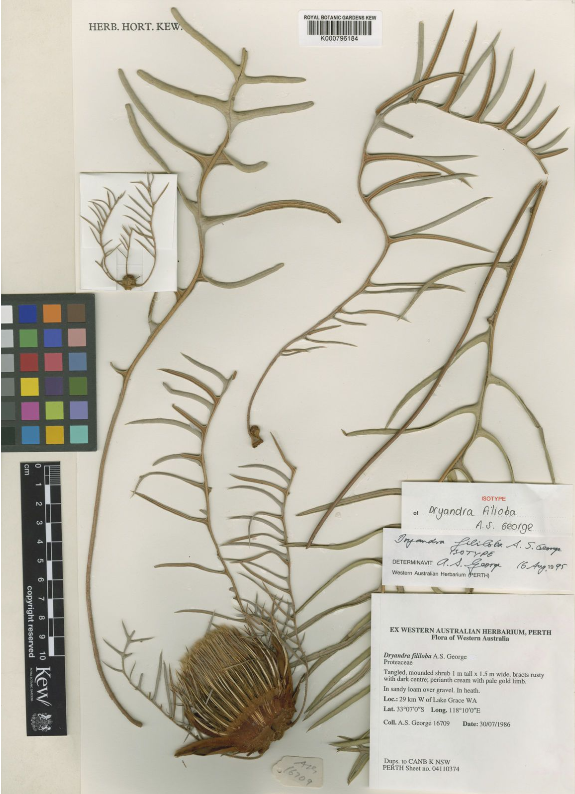

Scientific classification
- Kingdom: Plantae
- Clade: Tracheophytes
- Clade: Angiosperms
- Clade: Eudicots
- Order: Proteales
- Family: Proteaceae
- Genus: Banksia
- Subgenus: Banksia subg. Banksia
- Series: Banksia ser. Dryandra
- Species: B. fililoba

Binomial name
- Banksia fililoba (A.S.George) A.R.Mast & K.R.Thiele

Synonyms
- Dryandra fililoba A.S.George

= Banksia fililoba =

Species of shrub endemic to Australia

Banksia fililoba is a species of shrub that is endemic to Western Australia. It has pinnatipartite leaves with sharply pointed lobes, heads of up to eighty yellowish flowers and egg-shaped fruit. It mainly grows in kwongan in the south-west of the state.

== Description ==
Banksia fililoba is a tangled shrub that typically grows to a height of 1 m (3 ft 3 in) but does not form a lignotuber. It has hairy stems and deeply pinnatipartite leaves that are 150–300 mm (5.9–11.8 in) long and 7–14 mm (0.28–0.55 in) wide on a petiole 50–150 mm (2.0–5.9 in) long. There are between ten and seventeen sharply-pointed, linear leaves 50–150 mm (2.0–5.9 in) long on each side of the leaves. The flowers are borne on a head containing between fifty-five and eighty flowers in each head. There are egg-shaped to oblong involucral bracts 25–42 mm (0.98–1.65 in) long, densely covered with silky, rusty brown hairs at the base of the head. The flowers have a pale yellow perianth 50–53 mm (2.0–2.1 in) long and a cream-coloured pistil 49–52 mm (1.9–2.0 in) long. Flowering mainly occurs from May to July and the follicles are egg-shaped, about 17 mm (0.67 in) long and hairy at first.

== Taxonomy and naming ==
This banksia was first formally described in 1996 by Alex George in the journal Nuytsia from specimens he collected near Lake Grace, and given the name Dryandra fililoba. In 2007, Austin Mast and Kevin Thiele transferred all the dryandras to the genus Banksia and this species became Banksia fililoba. The specific epithet (fililoba) is from Latin words meaning "a thread" and "a lobe" referring to the fine lobes of the leaves.

== Distribution and habitat ==
Banksia fililoba grows in kwongan, sometimes in wandoo woodland, between Woodanilling, Lake Grace and Harrismith in the Avon Wheatbelt and Mallee biogeographic regions.

== Conservation status ==
This banksia is classified as "not threatened" by the Western Australian Government Department of Parks and Wildlife.
