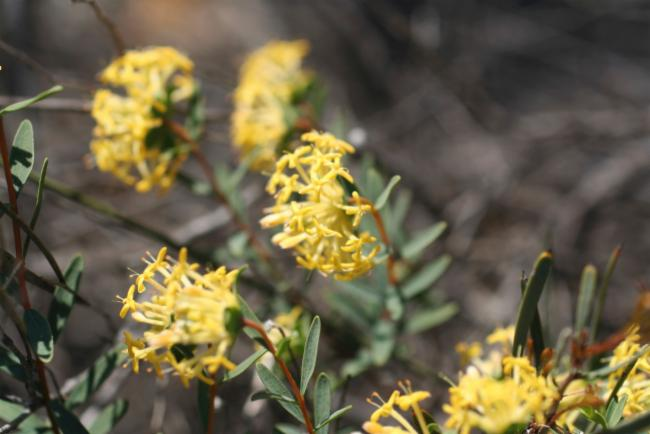
- Pimelea angustifolia in Kalbarri National Park

Scientific classification
- Kingdom: Plantae
- Clade: Tracheophytes
- Clade: Angiosperms
- Clade: Eudicots
- Clade: Rosids
- Order: Malvales
- Family: Thymelaeaceae
- Genus: Pimelea
- Species: P. angustifolia

Binomial name
- Pimelea angustifolia R.Br.

Synonyms
- Synonyms: Banksia angustifolia (R.Br.) Kuntze; Banksia nervosa (Meisn.) Kuntze; Calyptrostegia angustifolia (R.Br.) C.A.Mey.; Calyptrostegia nervosa (Meisn.) Walp.; Pimelea angustifolia R.Br. var. angustifolia; Pimelea angustifolia var. calvescens Meisn.; Pimelea angustifolia var. drummondi Meisn.; Pimelea angustifolia var. major Meisn.; Pimelea angustifolia var. minor Meisn.; Pimelea nervosa Meisn.; Pimelea tenuis M.B.Scott; Pimelea tenuis var. longistyla M.B.Scott; Pimelea tenuis M.B.Scott var. tenuis

= Pimelea angustifolia =

Narrow-leaved pimelea

Species of shrub

Pimelea angustifolia, commonly known as narrow-leaved pimelea, is a small upright, slender or open shrub with whitish, cream, yellow or pink flowers. It is endemic to Western Australia.

== Description ==
Pimelea angustifolia is a small shrub 0.1–1 m (4 in – 3 ft 3 in) high with smooth stems. The leaves are arranged in opposite pairs on a short petiole, mostly linear or narrowly elliptic, smooth, mid-green throughout, 2–30 mm (0.08–1.18 in) long and 1–5 mm (0.04–0.20 in) wide.

== Taxonomy and naming ==
Pimelea angustifolia was first formally described in 1810 by Robert Brown in his book Prodromus Florae Novae Hollandiae et Insulae Van Diemen. The specific epithet (angustifolia) is from the Latin angustus meaning "narrow" and -folius meaning "-leaved".

== Distribution and habitat ==
Narrow-leaved pimelea is a widespread species, it grows from Kalbarri, in coastal areas to the South Australian border and inland north of Kalgoorlie mostly on sand, sandy clay, lateritic rock locations in sand dunes, plains, ridges and occasionally in wetter sites.

== Conservation status ==
It is not considered to be threatened at this time.
