= Banksia lepidorhiza =

Conservation status
- Priority One — Poorly Known Taxa (DEC)

Scientific classification
- Kingdom: Plantae
- Clade: Tracheophytes
- Clade: Angiosperms
- Clade: Eudicots
- Order: Proteales
- Family: Proteaceae
- Genus: Banksia
- Subgenus: Banksia subg. Banksia
- Series: Banksia ser. Dryandra
- Species: B. lepidorhiza

Binomial name
- Banksia lepidorhiza (A.S.George) A.R.Mast & K.R.Thiele

Synonyms
- Dryandra lepidorhiza A.S.George

Species of shrub in Western Australia

Banksia lepidorhiza is a species of prostrate shrub that is endemic to Western Australia. It has underground stems, linear pinnatipartite leaves with sharply pointed lobes, pink, cream-coloured and yellow flowers in head of about thirty and egg-shaped follicles. It is only known from near Woodanilling.

== Description ==
Banksia lepidorhiza is a prostrate shrub that typically grows to a width of 1.5 m (4 ft 11 in) with underground stems and a lignotuber. It has dull green, pinnatipartite leaves with between fifteen and twenty-five linear, sharply pointed lobes on each side. The flowers are arranged in heads of between twenty-five and thirty with narrow lance-shaped, involucral bracts 9–10 mm (0.35–0.39 in) long at the base of the head. The flowers have a deep pink perianth 32–34 mm (1.3–1.3 in) long and a cream-coloured and dull yellow pistil 31–33 mm (1.2–1.3 in) long. Flowering occurs from October to November and the follicles are broadly egg-shaped, 10–15 mm (0.39–0.59 in) long and glabrous.

== Taxonomy and naming ==
This species was first formally described in 1996 by Alex George who gave it the name Dryandra lepidorhiza and published the description in the journal Nuytsia from a specimen he collected west of Woodanilling in 1986. The specific epithet (lepidorhiza) is from the ancient Greek words lepis (λεπίς), meaning 'scale', and rhiza (ῥίζα), meaning 'root', referring to the underground stems that are covered with scale-like bracts.

In 2007 Austin Mast and Kevin Thiele transferred all dryandras to the genus Banksia and renamed this species Banksia lepidorhiza.

== Distribution and habitat ==
Banksia lepidorhiza is only known from the type location where it grows in low kwongan in the Avon Wheatbelt biogeographic region.

== Conservation status ==
This banksia is classified as "Priority One" by the Government of Western Australia Department of Parks and Wildlife, meaning that it is known from only one or a few locations which are potentially at risk.
