= Banksia shanklandiorum =

Conservation status
- Priority Four — Rare Taxa (DEC)

Scientific classification
- Kingdom: Plantae
- Clade: Tracheophytes
- Clade: Angiosperms
- Clade: Eudicots
- Order: Proteales
- Family: Proteaceae
- Genus: Banksia
- Subgenus: Banksia subg. Banksia
- Series: Banksia ser. Dryandra
- Species: B. shanklandiorum

Binomial name
- Banksia shanklandiorum (Randall) A.R.Mast & K.R.Thiele

Synonyms
- Dryandra shanklandiorum Randall

Species of shrub endemic to Western Australia

Banksia shanklandiorum is a species of dense shrub that is endemic to the south-west of Western Australia. It has hairy stems, pinnatipartite to pinnatisect leaves with sharply-pointed lobes, pink to gold-coloured flowers in heads of about 100, and egg-shaped follicles.

== Description ==
Banksia shanklandiorum is a species of dense shrub with hairy stems and pinnatipartite to pinnatisect leaves that are 60–460 mm (2.4–18.1 in) long and mostly 20–140 mm (0.79–5.51 in) wide with between nine and sixteen sharply-pointed, linear lobes on each side. The flowers are pink to gold-coloured and arranged in heads of about 100 with rusty-hairy, lance-shaped involucral bracts 45–55 mm (1.8–2.2 in) long at the base of each head. The perianth is 48–58 mm (1.9–2.3 in) long and the pistil 58–74 mm (2.3–2.9 in) long. Flowering occurs from July to August and the follicles are egg-shaped, 12–15 mm (0.47–0.59 in) long and hairy in the lower half.

== Taxonomy ==
This species was first formally described in 1988 by Roderick Peter Randall who gave it the name Dryandra shanklandiorum and published the description in Botanische Jahrbücher für Systematik, Pflanzengeschichte und Pflanzengeographie from specimens he collected near Dowerin in 1985.

In 2007 Austin Mast and Kevin Thiele transferred all dryandras to the genus Banksia and renamed this species Banksia shanklandiorum.

== Distribution and habitat ==
Banksia shanklandiorum grows in tall shrubland between Cadoux and Hyden in the Avon Wheatbelt biogeographic region.

== Conservation status ==
This banksia is classified as "Priority Four" by the Government of Western Australia Department of Parks and Wildlife, meaning that is rare or near threatened.
