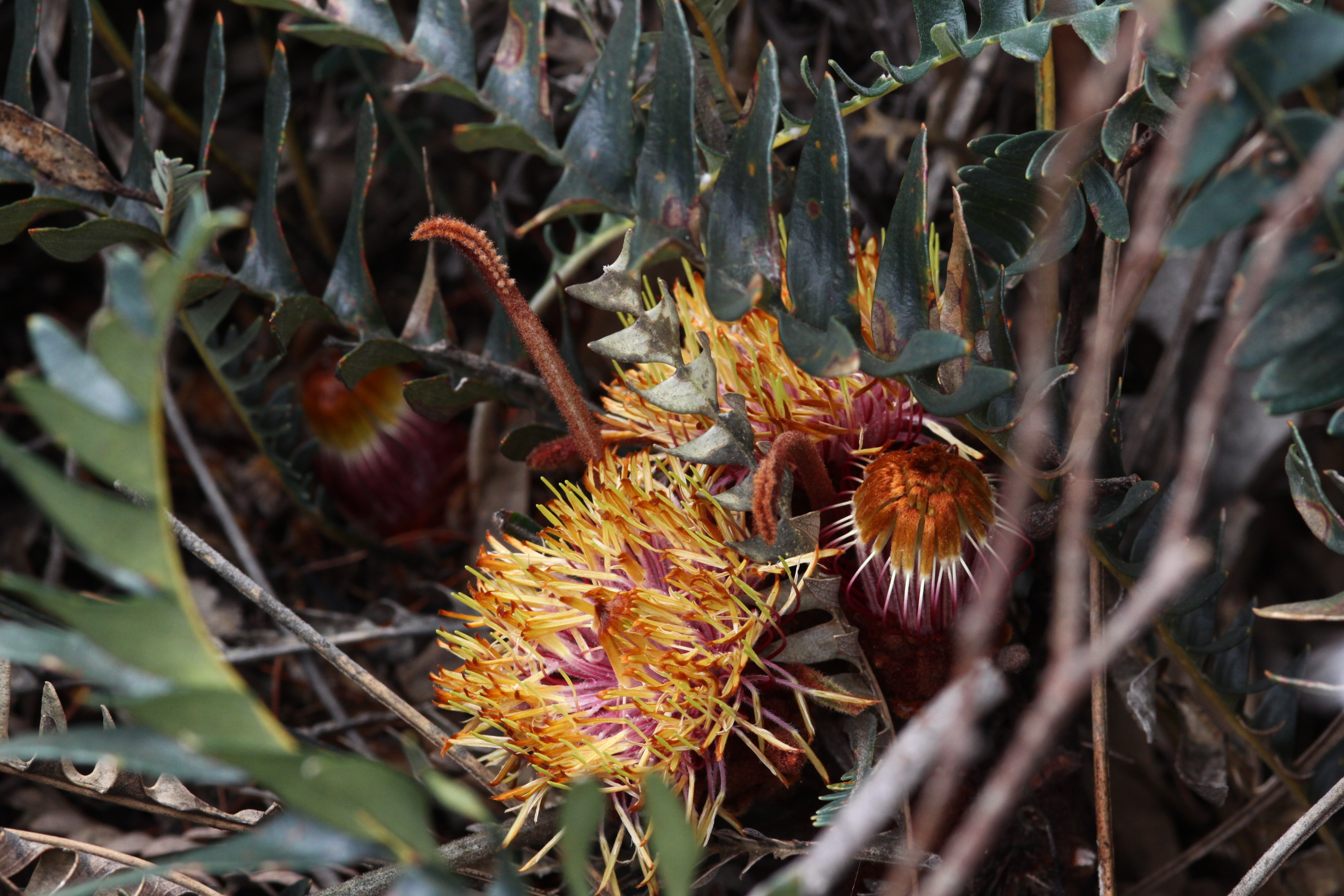
- Banksia drummondii subsp. drummondii

Scientific classification
- Kingdom: Plantae
- Clade: Tracheophytes
- Clade: Angiosperms
- Clade: Eudicots
- Order: Proteales
- Family: Proteaceae
- Genus: Banksia
- Subgenus: Banksia subg. Banksia
- Series: Banksia ser. Dryandra
- Species: B. drummondii

Binomial name
- Banksia drummondii (Meisn.) A.R.Mast & K.R.Thiele

Synonyms
- Dryandra drummondii Meisn.

= Banksia drummondii =

Drummond's dryandra

Species of shrub native to Western Australia

Banksia drummondii, commonly known as Drummond's dryandra, is a species of shrub that is endemic to Western Australia. It has pinnatifid to pinnatisect leaves, heads of up to one hundred cream-coloured, red and yellow flowers and glabrous fruit.

== Description ==
Banksia drummondii is a shrub that typically grows to a height of 1.5 m (4 ft 11 in) but does not form a lignotuber. The stems are erect and the leaves pinnatifid to pinnatisect, 150–900 mm (5.9–35.4 in) long and 2.5–7.5 mm (0.098–0.295 in) wide on a petiole 50–150 mm (2.0–5.9 in) long. The leaves are covered with rust-coloured, woolly hairs at first and have between 10 and 22 triangular to oblong lobes on each side. The upper side is bluish green and the veins on the lower side are prominent. The flowers are arranged in groups of 60 to 100 on the ends of branches, the heads with rusty-hairy involucral bracts up to 15 mm (0.59 in) long at the base. The flowers have a pale yellow perianth 37–56 mm (1.5–2.2 in) long and a thick cream-coloured or red pistil 43–69 mm (1.7–2.7 in) long. Flowering occurs from May to June or from November to January and the fruit is a glabrous, egg-shaped to elliptical follicle 16–20 mm (0.63–0.79 in) long.

== Taxonomy and naming ==
This species was first formally described in 1848 by Carl Meissner who gave it the name Dryandra drummondii and published the description in Lehmann's Plantae Preissianae from specimens collected near the Swan River Colony by James Drummond. The specific epithet (drummondii) honours the collector of the type specimens.

In 1996, Alex George described three subspecies:

- Dryandra drummondii subsp. drummondii with a yellow pistil 43–60 mm (1.7–2.4 in) long and flowering in summer;
- Dryandra drummondii subsp. macrorufa with a red pistil 60–69 mm (2.4–2.7 in) long;
- Dryandra drummondii subsp. hiemalis with a yellow pistil 43–60 mm (1.7–2.4 in) long and flowering in winter.

In 2007, Austin Mast and Kevin Thiele transferred all Dryandra species to Banksia and Dryandra drummondii was renamed Banksia drummondii.

The changed names of the subspecies are as follows and are accepted at the Australian Plant Census:

- Banksia drummondii subsp. drummondii;
- Banksia drummondii subsp. hiemalis;
- Banksia drummondii subsp. macrorufa.

== Distribution and habitat ==
Subspecies drummondii occurs in the Stirling Range, extending to South Stirling and Kendenup and Ongerup, growing in mallee-kwongan. Subspecies hiemalis grows in forest and woodland between New Norcia and Wickepin. Subspecies macrorufa is only known from near Nyabing where it grows in low kwongan.

== Ecology ==
An assessment of the potential impact of climate change on this species found that its range is likely to contract by between 50% and 80% by 2080, depending on the severity of the change.

== Conservation status ==
Subspecies macrorufa is classified as "Priority Two" by the Western Australian Government Department of Parks and Wildlife meaning that it is poorly known and from only one or a few locations, but the other two subspecies are classified as "not threatened".
