= Banksia rufa subsp. rufa =

Scientific classification
- Kingdom: Plantae
- Clade: Tracheophytes
- Clade: Angiosperms
- Clade: Eudicots
- Order: Proteales
- Family: Proteaceae
- Genus: Banksia
- Species: B. rufa A.R.Mast & K.R.Thiele
- Subspecies: B. r. subsp. rufa

Trinomial name
- Banksia rufa subsp. rufa

Synonyms
- Dryandra ferruginea subsp. ferruginea; Dryandra runcinata Benth.

Subspecies of shrub

Banksia rufa subsp. rufa is a subspecies of Banksia rufa. It was known as Dryandra ferruginea subsp. ferruginea until 2007, when Austin Mast and Kevin Thiele sunk all Dryandra into Banksia. Since the name Banksia ferruginea had already been used, Mast and Thiele had to choose a new specific epithet for D. ferruginea and hence for this subspecies of it. As with other members of Banksia ser. Dryandra, it is endemic to the South West Botanical Province of Western Australia. As an autonym, it is defined as encompassing the type material of the species.
