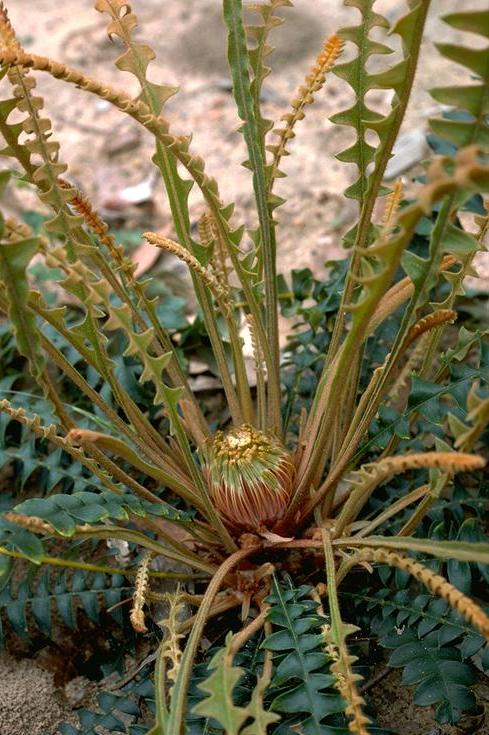

Scientific classification
- Kingdom: Plantae
- Clade: Tracheophytes
- Clade: Angiosperms
- Clade: Eudicots
- Order: Proteales
- Family: Proteaceae
- Genus: Banksia
- Subgenus: Banksia subg. Banksia
- Series: Banksia ser. Dryandra
- Species: B. calophylla

Binomial name
- Banksia calophylla (R.Br.) A.R.Mast & K.R.Thiele

Synonyms
- Dryandra calophylla R.Br.; Dryandra calophylla R.Br. var. calophylla; Josephia calophylla (R.Br.) Kuntze

= Banksia calophylla =

Species of shrub endemic to Western Australia

Banksia calophylla is a species of shrub that is endemic to Western Australia. It has a fire-tolerant, underground stem, pinnatifid leaves that have woolly hairs on the lower surface and heads of thirty to forty-five yellowish brown flowers surrounded by hairy bracts.

== Description ==
Banksia calophylla is a shrub with a fire-tolerant underground stem and pinnatifid leaves that are woolly hairy on their lower surface. The leaves are 150–350 mm (5.9–13.8 in) long and 20–55 mm (0.79–2.17 in) wide on a hairy petiole 20–40 mm (0.79–1.57 in) long, with between fifteen and twenty triangular lobes up to 28 mm (1.1 in) long on each side. The flowers are arranged in heads of between thirty and forty-five on the ends of the stems, surrounded by hairy egg-shaped to lance-shaped involucral bracts 10–15 mm (0.39–0.59 in) long. The flowers are scented with a brown perianth 40–41 mm (1.6–1.6 in) long and a cream-coloured pistil 38–39 mm (1.5–1.5 in) long.

== Taxonomy and naming ==
This species was first formally described in 1830 by Robert Brown who gave it the name Dryandra calophylla and published the description in the supplement to his Prodromus Florae Novae Hollandiae et Insulae Van Diemen. The specific epithet (calophylla) is derived from ancient Greek words meaning "beautiful" and "leaf". In 2007 Austin Mast and Kevin Thiele transferred all dryandras to the genus Banksia.

== Distribution and habitat ==
This banksia grows in shrubland and woodland between Tenterden, Albany and Wellstead in the Esperance Plains and Jarrah Forest biogeographic regions.
