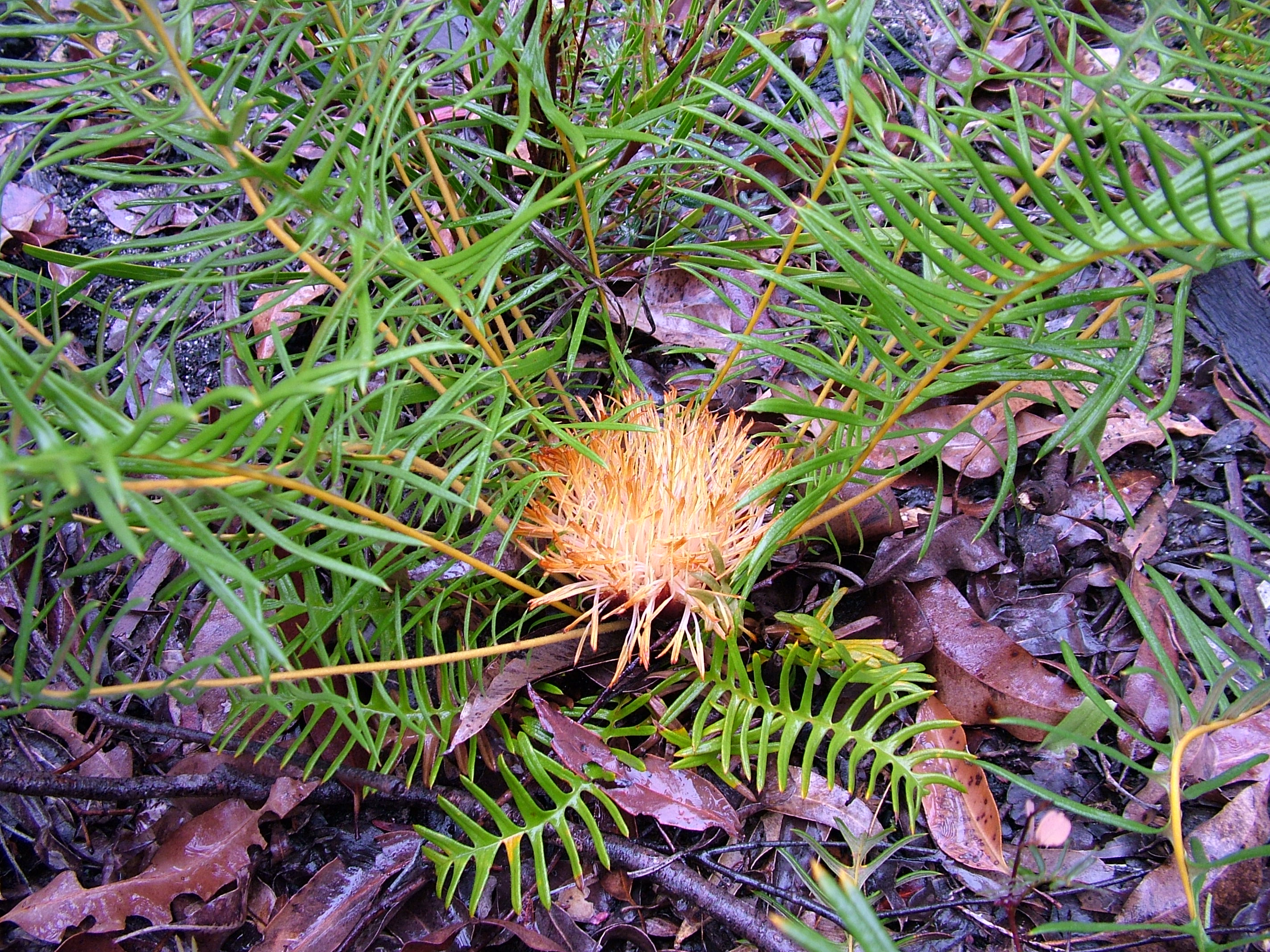
- Near Williams

Scientific classification
- Kingdom: Plantae
- Clade: Tracheophytes
- Clade: Angiosperms
- Clade: Eudicots
- Order: Proteales
- Family: Proteaceae
- Genus: Banksia
- Subgenus: Banksia subg. Banksia
- Series: Banksia ser. Dryandra
- Species: B. pellaeifolia

Binomial name
- Banksia pellaeifolia A.R.Mast and K.R.Thiele

Synonyms
- Dryandra blechnifolia R.Br.; Dryandra pteridifolia var. blechnifolia (R.Br.) R.Br. nom. inval., nom. nud.; Josephia blechnifolia (R.Br.) Poir.

= Banksia pellaeifolia =

Species of shrub endemic to Western Australia

Banksia pellaeifolia is a species of shrub that is endemic to the south-west of Western Australia. It has underground stems, deeply pinnatipartite leaves with twenty to thirty lobes on each side, yellowish-brown flowers in heads of about sixty-five, and egg-shaped follicles.

== Description ==
Banksia pellaeifolia is a shrub with hairy, underground, fire-tolerant stems and that typically grows to 1.7 m (5 ft 7 in) in diameter. The leaves are pinnatipartite, 200–350 mm (7.9–13.8 in) long and 50–130 mm (2.0–5.1 in) wide on a petiole 20–40 mm (0.79–1.57 in) long with between twenty and thirty linear, sharply pointed lobes on each side. The flowers are yellowish-brown and arranged in heads of sixty-five with egg-shaped to lance-shaped involucral bracts 35–40 mm (1.4–1.6 in) long at the base of the head. The perianth is 40–47 mm (1.6–1.9 in) long and the pistil 39–45 mm (1.5–1.8 in) long. Flowering occurs from May to August and the follicles are egg-shaped, 18–19 mm (0.71–0.75 in) long with scattered hairs.

== Taxonomy and naming ==
This species was first formally described in 1810 by Robert Brown who gave it the name Dryandra blechnifolia and published the description in the Transactions of the Linnean Society of London from specimens collected by Archibald Menzies near King George's Sound. The specific epithet (blechnifolia) was a reference to the fern genus Blechnum with a Latin ending meaning "-leaved".

In 2007, Austin Mast and Kevin Thiele transferred all the dryandras to the genus Banksia, but since there was already a species named Banksia blechnifolia, Mast and Thiele gave this species the name Banksia pellaeifolia. The epithet (pellaeifolia) refers to the fern genus Pellaea.

== Distribution and habitat ==
Banksia pellaeifolia grows in kwongan and is mostly found in the Stirling Range National Park and towards Ongerup.

== Ecology ==
An assessment of the potential impact of climate change on this species found that its range is likely to contract by between 50% and 80% by 2080, depending on the severity of the change.

== Conservation status ==
This banksia is classed as "not threatened" by the Western Australian Government Department of Parks and Wildlife.
