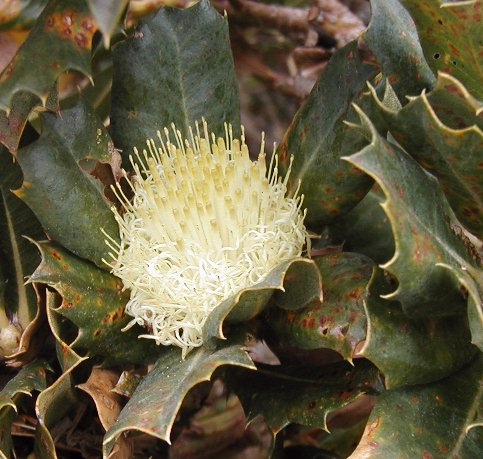
- Inflorescence of B. sessilis (Parrotbush), Cape Naturaliste

Scientific classification
- Kingdom: Plantae
- Clade: Embryophytes
- Clade: Tracheophytes
- Clade: Spermatophytes
- Clade: Angiosperms
- Clade: Eudicots
- Order: Proteales
- Family: Proteaceae
- Genus: Banksia
- Subgenus: Banksia subg. Banksia
- Series: Banksia ser. Dryandra (R.Br.) A.R.Mast & K.R.Thiele

Species
- 92, see list

= Banksia ser. Dryandra =

Series of plant species native to Australia

Banksia ser. Dryandra is a series of 94 species of shrub to small tree in the plant genus Banksia. It was considered a separate genus named Dryandra until early 2007, when it was merged into Banksia on the basis of extensive molecular and morphological evidence that Banksia was paraphyletic with respect to Dryandra.

== Taxonomy ==
The dryandras were named in honour of Swedish botanist Jonas C. Dryander. The first specimens of a Dryandra were collected by Archibald Menzies, surgeon and naturalist to the Vancouver Expedition. At the request of Joseph Banks, Menzies collected natural history specimens wherever possible during the voyage. During September and October 1791, while the expedition were anchored at King George Sound, he collected numerous plant specimens, including the first specimens of B. sessilis (Parrotbush) and B. pellaeifolia. Upon Menzies' return to England, he turned his specimens over to Banks; as with most other specimens in Banks' library, they remained undescribed for many years.

Further specimens were collected in late 1792 by Jacques Labillardière, one of five naturalists in Bruni d'Entrecasteaux's expedition in search of the lost expedition of Jean-François de La Pérouse. While ashore west of Esperance Bay between 11 and 18 December, Labillardière collected the first specimens of B. nivea (Honeypot Dryandra).

== Description ==
They are arguably among the most attractive and showy of all members of Proteaceae.

Banksia ser. Dryandra species are used as food plants by the larvae of some Lepidoptera species, including the Dryandra moth.

== Distribution and habitat ==
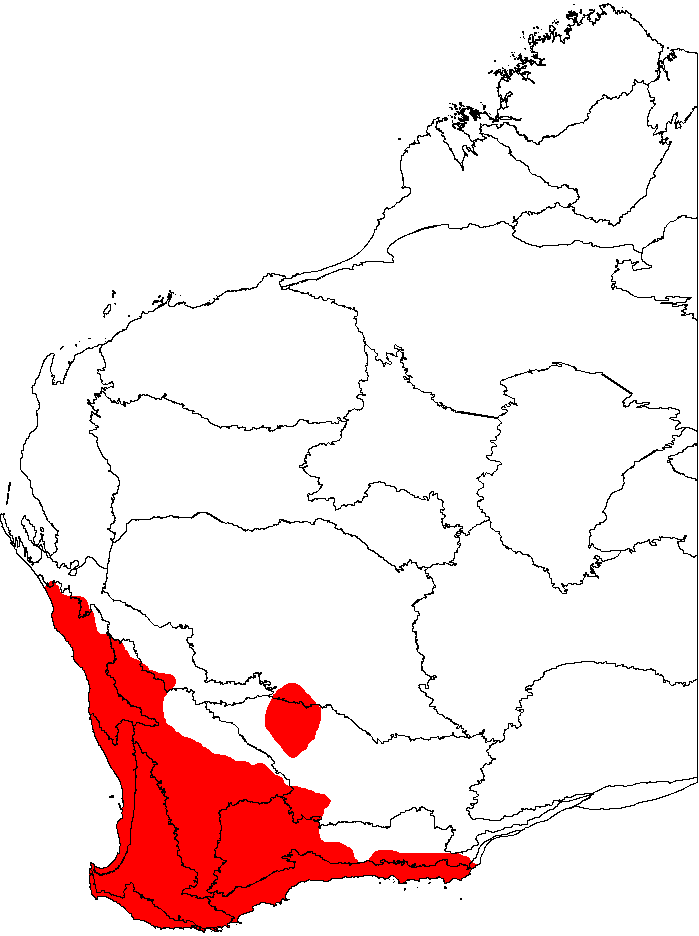
Distribution of B. ser. Dryandra, shown on a map of Western Australia's biogeographic regions

Endemic to Western Australia, Dryandra occurs virtually throughout the South West Botanic Province, and also, to a much lesser degree, in southwest parts of the Eremaean Province.

== Cultivation ==
The species are found only in the southwestern corner of Western Australia. They have never been popular among gardeners among the rest of Australia due to their dislike of the humid and subtropical conditions which dominate the east coast.
