= Kevin Thiele =

Australian botanist

Kevin R. Thiele
- Born: 1959 (age 66–67)
- Education: Ph.D.
- Scientific career
- Fields: Botany
- Author abbrev. (botany): K.R.Thiele

Kevin R. Thiele is currently an adjunct associate professor at the University of Western Australia and the director of Taxonomy Australia. He was the curator of the Western Australian Herbarium from 2006 to 2015. His research interests include the systematics of the plant families Proteaceae, Rhamnaceae, Violaceae and Dilleniaceae and the conservation ecology of grassy woodland ecosystems. He also works in biodiversity informatics, developing and teaching the development of interactive multi-access keys, and has been involved in the design of software for the Global Biodiversity Information Facility.

He obtained a PhD from the University of Melbourne in 1993, and has since published many papers, notably a treatment of the Rhamnaceae for the Flora of Australia series of monographs, and, with Pauline Ladiges, a taxonomic arrangement of Banksia. In 2007 he collaborated with Austin Mast to transfer Dryandra to Banksia. More recently, he has worked on pollination systems, taxonomy, vegetation dynamics, and described further new species.

In 2021, Kevin Thiele and Tim Hammer submitted a proposals to amend the International Code of Nomenclature for algae, fungi, and plants to allow the rejection of offensive scientific names.

He has contributed over 2000 images to Wikipedia Commons of Western Australian plants and weeds.

== Selected recent publications ==
- Kwiatkowska, M.; Bohdanowicz, J.; Cubała, M.; Słomka, A.; Żabicka, J.; Żabicki, P.; Migdałek, G.; Marcussen, T.; Thiele, K.; Kuta, E. (2019). "A new pollination system in non-cleistogamous species of Viola results from nyctinastic (night-closing) petal movements – A mixed outcrossing-selfing strategy". Flora. 253: 1–9. doi:10.1016/j.flora.2019.01.007. ISSN 0367-2530. S2CID 91905838.
- Hammer, T.A.; Davis, R.W.; Thiele, K.R. (2019). "Of a different feather: two new species of featherheads from the Ptilotus macrocephalus (Amaranthaceae) complex". Australian Systematic Botany. doi:10.1071/SB18065. ISSN 1030-1887.
- Anderson, B.M; Thiele, K.R.; Grierson, P.F.; Krauss, S.L.; Nevill, P.G.; Small, I.D.; Zhong, X.; Barrett, M.D. (2019). "Recent range expansion in Australian hummock grasses (Triodia) inferred using genotyping-by-sequencing". AoB Plants. 11 (2) plz017. doi:10.1093/aobpla/plz017. ISSN 2041-2851. PMC 6481909. PMID 31037212.

== Some taxa authored by K.R.Thiele ==
- Category:Taxa named by Kevin Thiele
