= Department of Biodiversity, Conservation and Attractions =

Government department in Western Australia

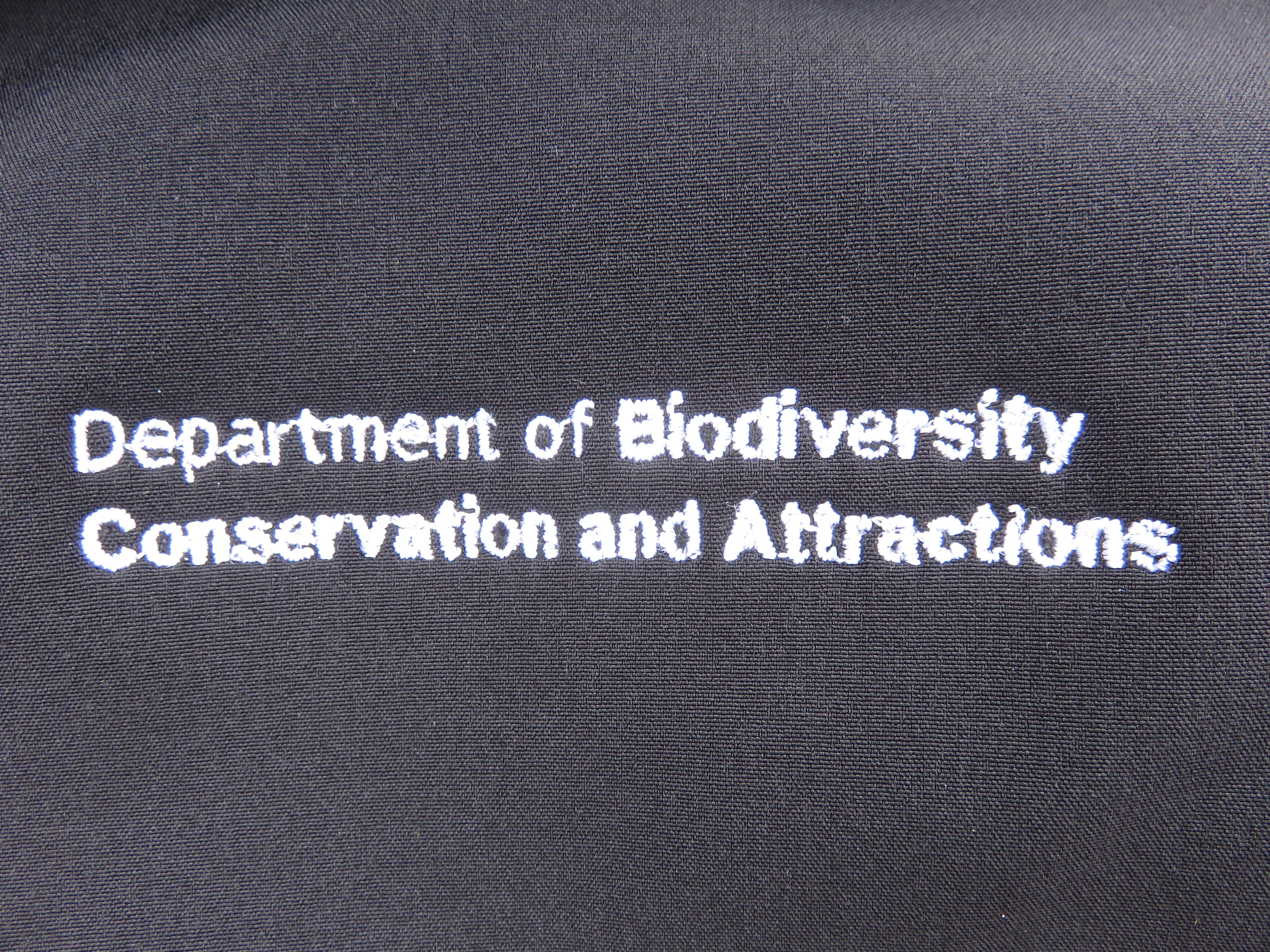
- Chest embroidery for Western Australia Department of Biodiversity, Conservation and Attractions, 2018

Agency overview
- Formed: 1 July 2017
- Preceding agency: Department of Parks and Wildlife
- Jurisdiction: Government of Western Australia
- Agency executive: Mark Webb, Director General
- Website: www.dbca.wa.gov.au

The Department of Biodiversity, Conservation and Attractions (DBCA) is the Western Australian government department responsible for managing lands and waters described in the Conservation and Land Management Act 1984, the Rottnest Island Authority Act 1987, the Swan and Canning Rivers Management Act 2006, the Botanic Gardens and Parks Authority Act 1998, and the Zoological Parks Authority Act 2001, and implementing the state's conservation and environment legislation and regulations. The department reports to the Minister for Environment and the Minister for Tourism.

DBCA was formed on 1 July 2017 by the merger of the Department of Parks and Wildlife (DPaW), the Botanic Gardens and Parks Authority, the Zoological Parks Authority and the Rottnest Island Authority. The former DPaW became the Parks and Wildlife Service.

== Status ==
=== Parks and Wildlife Service ===
The Formerly Department of Parks and Wildlife. As of September 2018 the Parks and Wildlife Service has management responsibilities in:

- nature reserves (10,271,781 ha)
- 101 national parks (6,259,241 ha)
- 19 conservation parks (1,085,561 ha)
- 18 marine parks (4,424,612 ha)
- 1 marine nature reserve (132,000 ha)
- 2 marine management areas (143,385 ha)
- section 5(1)(g) & (h) reserves (1,096,929 ha)
- timber reserves (123,174 ha)
- state forests (1,307,589 ha)
- other lands and waters throughout the state

As of 30 June 2018 the total area under Parks and Wildlife's care is 31,590,422 hectares (78,061,630 acres). The land area managed by the Department (25,001,213 ha) is about 9.45 per cent of the land area of Western Australia.

WA national parks and reserves had 20.39 million visitors in 2017–18, with a visitor satisfaction level of 92.5 per cent. Each year, Parks and Wildlife and its predecessors aimed for a satisfaction rating above 85 per cent, a figure it had achieved for more than 10 consecutive years.

Volunteers continued in 2017–18 to make a significant contribution to the Department's work, with the number of Parks and Wildlife Service registered volunteers reaching 15,797, of whom 5657 contributed 781,766 hours to projects across the state.

Parks and Wildlife is responsible for the wildlife conservation project Western Shield, a pest animal and weed control program that included 4 million hectares of conservation reserves and state forests baited for feral animal control, as well as weed control on more than 89 million hectares of unallocated Crown land and unmanaged reserves.

There are a number of internationally recognised biodiversity hotspots within Western Australia and in particular in the south west of the state.

Parks and Wildlife Service also manages two long-distance trails: the 1,000 km Bibbulmun Track for walkers, and the 1,000 km Munda Biddi Trail for mountain bikes.

An important duty of the Department (with the help of the Forest Products Commission crews) is to be responsible for bushfire prevention and suppression on its lands as well as fire prevention in unallocated Crown land and unmanaged reserves. This includes conducting controlled burns to reduced fuel load, and research into the behaviour and effects of bushfires.

The Department achieved 218,965 hectares of prescribed burning in the south-west forest regions in 2017–18, marking the first time the nominal target of 200,000 hectares was achieved in consecutive years since 1996–97. A further 4,692,079 hectares was burnt in the Department's other six regions: the Kimberley, Pilbara, Goldfields, Mid West, Wheatbelt and South Coast.

Departmental staff attended and monitored 688 bushfires, which burnt approximately 2,780,972 hectares in 2017–18.

=== Rottnest Island Authority ===
Rottnest Island chest logo on a Ranger polo, 2018

Rottnest Island is an A Class Reserve situated in the Indian Ocean, 18 kilometres west of Fremantle, and includes 3,800 hectares of Marine Reserve with five sanctuary zones. The island is 11 kilometres long and 4.5 kilometres at its widest point. It has 63 sheltered beaches and 20 bays with a land area of 1,900 hectares.

Rottnest Island is one of the most popular recreation and holiday destinations in Western Australia, valued for its scenic natural environment with iconic protected quokka population. It is also the state's largest holiday resort, attracting 734,637 visitors per year during the financial year 2017-18 (+14% year growth). During that period, the Visitor Centre checked in 24,670 visitors to RIA-managed accommodation. The Rottnest sustainability action plan defines a set of short to long-term sustainability goals for the island community. As an example, this last financial year was the first year that zero water was extracted from the Wadjemup Aquifer.

=== Botanic Garden and Parks Authority ===
The Botanic Gardens and Parks Authority (BGPA) is responsible for the care, control and management of Bold Park and Kings Park, including the Western Australian Botanic Garden.

=== Zoological Parks Authority ===
The Perth Zoo has a notable expertise in conservation, research, animal husbandry, community engagement and education. In 2017–18, the Perth Zoo:

- was the custodian of more than 1,300 individual animals from 171 species
- has an average level of visitor satisfaction of 97%
- has a number of threatened species offspring bred for release into natural habitats of 47 western swamp tortoise and 19 numbats
- has a collection of 121 natives species (100 from WA / 21 from the rest of Australia) and 50 exotic species
- has an entire collection of 5 species of invertebrates, 8 of fishes, 6 of amphibians, 53 of reptiles, 46 of birds and 53 of mammals
- has released to the wild:
  - 65 orange-bellied frogs
  - 139 white-bellied frogs
  - 30 western swamp tortoises
  - 69 dibblers
  - 20 numbats
- admitted 302 wild black cockatoos of three different species for treatment

== Preceding agencies ==
Earlier forms of nature conservation in Western Australia were under:

- Department of Lands and Surveys: 1 January 1890 – (partly split) 31 December 1895
- Wood and Forests Department: 1 January 1896 – 31 December 1918
- Forests Department: 1 January 1919 – 21 March 1985
- State Gardens Board: 15 December 1920 – 30 April 1957 (Parks and Reserves Act 1895)
- National Parks Board: 1 May 1957 – 30 July 1977
- Department of Fisheries and Fauna: 1 October 1964 – 31 December 1973
- National Parks Authority: 1 August 1977 – 15 April 1985 National Parks Authority (National Parks Authority Act 1976)
- Wildlife section of the Department of Fisheries and Wildlife: 1 January 1974 – 21 March 1985
- Department of Conservation and Land Management (CALM): 22 March 1985 – 30 June 2006 (Conservation and Land Management Act 1984)
- Department of Environment and Conservation (DEC): 1 July 2006 – 30 June 2013
- Swan River Trust: 1989 (Swan and Canning Rivers Management Act 2006) – 1 July 2015
- Botanic Gardens and Parks Authority: – 30 June 2017
- Zoological Gardens Board: 1897–2002
- Zoological Parks Authority: 22 May 2002 – 30 June 2017
- Rottnest Island Boards: 1917–1956–1988
- Rottnest Island Authority: 1988 – 30 June 2017
- Department of Parks and Wildlife (DPaW): 1 July 2013 – 30 June 2017

== Vehicles ==
The Department maintained and coordinated a range of specialist equipment and emergency response vehicles. This included pumpers and tankers and other equipment relating to operations involving search and rescue and firefighting.

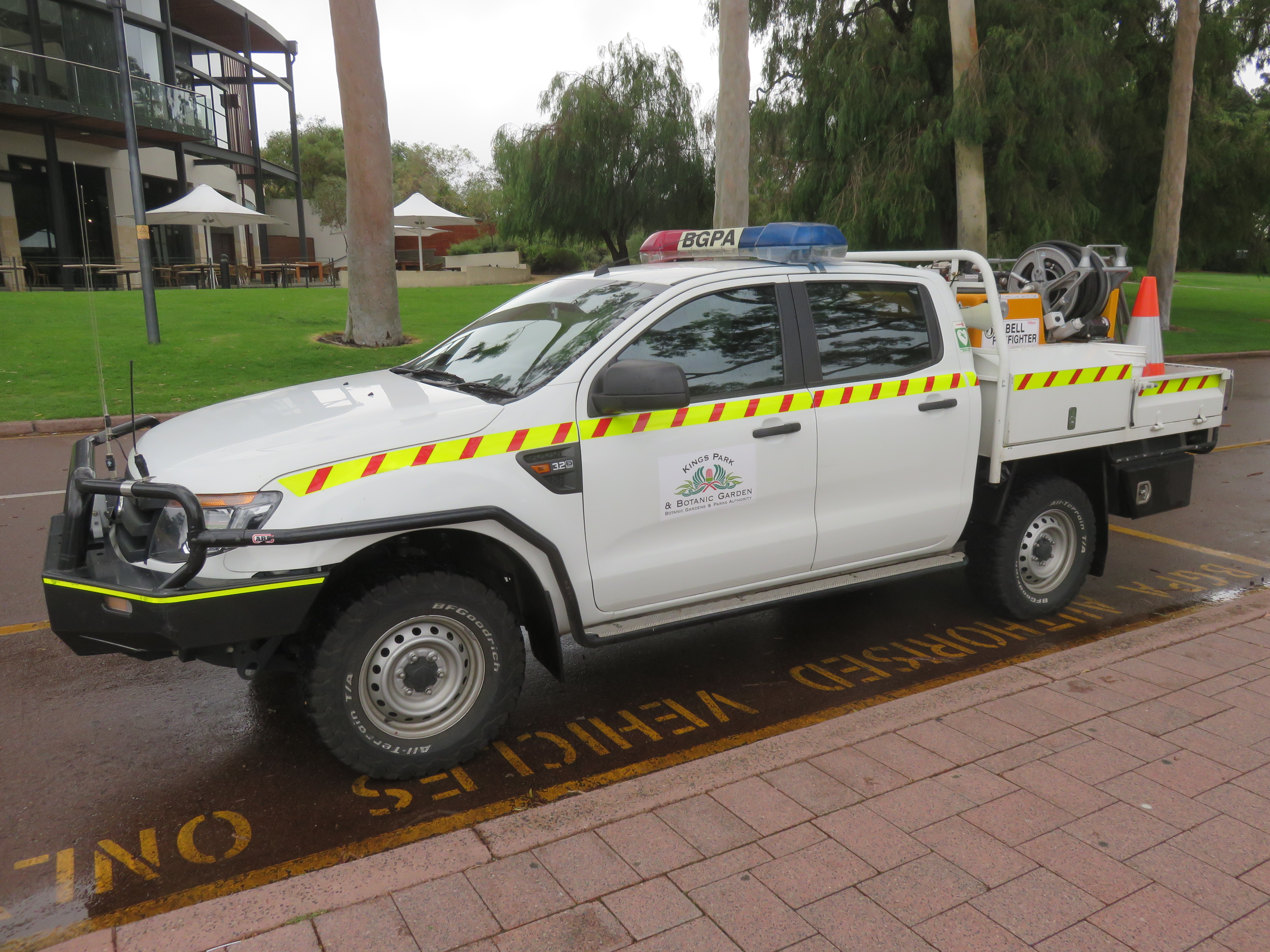
Light unit pumper fire appliance Ford Ranger 3.2 / 6 at Kings Park, BGPA, March 2018

== Uniforms and equipment ==
Parks and Wildlife Service has three types of uniforms:

- a standard khaki shirt and bottle green (or khaki) trousers uniform with appropriate badging, supplied to and worn by staff whose duties included the monitoring of legislative compliance (National Park and Marine rangers, Conservation and Land Management officers, forest officers, wildlife officers and authorised CALM officers under Bush Fire Act)
- a work wear (khaki or high visibility yellow and bottle green shirt and bottle green trousers) for those that work in the field and personal protective equipment or clothing (TecaSafe gold overshirt, TecaSafe dark green trousers and vest, Kevlar helmet with goggles, gloves, belt and fire boots) for staff who are involved in fire management activities
- a corporate apparel worn by employees who are in regular contact with the public or members of other departments (sand, grey or white shirt, black or charcoal trousers)
