= Department of Parks and Wildlife =

Former government department of Western Australia

Agency overview
- Formed: 1 July 2013
- Preceding agency: Department of Environment and Conservation (DEC)
- Dissolved: 30 June 2017
- Superseding agency: Department of Biodiversity, Conservation and Attractions
- Jurisdiction: Government of Western Australia
- Agency executive: Jim Sharp, Director General
- Child agency: Department of Biodiversity, Conservation and Attractions
- Website: dpaw.wa.gov.au

The Department of Parks and Wildlife (DPaW) was the department of the Government of Western Australia responsible for managing lands described in the Conservation and Land Management Act 1984 and implementing the state's conservation and environment legislation and regulations. The minister responsible for the department was the Minister for the Environment.

== History ==
The Department of Environment and Conservation (DEC) was separated on 30 June 2013, forming the Department of Parks and Wildlife (DPaW) and the Department of Environment Regulation (DER), both of which commenced operations on 1 July 2013.

DPaW focused on managing multiple use state forests, national parks, marine parks and reserves. DER focused on environmental regulation, approvals and appeals processes, and pollution prevention.

It was announced on 28 April 2017 that the Department of Parks and Wildlife would merge with the Botanic Gardens and Parks Authority, the Zoological Parks Authority and the Rottnest Island Authority on 1 July 2017 to form the Department of Biodiversity, Conservation and Attractions.

== Status (at dissolution, 30 June 2017) ==
The Department of Parks and Wildlife had management responsibilities in:

- nature reserves (10,267,826 ha)
- 100 national parks (6,267,602 ha)
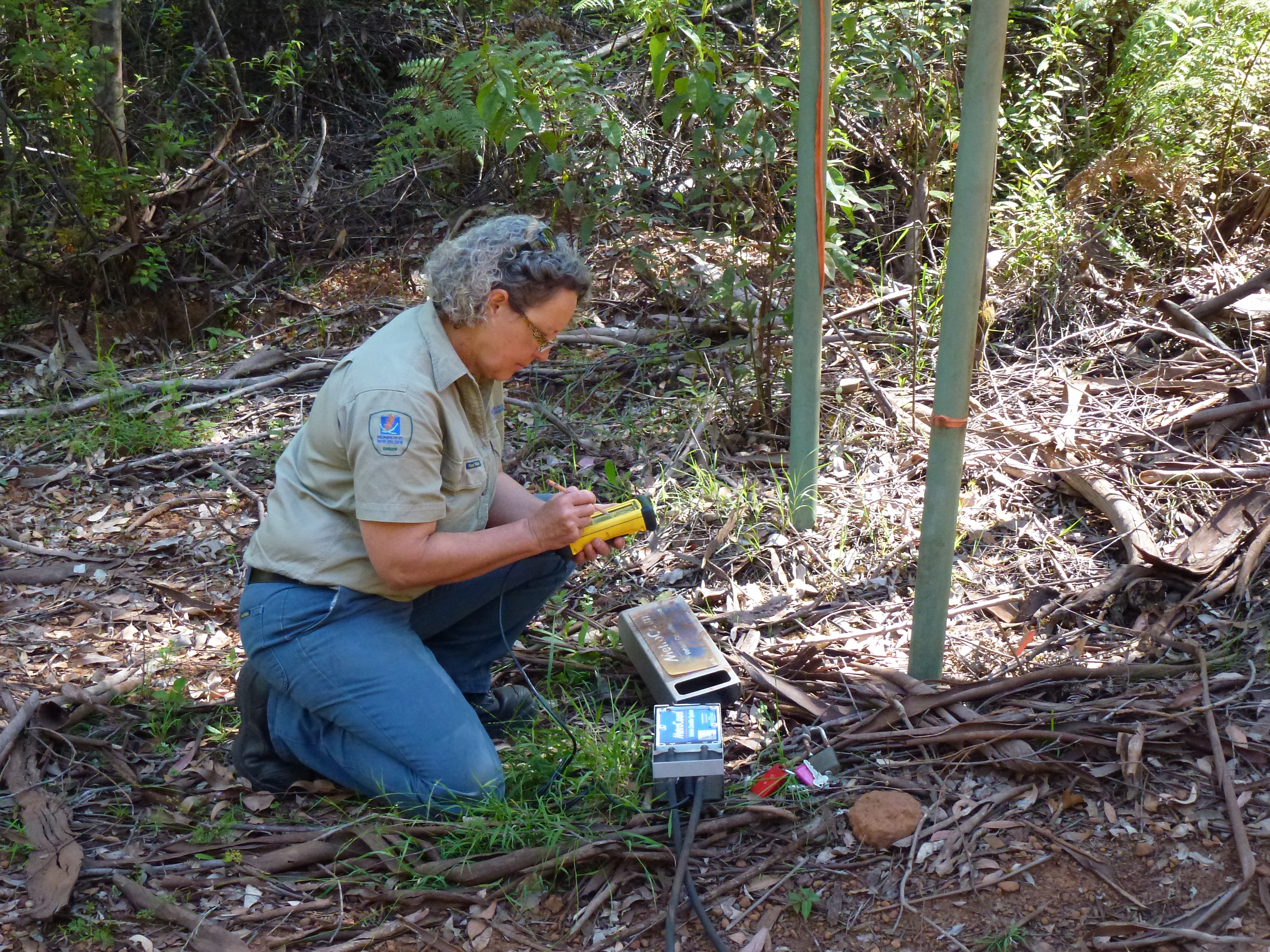
  Western Australia Parks and Wildlife National Park Ranger assessing public frequentation on a Metro Count Vehicle Classifier System, Warren National Park, Donnelly District, December 2014.
- 19 conservation parks (1,084,346 ha)
- 17 marine parks (4,307,613 ha)
- 1 marine nature reserve (132,000 ha)
- 2 marine management areas (143,000 ha)
- State forests (1,309,755 ha)
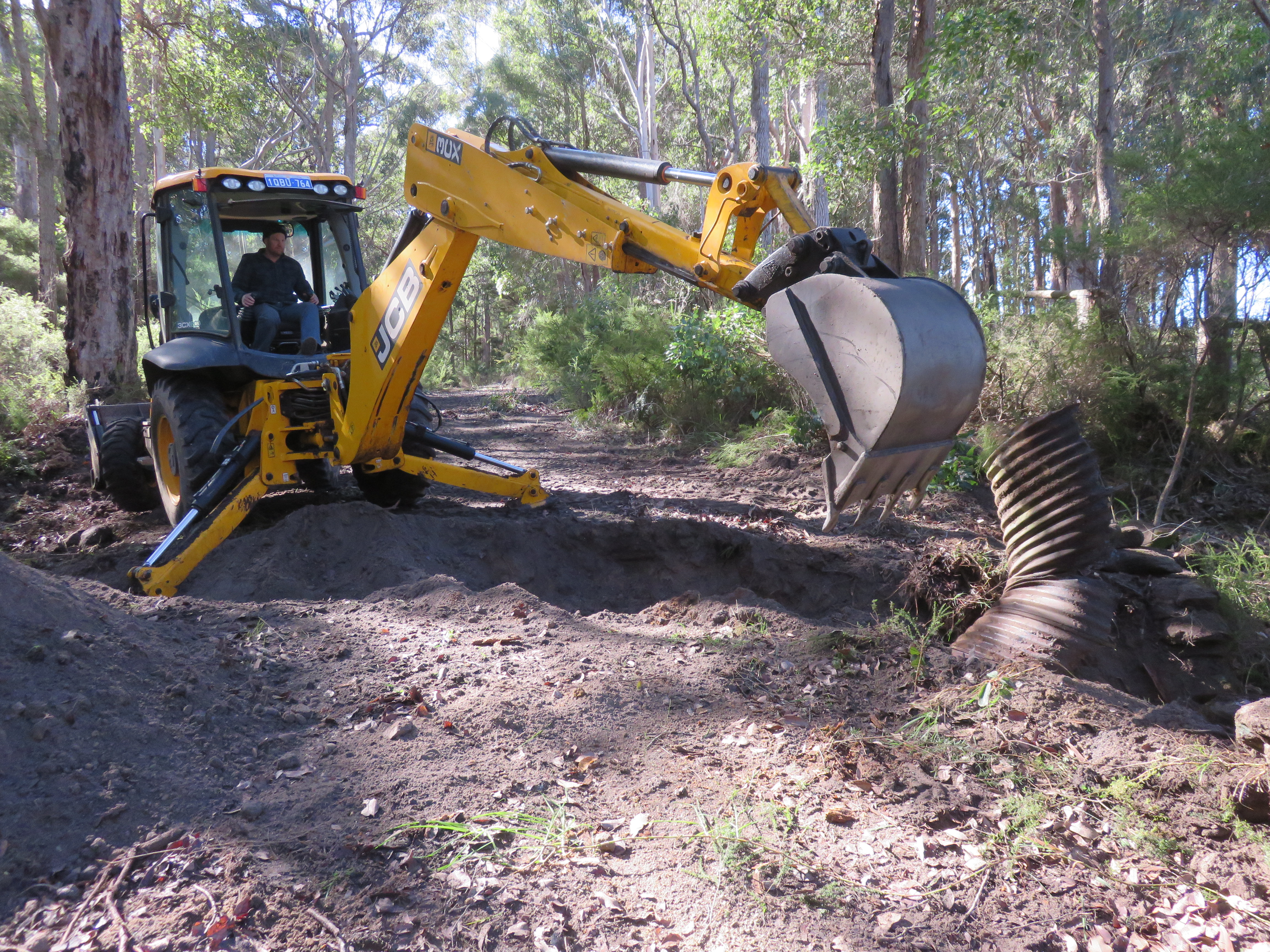
  Western Australia Parks and Wildlife Conservation Employee changing a culvert pipe at Dombakup Block, Warren State Forest in May 2015.
  and
- other lands and waters throughout the state

As of 30 June 2017, the total area under Parks and Wildlife's care was 31,480,868 ha. The land area managed by the department was about 10.6 per cent of the land area of Western Australia.

The lands and waters managed by the department received in 2014–15 18.6 million visits a year, with visitor satisfaction at a high level of 89%. The average level of visitor satisfaction with their visit on Parks & Wildlife lands and waters was of 91.4% in 2015–16. Western Australian national parks and reserves received 20 million visits in a single year for the first time in 2016–17 and a visitor satisfaction level of 92.5 per cent. Each year Parks and Wildlife aimed for a satisfaction rating above 85 per cent, a figure it had achieved for more than 10 consecutive years.

10,910 people were registered volunteers with the department in 2014–15 that helped in a range of projects across the State with 610,000 hours contributed. During 2015–16, 5,189 active volunteers of the total 13,737 registered individuals contributed 638,747 voluntary hours to more than 200 Parks and Wildlife environmental and recreational programs. In 2016–17, Parks and Wildlife's volunteers have contributed to a record number of hours to help conserve and manage WA's natural places, with 5,410 volunteers contributing 723,508 hours.

Parks and Wildlife was responsible for the wildlife conservation project Western Shield, a pest animal and weed control program that included 4 million hectares of conservation reserves and State forests baited for feral animal control, as well as weed control on more than 89 million hectares of unallocated Crown land and unmanaged reserves.

There are a number of internationally recognised biodiversity hotspots within Western Australia and in particular in the south west of the state.

Parks and Wildlife also managed two long-distance trails: the 1,000 km Bibbulmun Track for walkers, and the 1,000 km Munda Biddi Trail for cyclists.

An important duty of the Department (with the help of the Forest Products Commission crews) was to be responsible for bushfire prevention and suppression on its lands as well as fire prevention in unallocated Crown land and unmanaged reserves. This included conducting controlled burns to reduced fuel load, and research into the behaviour and effects of bushfires.

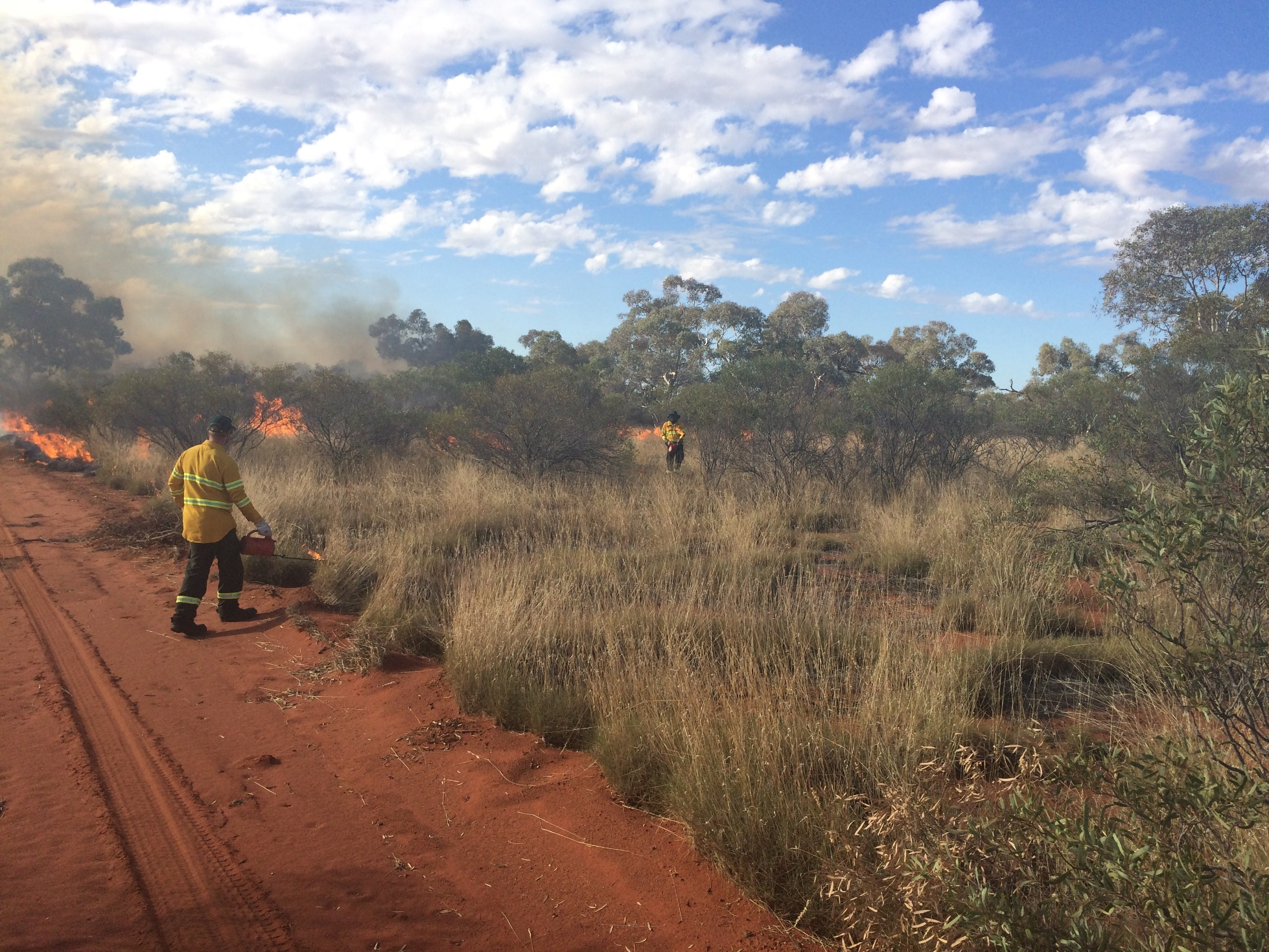
WA Parks and Wildlife fire crew lighting a prescribed burn at Octopus Bore track buffer, Lorna Glen former pastoral lease, now joint managed with traditional owners, May 2015.

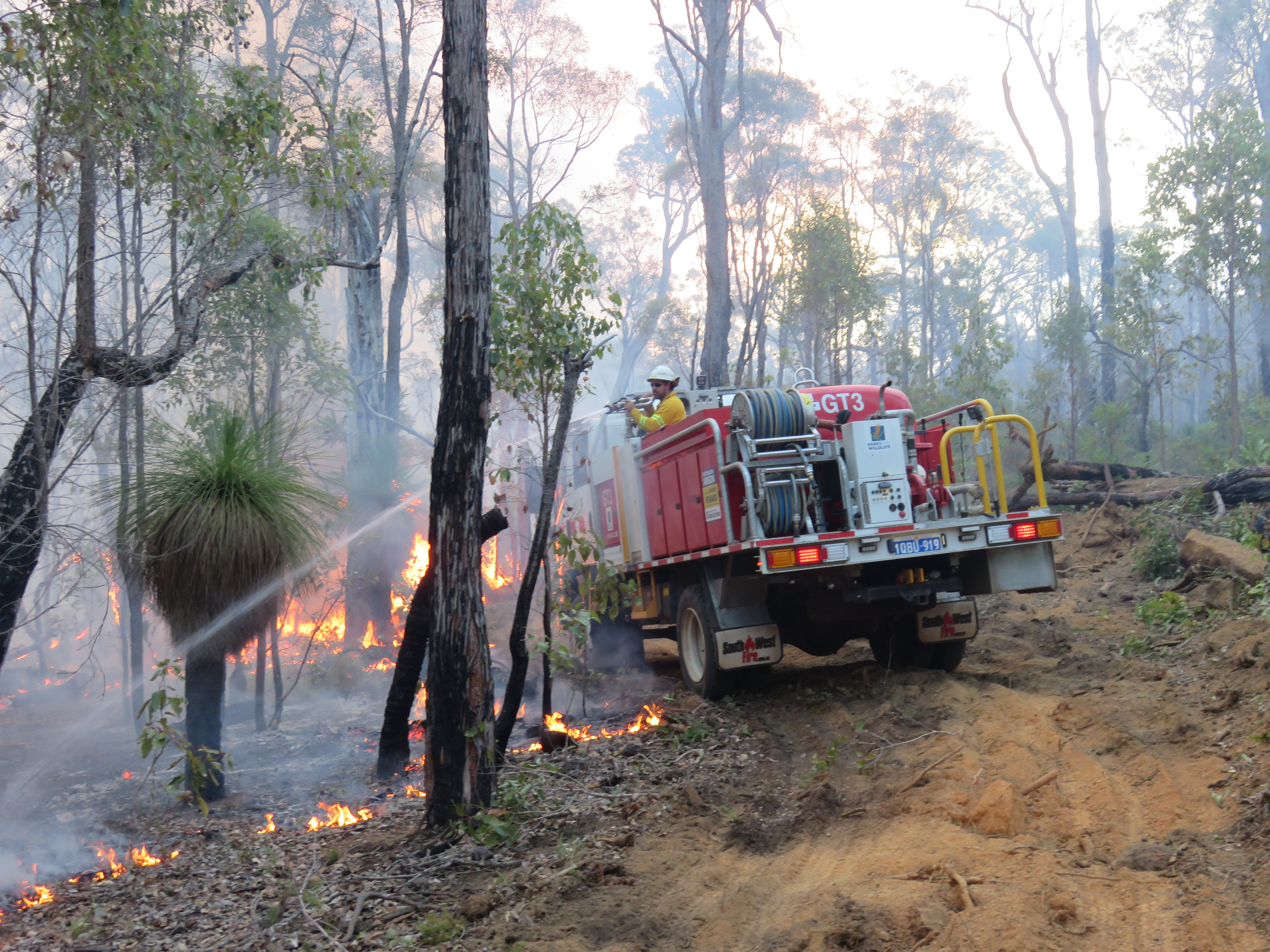
Western Australia Parks and Wildlife Fire Fighters mopping up the fireline with the help of a Gang Truck fire appliance (GT3 - Donnelly 36) after a machinery constructed track was opened on a bushfire on Topanup Block, Tone State Forest, March 2015.

More than 247,360 hectares were prescribed burnt in the three forest regions during the 2016–17 financial year, in addition to the significant burns that have been undertaken by staff in the South Coast, Goldfields, Wheatbelt, Mid West, Pilbara and Kimberley regions up to 2,988,394 hectares.

Some of the most severe West Australian bushfires that the department had to suppress, in chronological order, include:

Fire	Location	Area burned (1 ha ≈ 2.5 acres)	Date	Human fatalities	Livestock death/Properties damaged
2014 Parkerville bushfire	Western Australia	386 ha	12 January 2014	0	56 homes.
2015 O'Sullivan bushfire (Northcliffe – Windy Harbour)	Western Australia	98,923 ha	29 January – 20 February 2015	0	1 home and 1 inhabited shed, 5 farm sheds and thousands of production State Forests (karri and jarrah) or National Parks.
2015 Lower Hotham bushfire (Boddington)	Western Australia	52,373 ha	January 2015	0	1 house, 1 farm shed, 1 bridge and thousands of production State Forests (jarrah) or National Parks.
2015 Esperance bushfires	Western Australia	more than 200,000 ha	October – November 2015	4	About 10 houses and public buildings (Scaddan), 15,000 stock losses, 5 Nature Reserves et most area of Cape Arid National Park.
2015 Perth Hills bushfire complex – Solus Group	Western Australia	10,016 ha	15 to 24 November 2015	0	Jarrah production State Forests and Conservation Park.
2016 Waroona–Yarloop bushfire (Waroona and Yarloop)	Western Australia	69,165 ha	January 2016	2	181 dwellings (166 only in Yarloop) and thousands of hectares of production State Forests (jarrah).

== Preceding agencies ==
Earlier forms of Nature conservation in Western Australia were under:

- Department of Lands and Surveys: 1 January 1890 – (partly split) 31 December 1895
- Wood and Forests Department: 1 January 1896 – 31 December 1918
- Forests Department: 1 January 1919 – 21 March 1985
- State Gardens Board: 15 December 1920 – 30 April 1957 (Parks and Reserves Act 1895)
- National Parks Board: 1 May 1957 – 30 July 1977
- Department of Fisheries and Fauna: 1 October 1964 – 31 December 1973
- National Parks Authority: 1 August 1977 – 15 April 1985 (National Parks Authority Act 1976)
- Wildlife section of the Department of Fisheries and Wildlife: 1 January 1974 – 21 March 1985
- Department of Conservation and Land Management (CALM): 22 March 1985 – 30 June 2006 (Conservation and Land Management Act 1984)
- Department of Environment and Conservation (DEC): 1 July 2006 – 30 June 2013
- Swan River Trust: 1989 (Swan and Canning Rivers Management Act 2006) – 1 July 2015

== Vehicles ==
The department maintained and coordinated a range of specialist equipment and emergency response vehicles. This included pumpers and tankers and other equipment relating to operations involving search and rescue and firefighting.

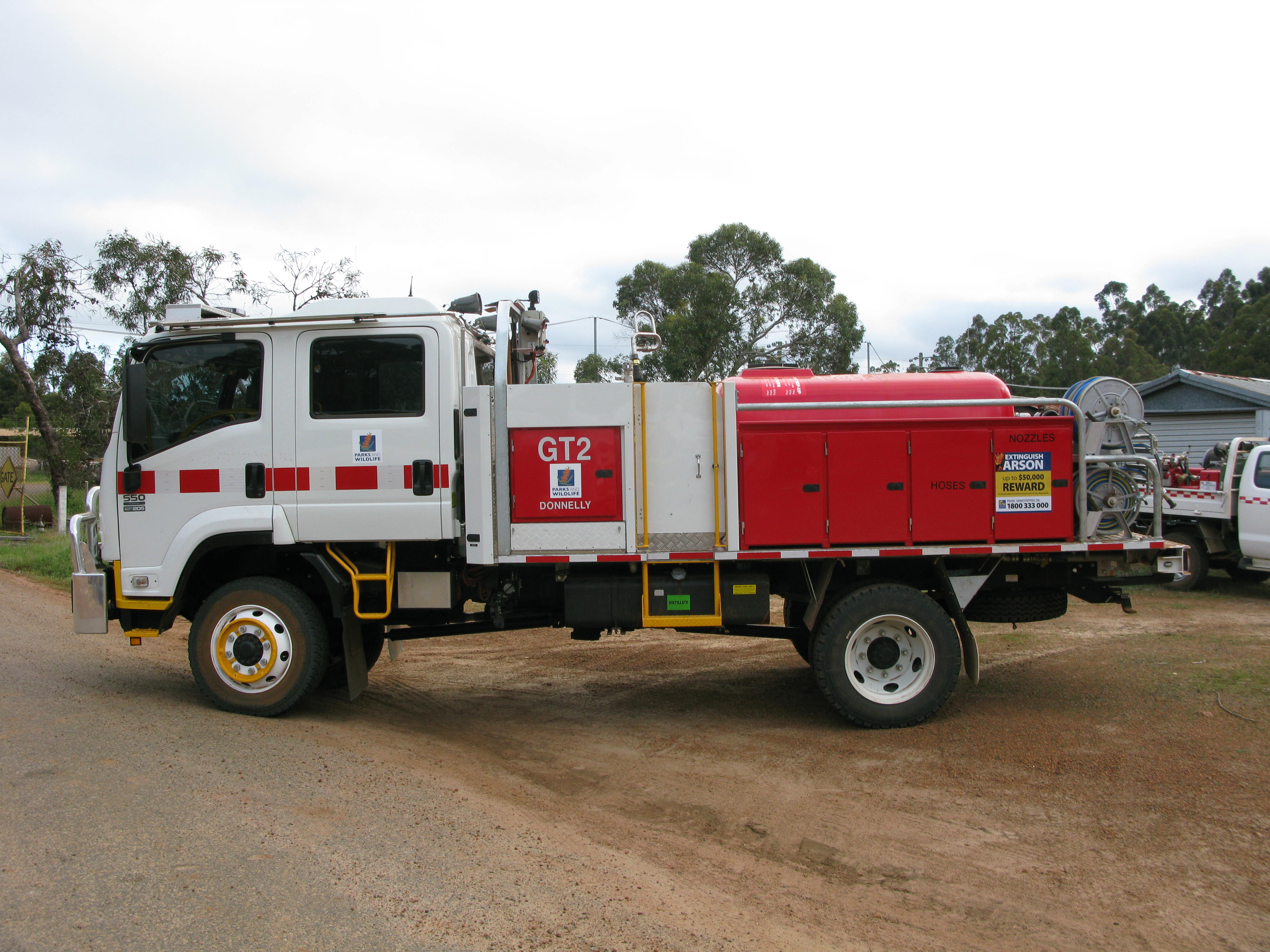
Gang truck fire appliance Izusu 550 (GT2 – Donnelly 37) at Dwellingup in October 2014.

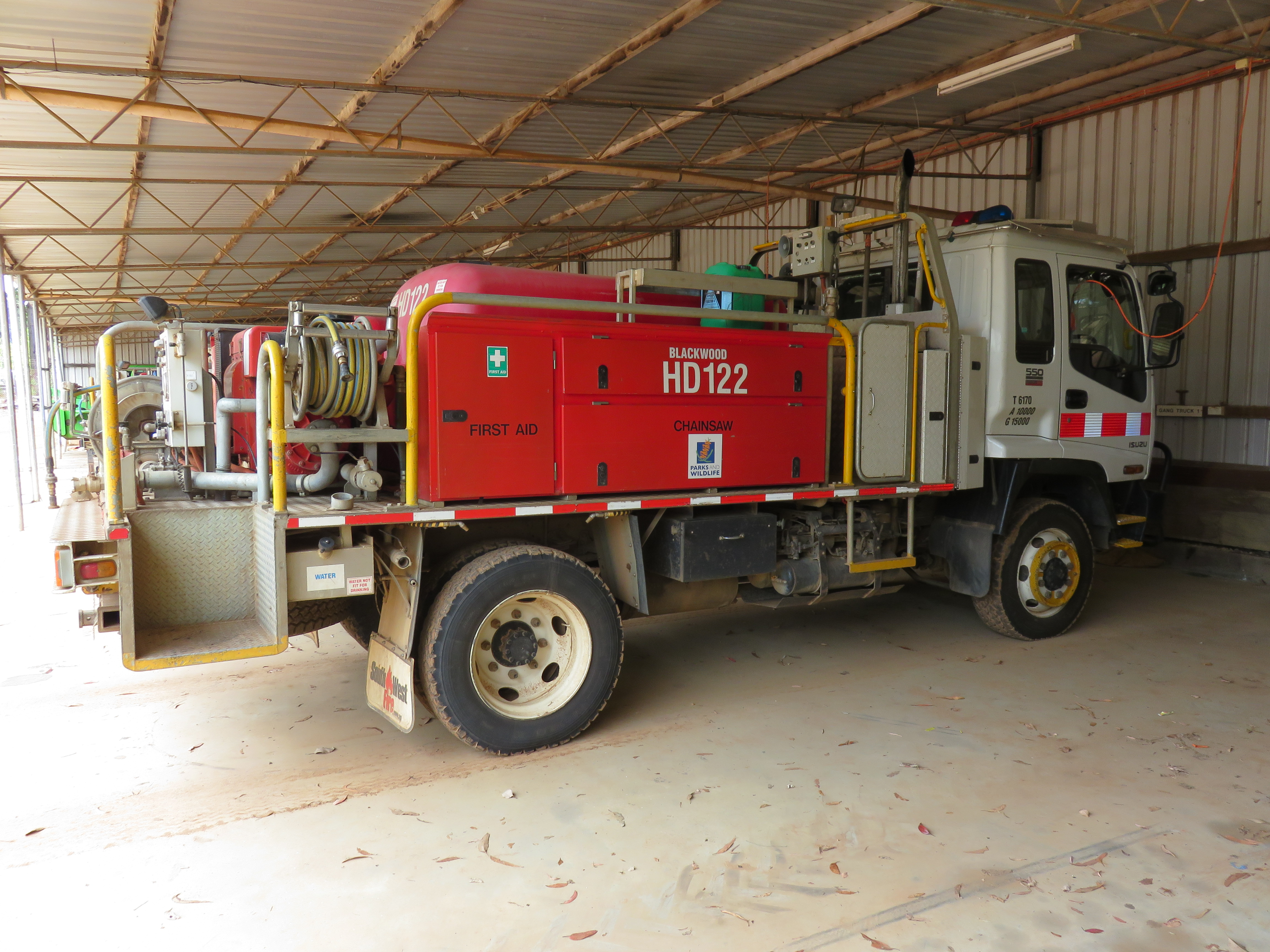
Heavy duty fire appliance Izusu 550 (HD122 – Blackwood 44) at Pemberton depot in March 2015.

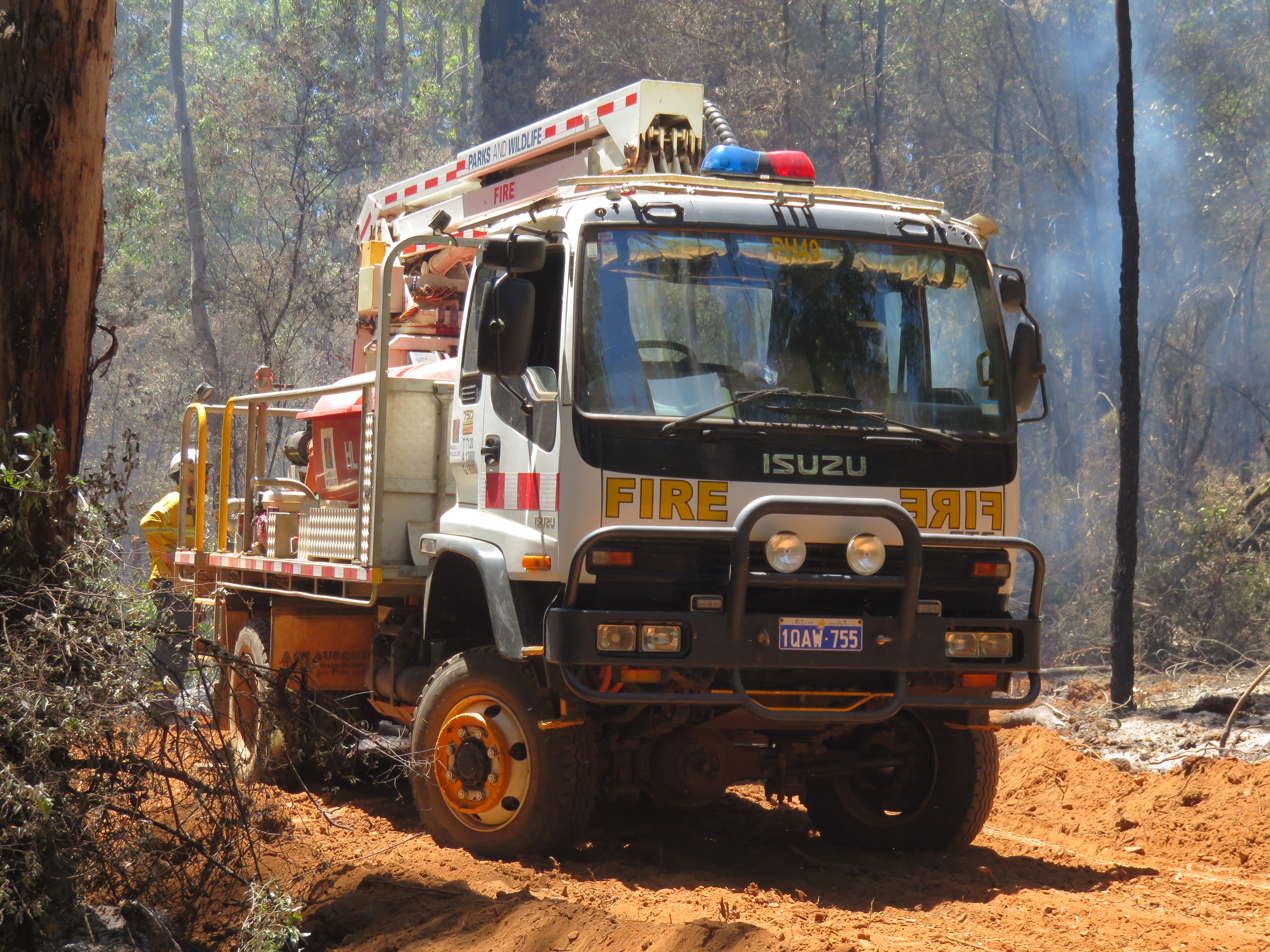
High lift fire appliance Izusu 750 (HL3 – Perth Hills 49) at 100 Years Old Forest prescribed burning, Donnelly State Forest, January 2017.

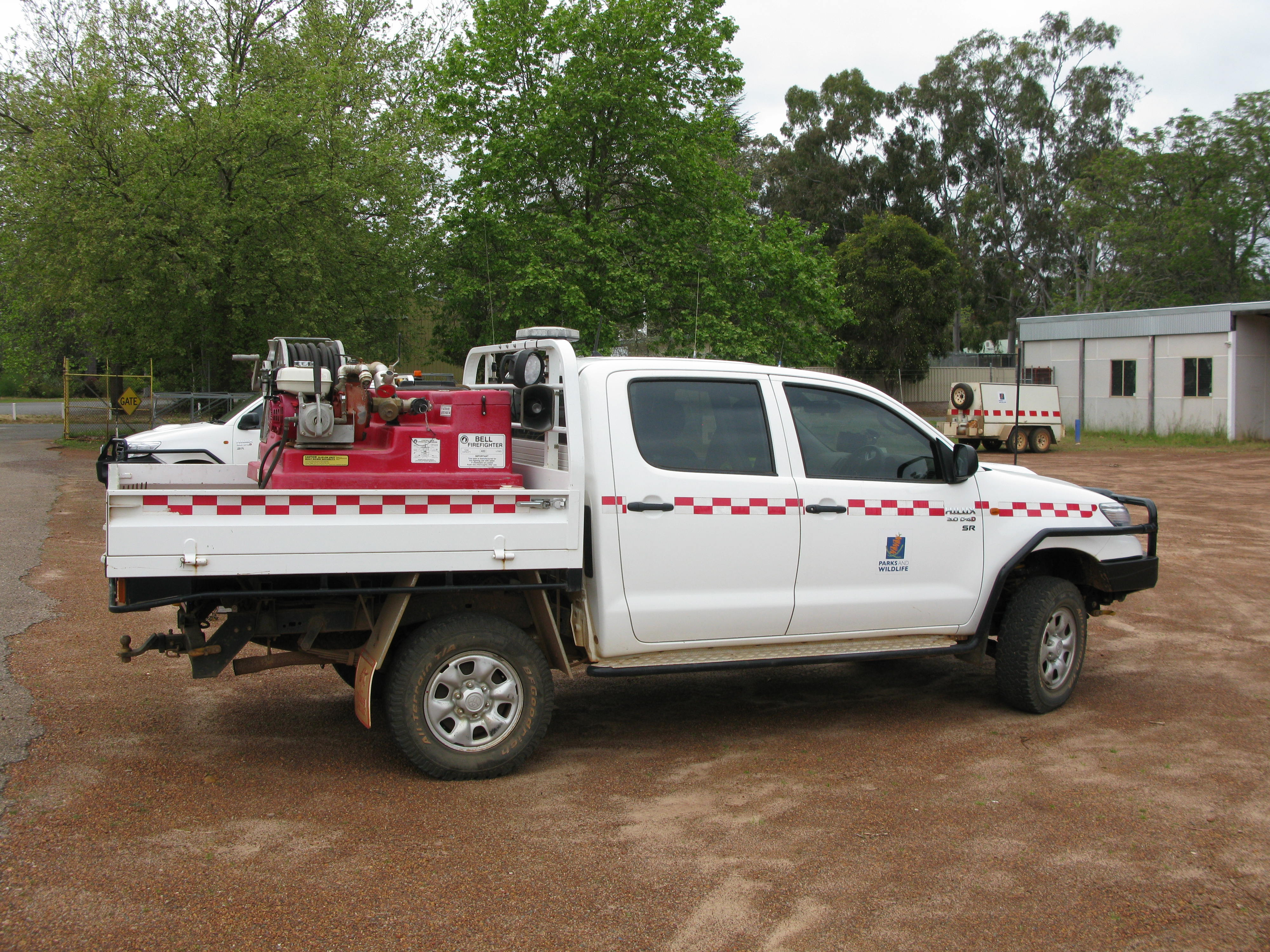
Light patrol (fast attack) Toyota Hilux 3.0 D4D SR at Dwellingup depot in October 2014.

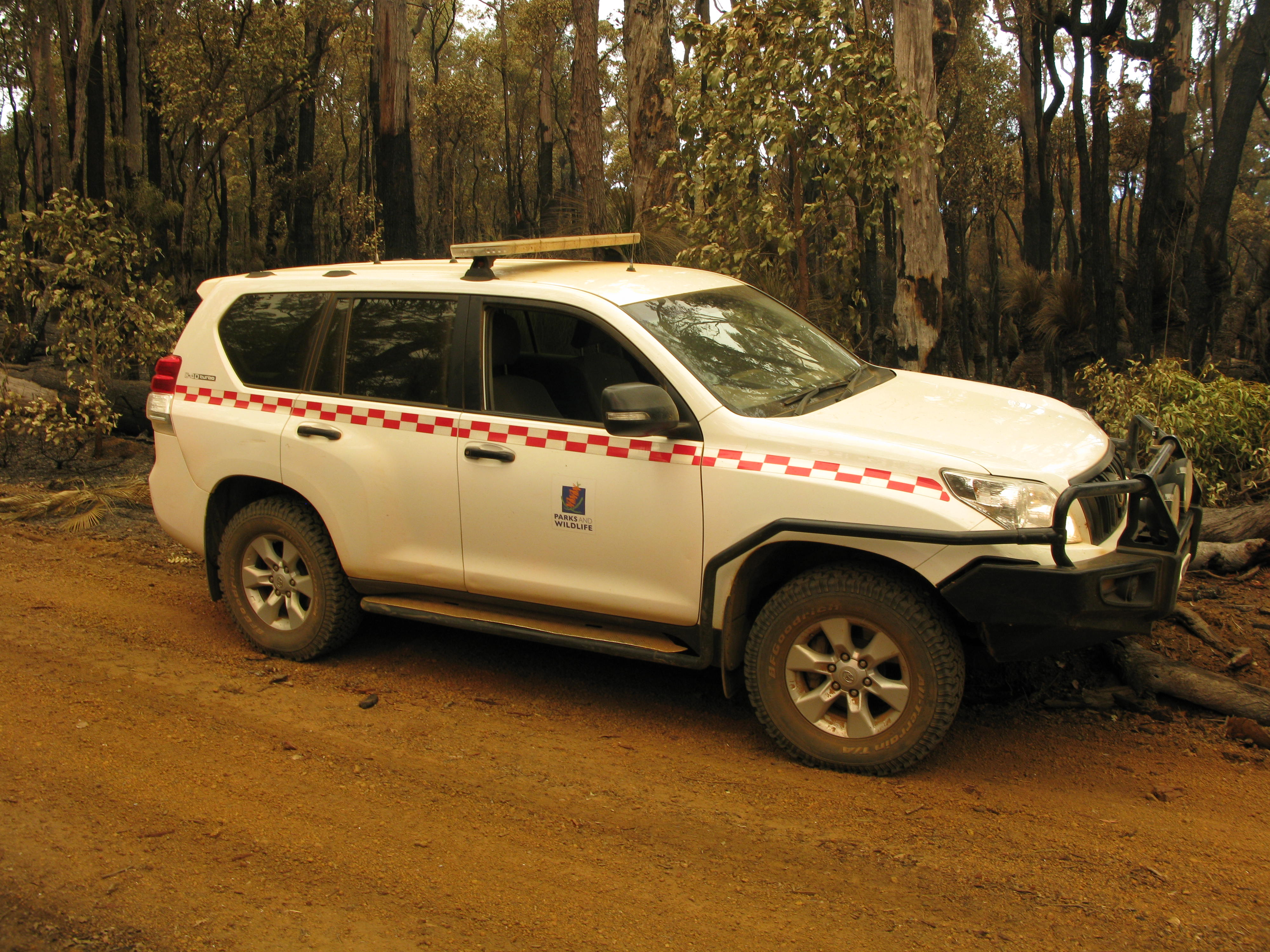
4WD vehicle (used by a sector commander) Toyota Land Cruiser, Perth Hills, October 2014.

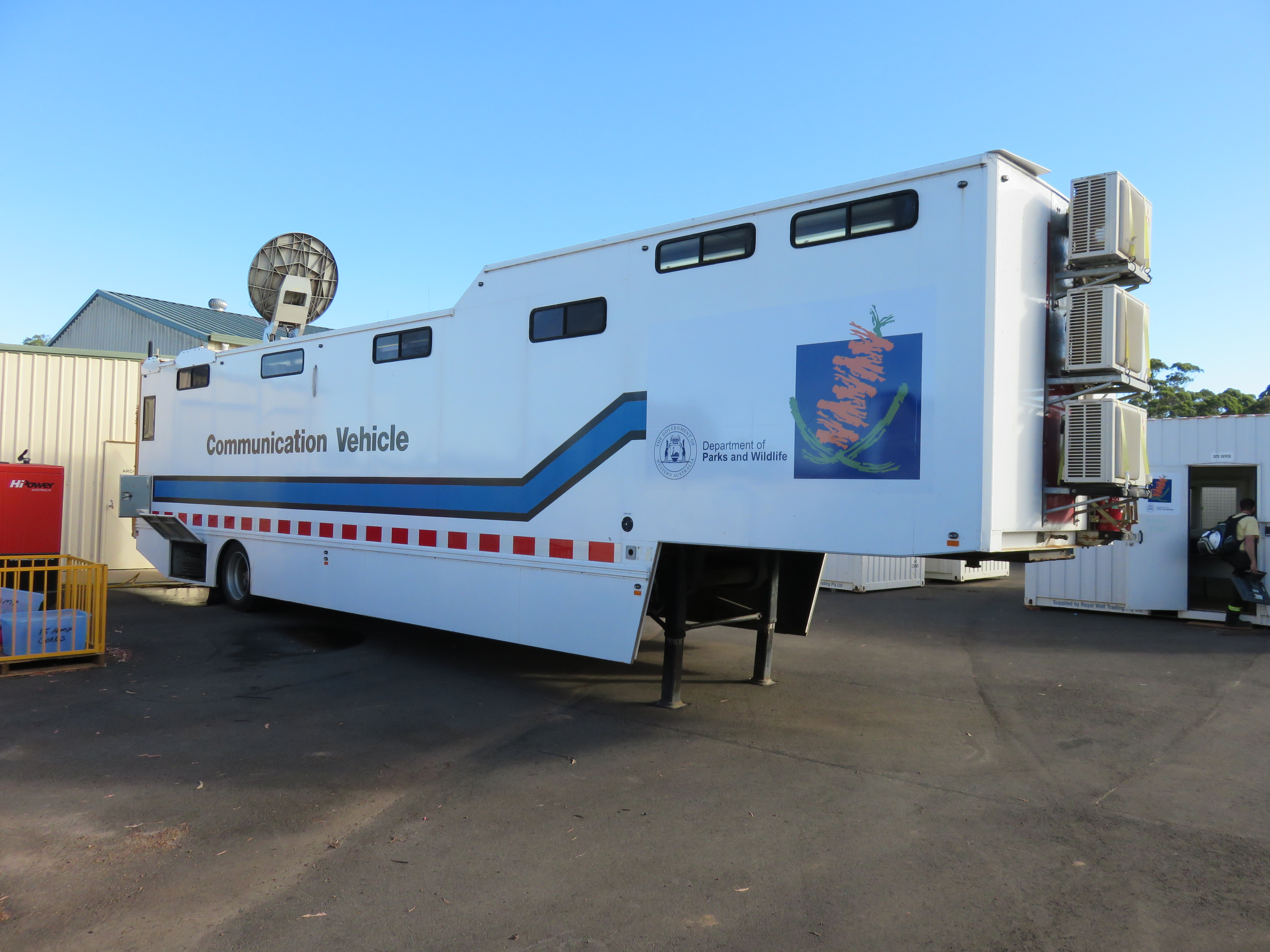
Pantech communication vehicle at Pemberton depot during DON019 O'Sullivan bushfire in February 2015.

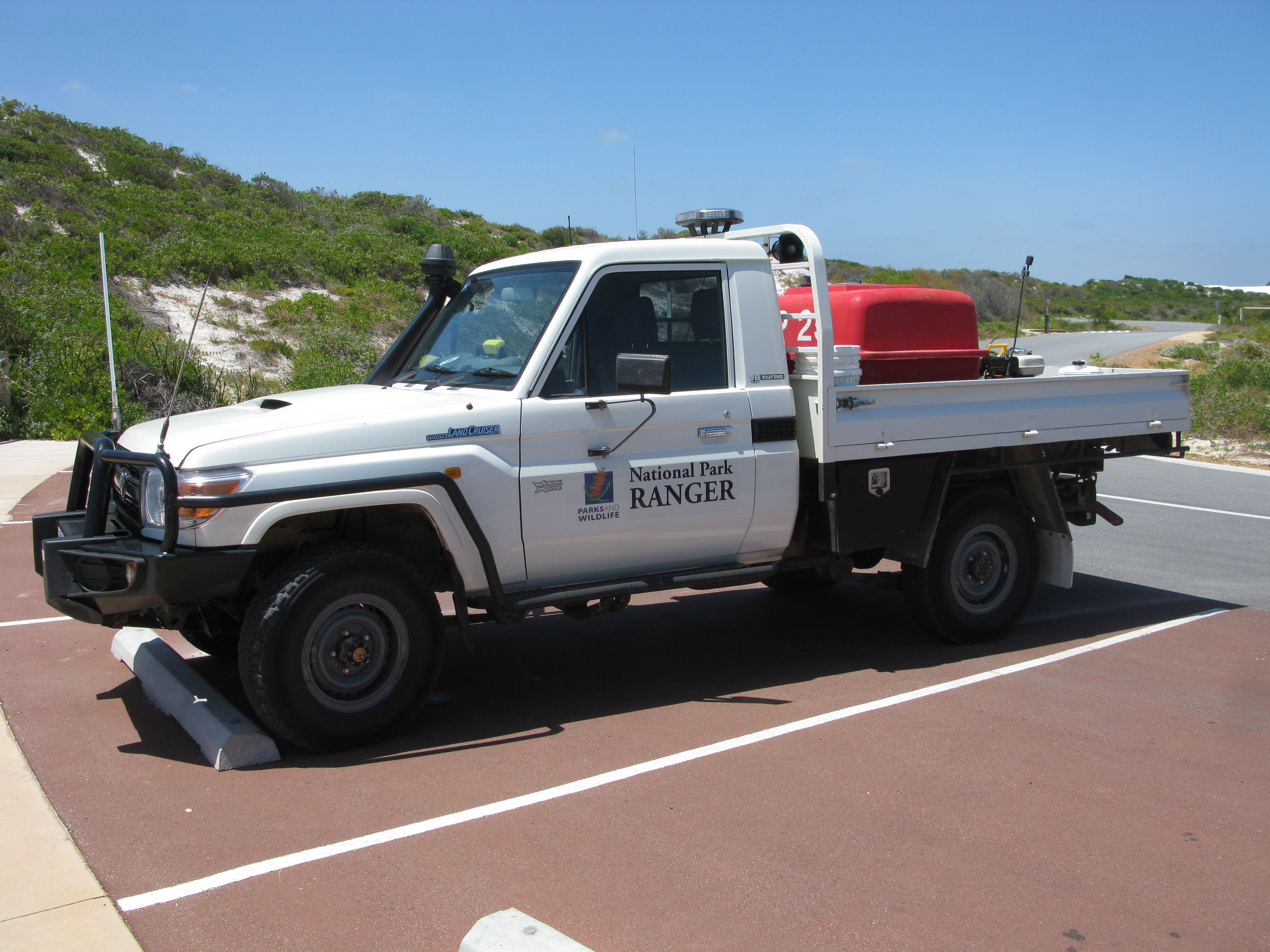
National park ranger light patrol in Toyota Landcruiser V8D4D Turbo Work Mate at Nambung National Park in October 2013.

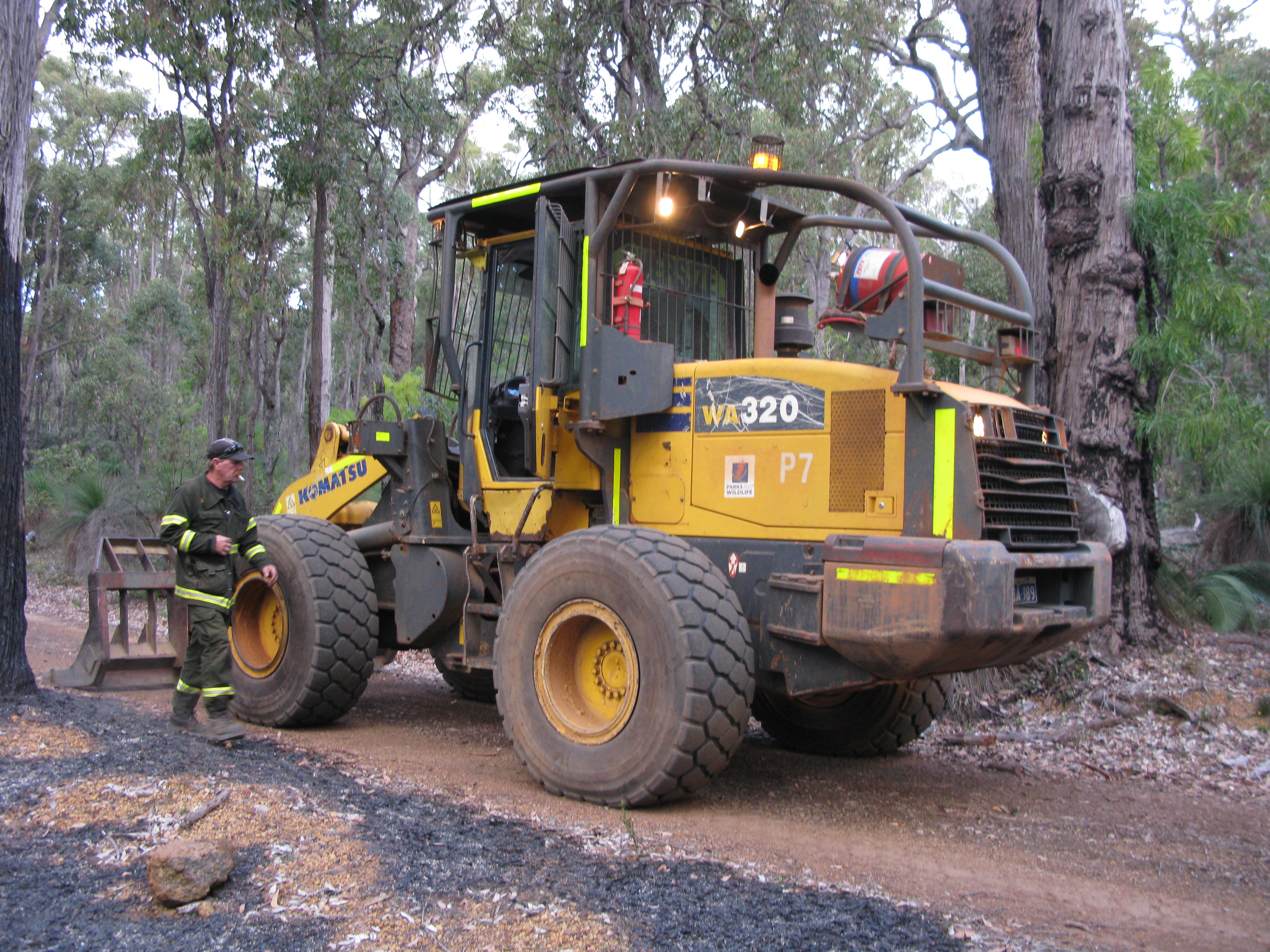
Komatsu WA320 front end loader (plant P7) in Perth Hills for a prescribed fire in October 2014.

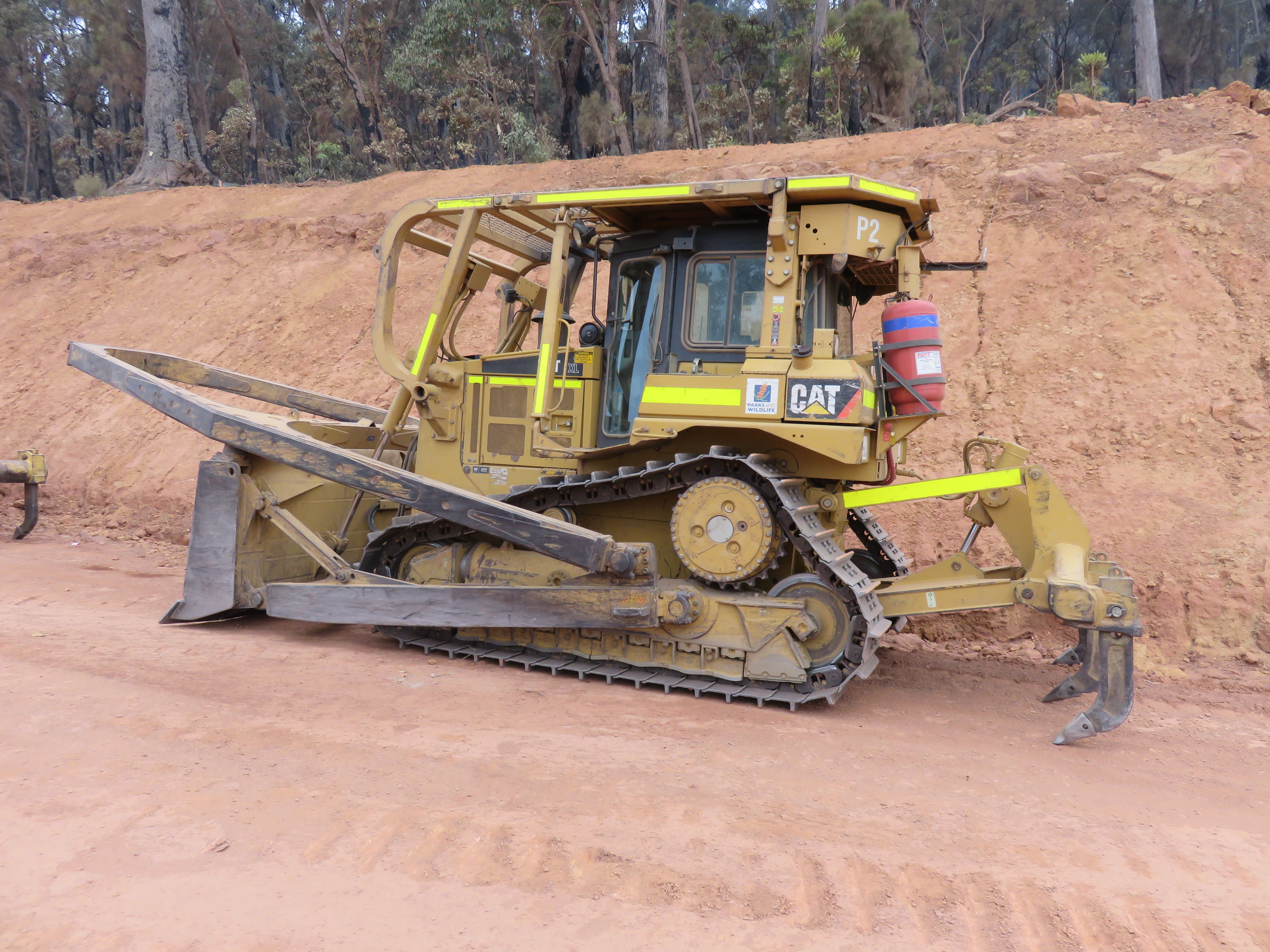
Caterpillar D6 dozer (plant P2) at Mount Solus group bushfire in November 2015.

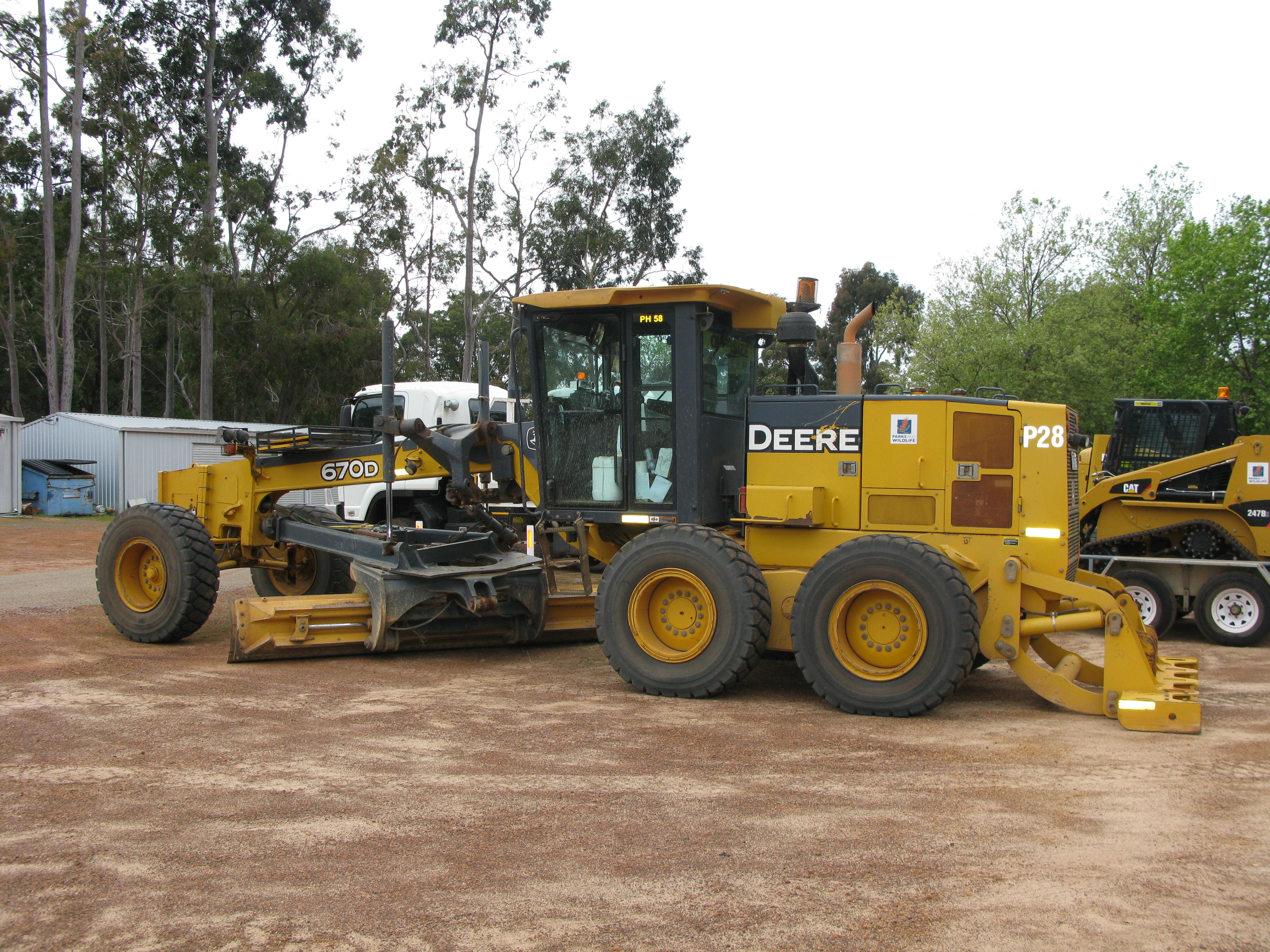
Deere 670D grader (plant P28) at Dwellingup depot in October 2014.

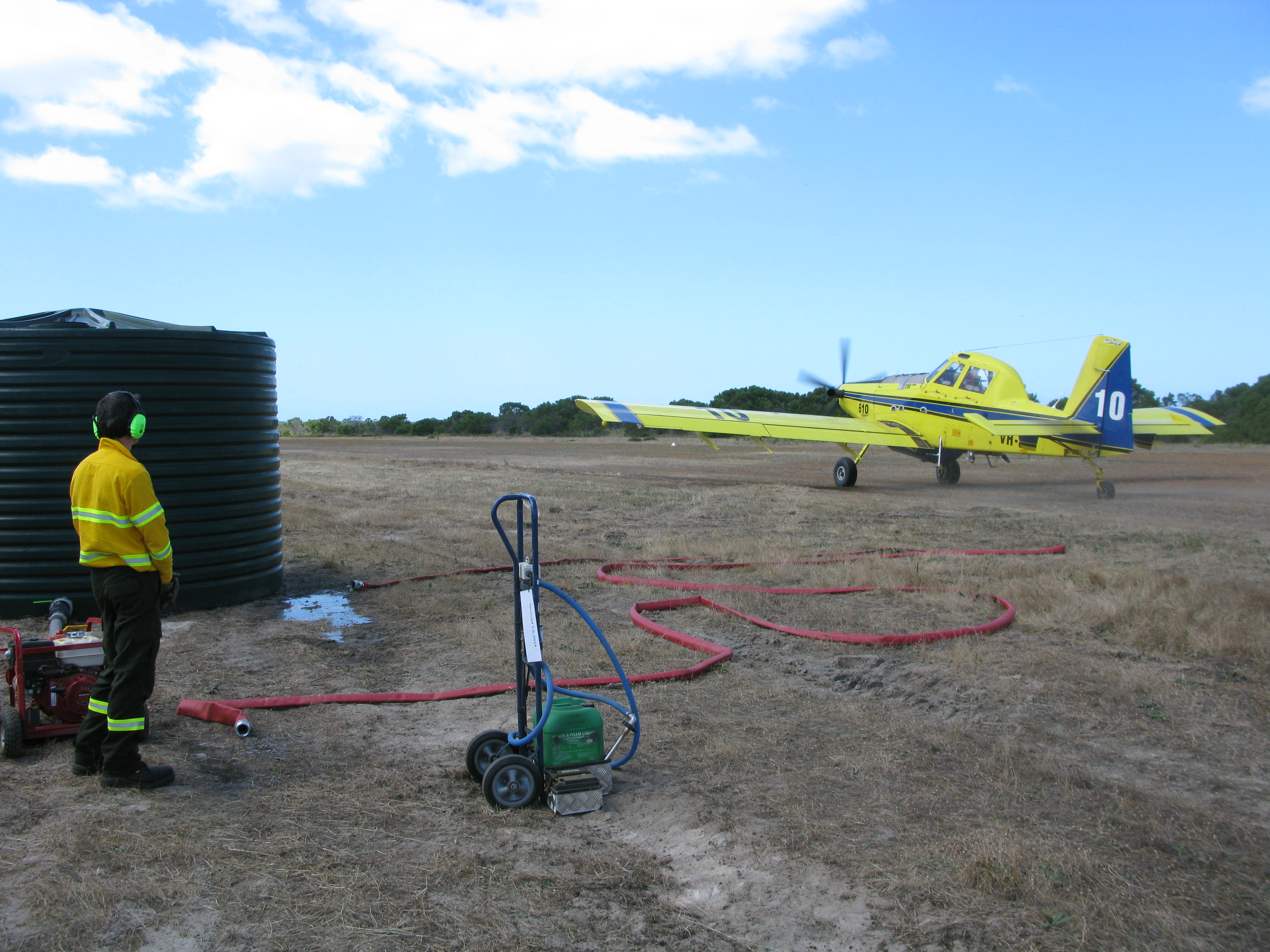
Fire bomber Airtractor 802 being reloaded at Orleans Farm (Tagon) airstrip, close to Cape Arid National Park, Esperance, November 2014.

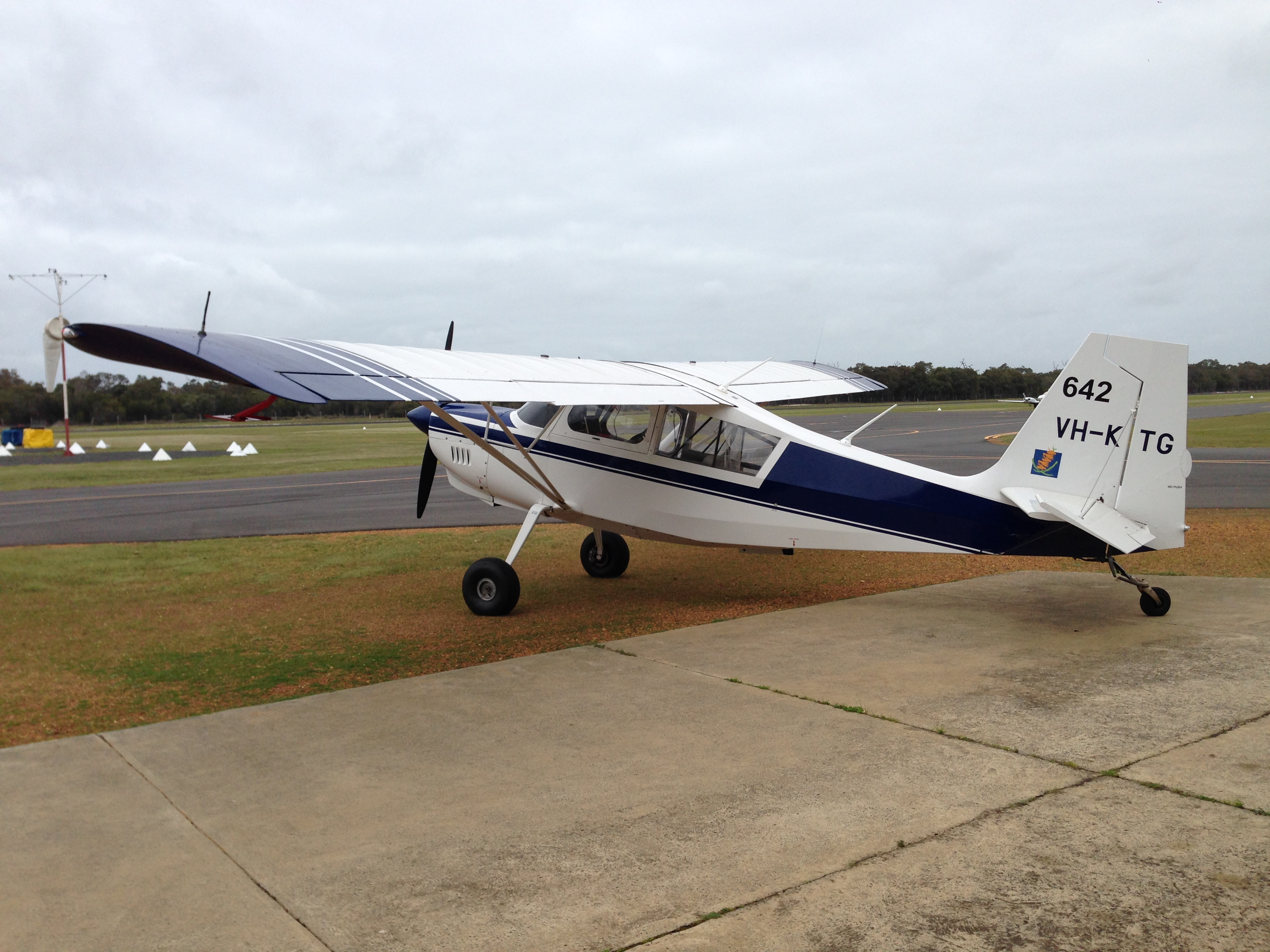
American Scout Champion Aircraft 8GCBC (spotter 642) at Bunbury airport, August 2015.

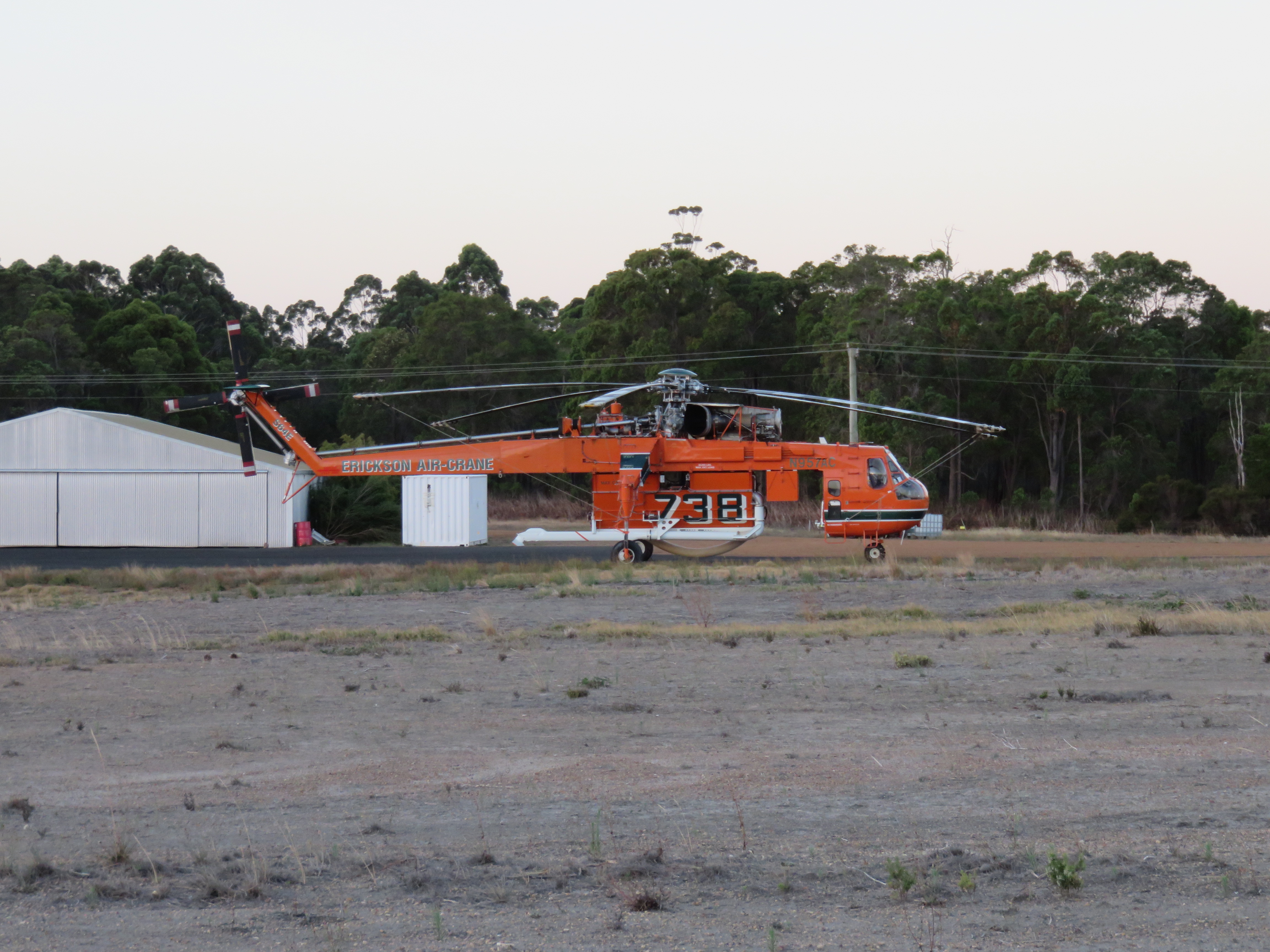
Sikorsky S-64 Aircrane Erickson Inc. Helicopter during O'Sullivan bushfire, Manjimup airport, February 2015.

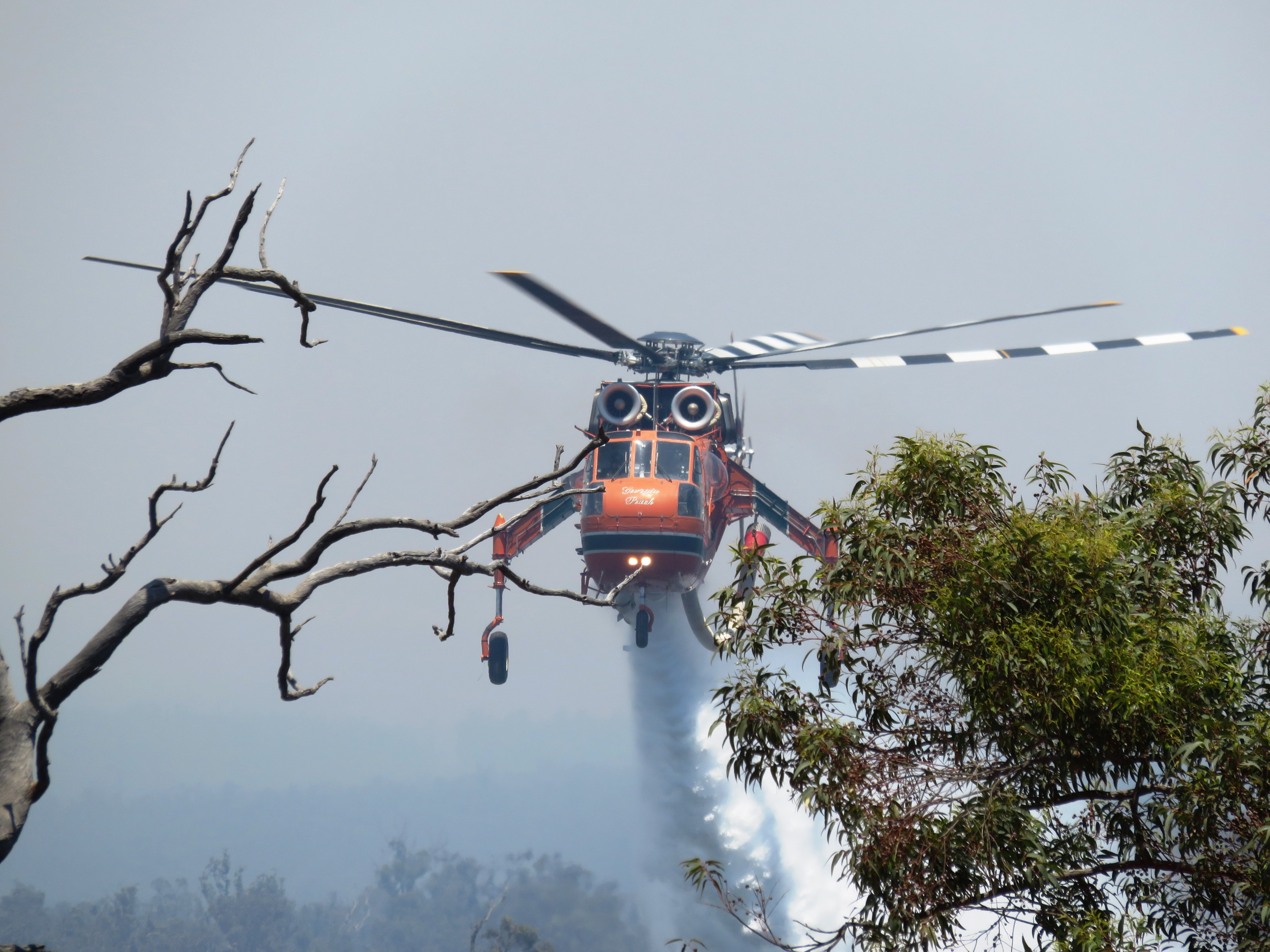
Sikorsky S-64 Aircrane Erickson Inc. Helicopter during Mount Solus group bushfire, Perth Hills, November 2015.

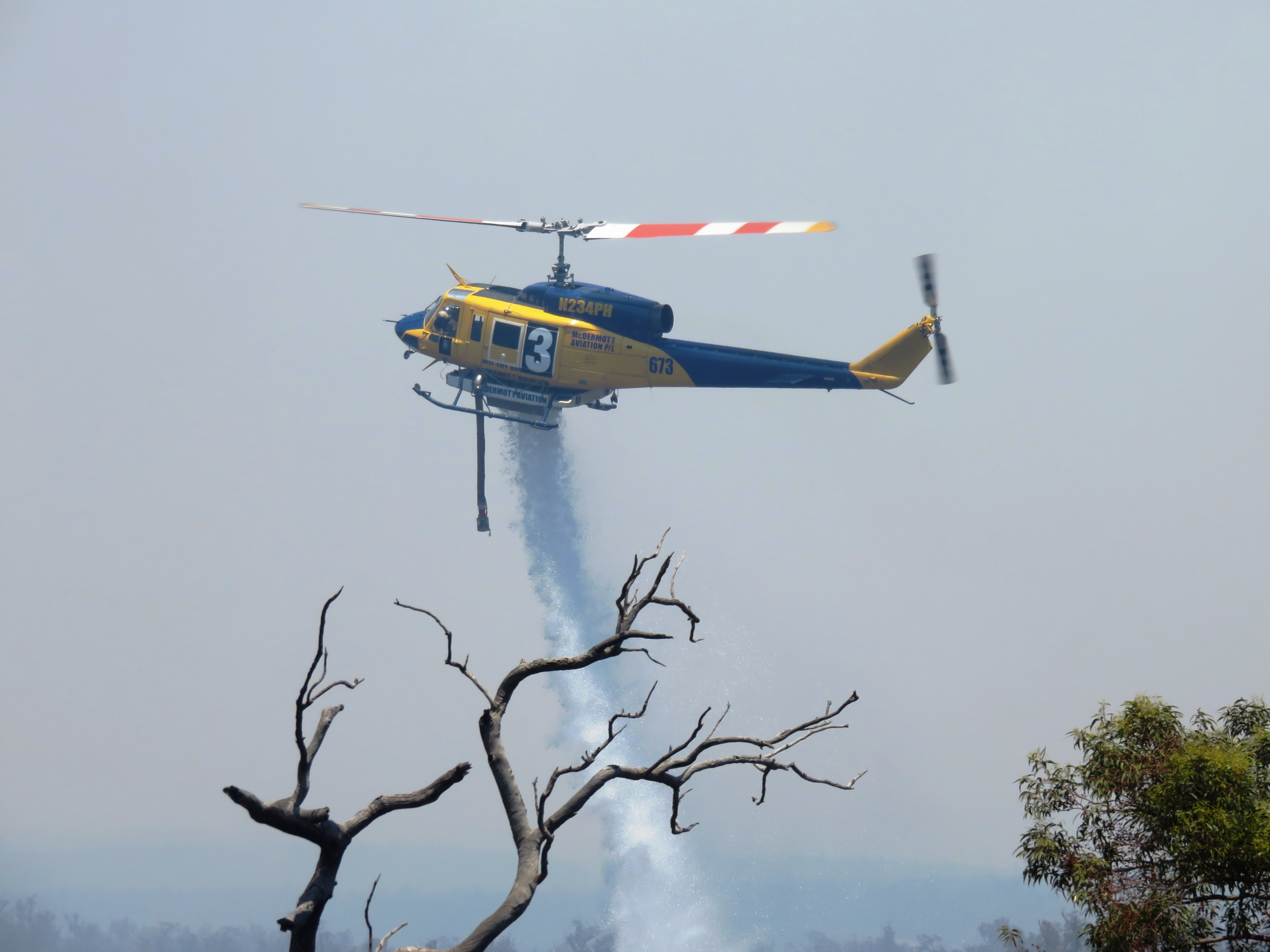
Bell 412EP Helitaks water bomber during Mount Solus group bushfire, Perth Hills, November 2015.

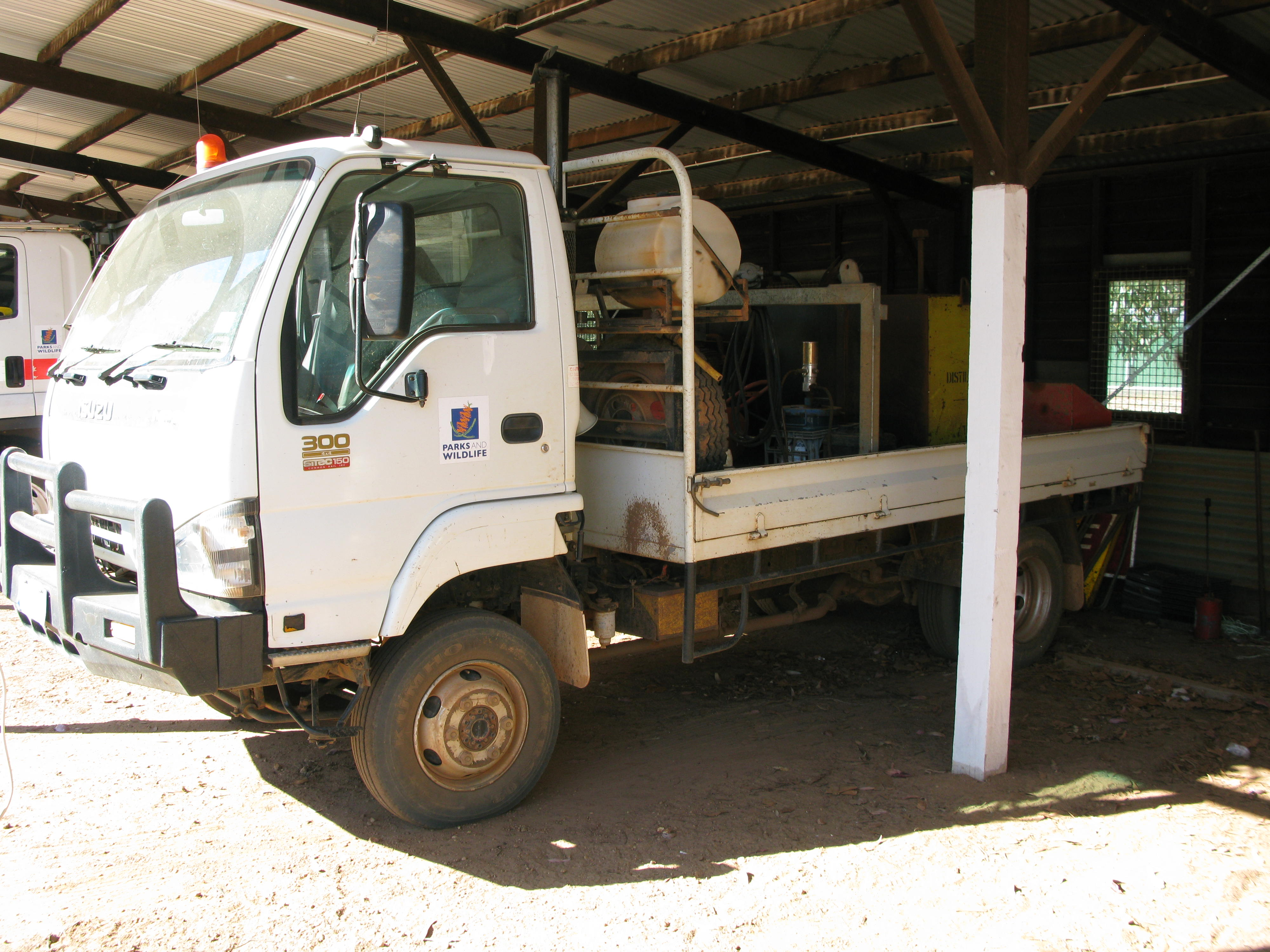
Izusu 300 4WD tender at Dwellingup depot, October 2014.

== Uniforms and equipment ==
The Department of Parks and Wildlife had three types of uniforms:

- a standard khaki and bottle green uniform with appropriate badging was supplied to and worn by staff whose duties included the monitoring of legislative compliance (National Park and Marine Rangers, Conservation and Land Management Officers, Forest Officers, Wildlife Officers and Authorised CALM Officers under Bush Fire Act),
- a work wear (khaki and bottle green only with generic badge) for those that worked in the field and personal protective equipment or clothing (TecaSafe gold overshirt, TecaSafe dark green trousers and vest, Kevlar helmet with goggles, gloves, belt and fire boots) for staff who were involved in fire management activities,
- a corporate apparel worn by employees who were in regular contact with the public or members of other departments (sand, grey or white shirt, black trousers).
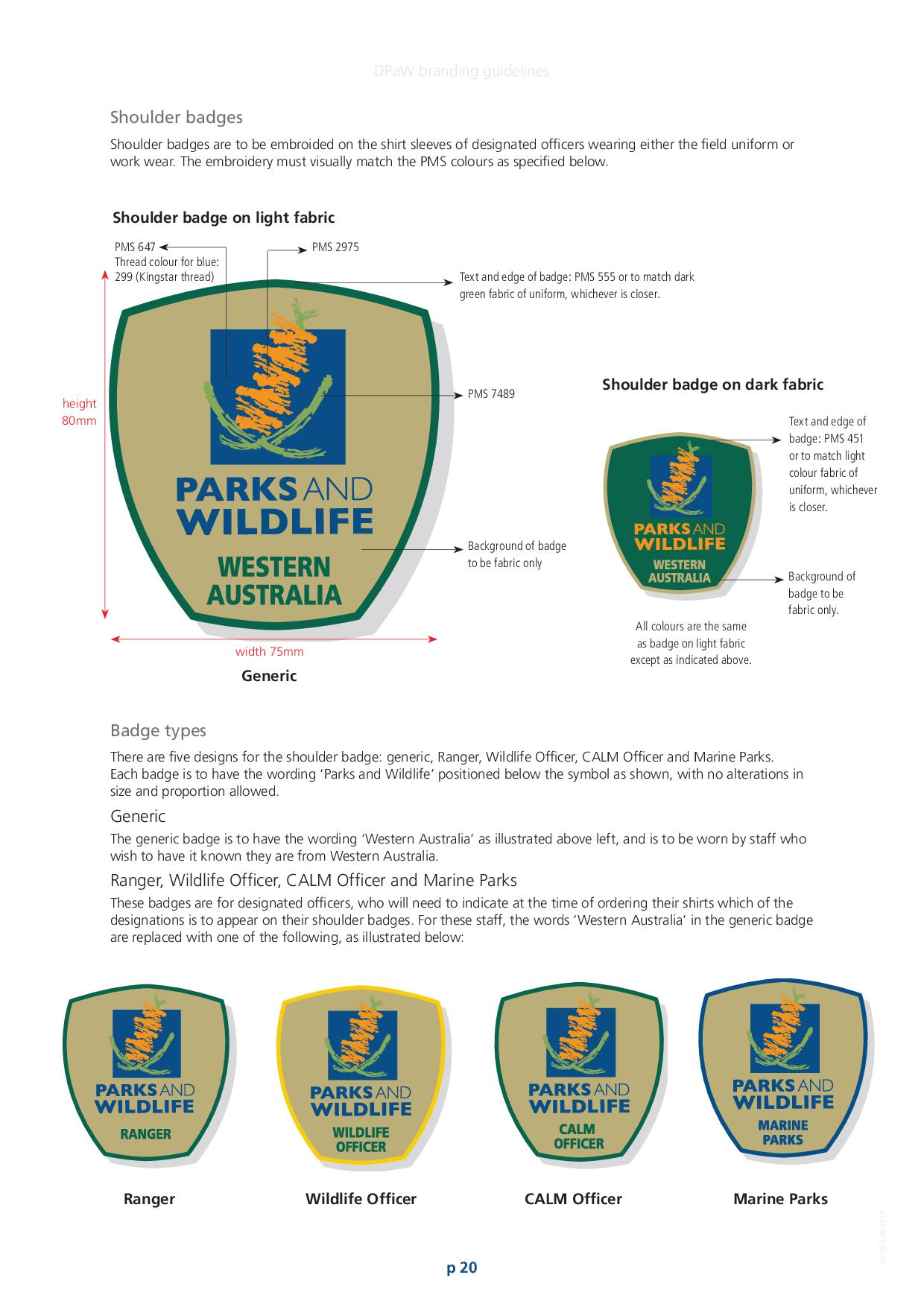
Western Australian Department of Parks and Wildlife shoulder's badges, 2013.

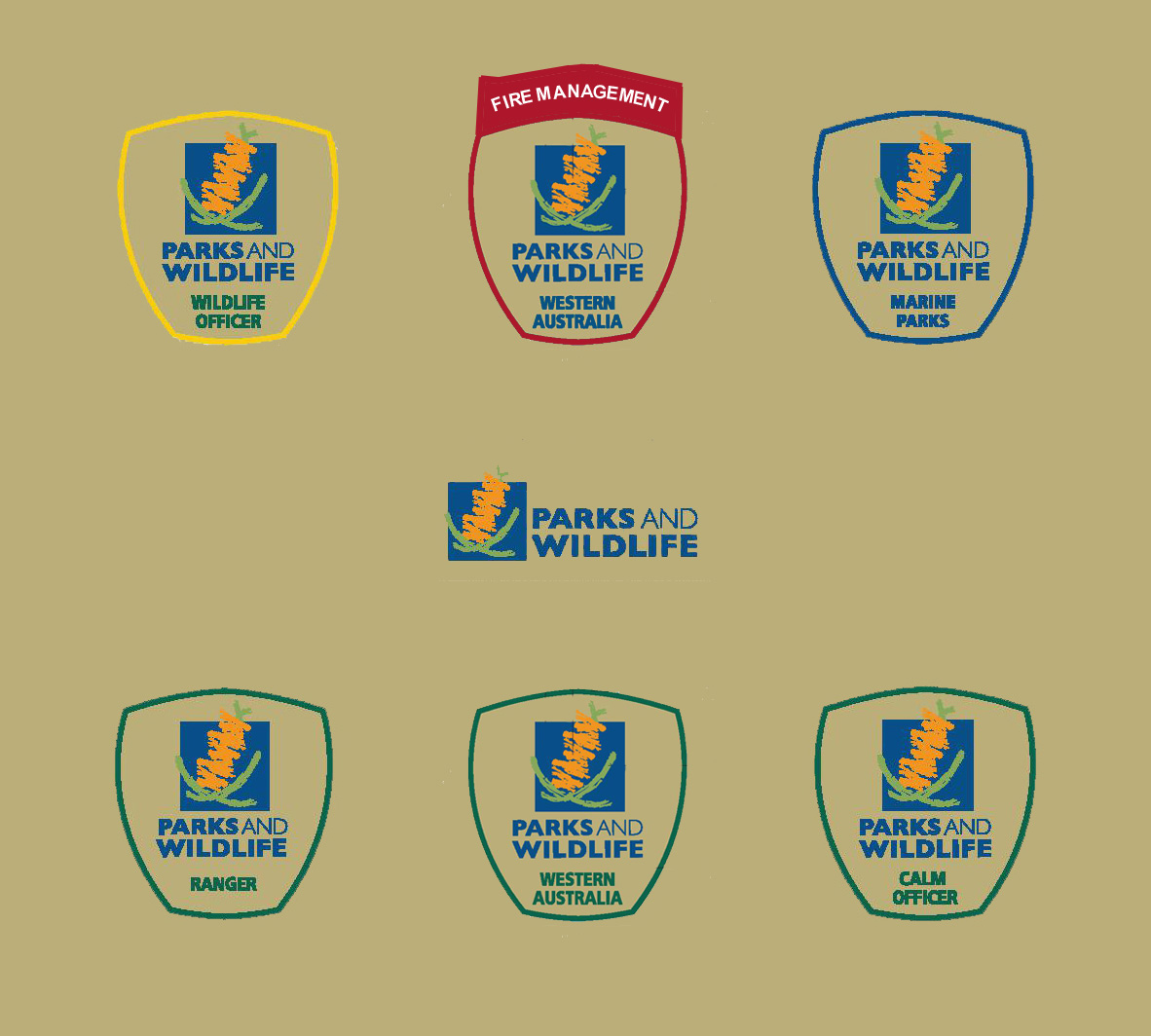
Western Australian Department of Parks and Wildlife shoulder's badges, 2015.

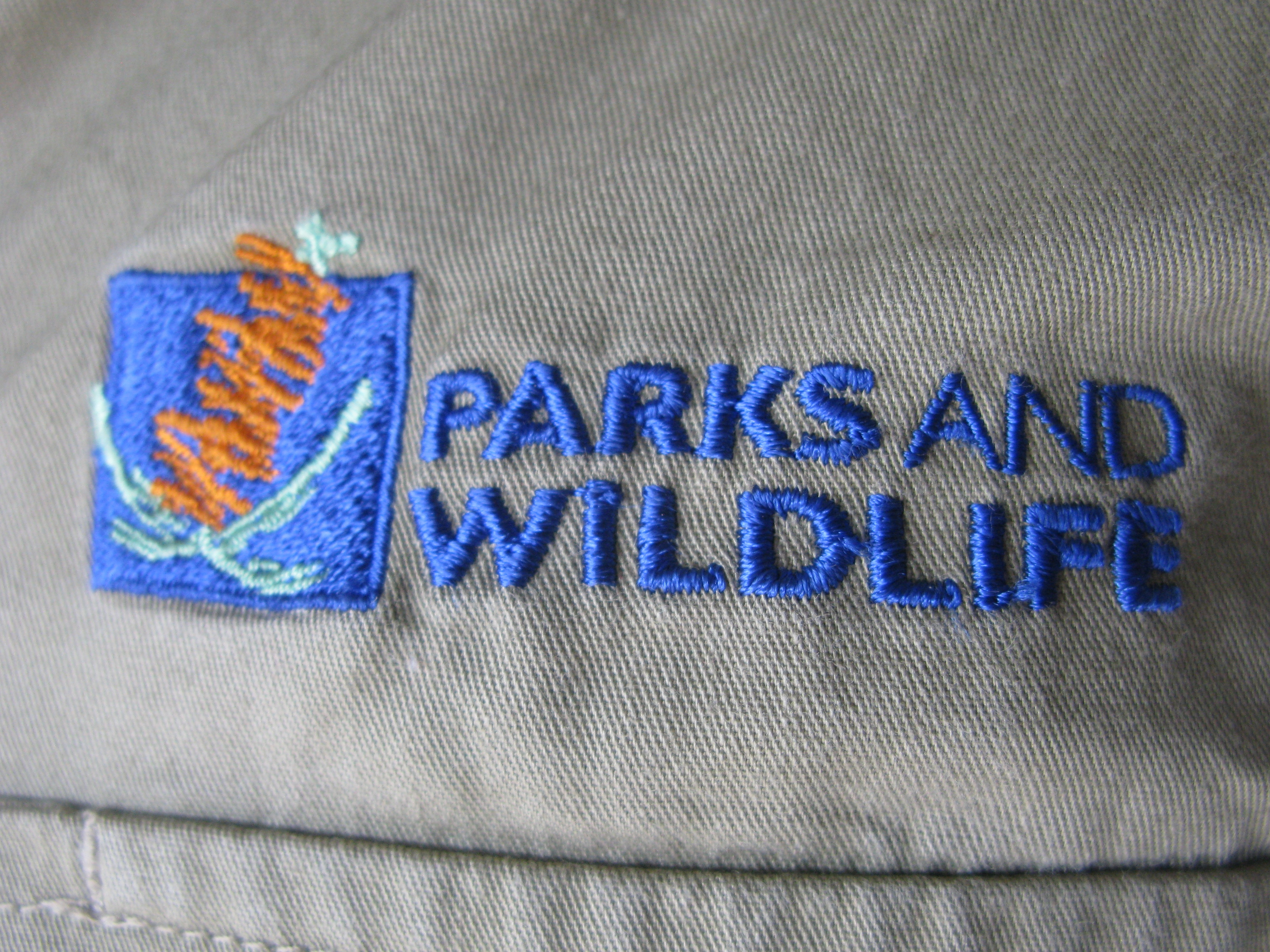
Department of Parks and Wildlife's logo positioned above the left pocket on all corporate apparels, 2013.

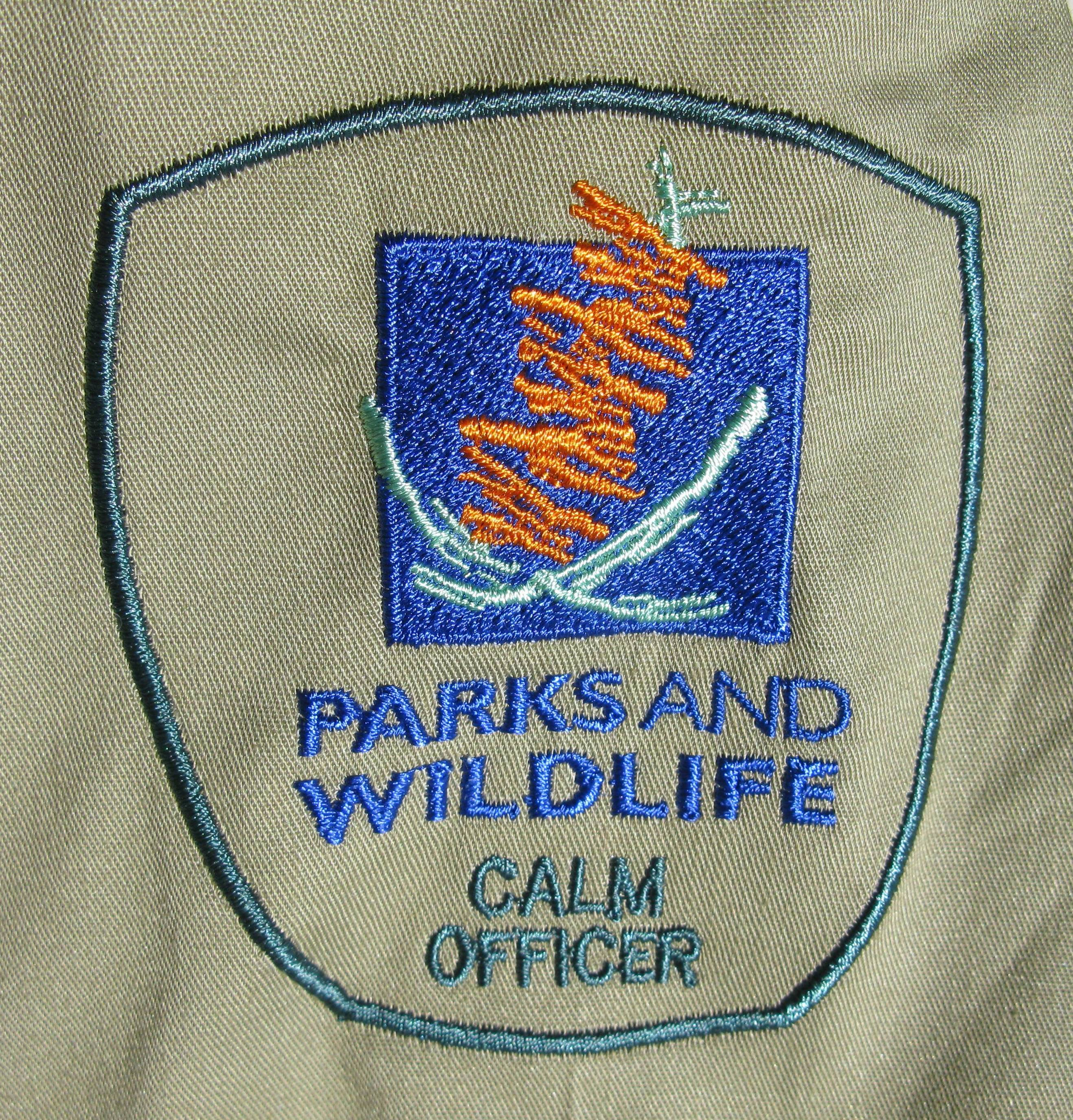
Conservation and Land Management Officer under CALM Act 1984 shoulder badge for uniform shirt, 2013.

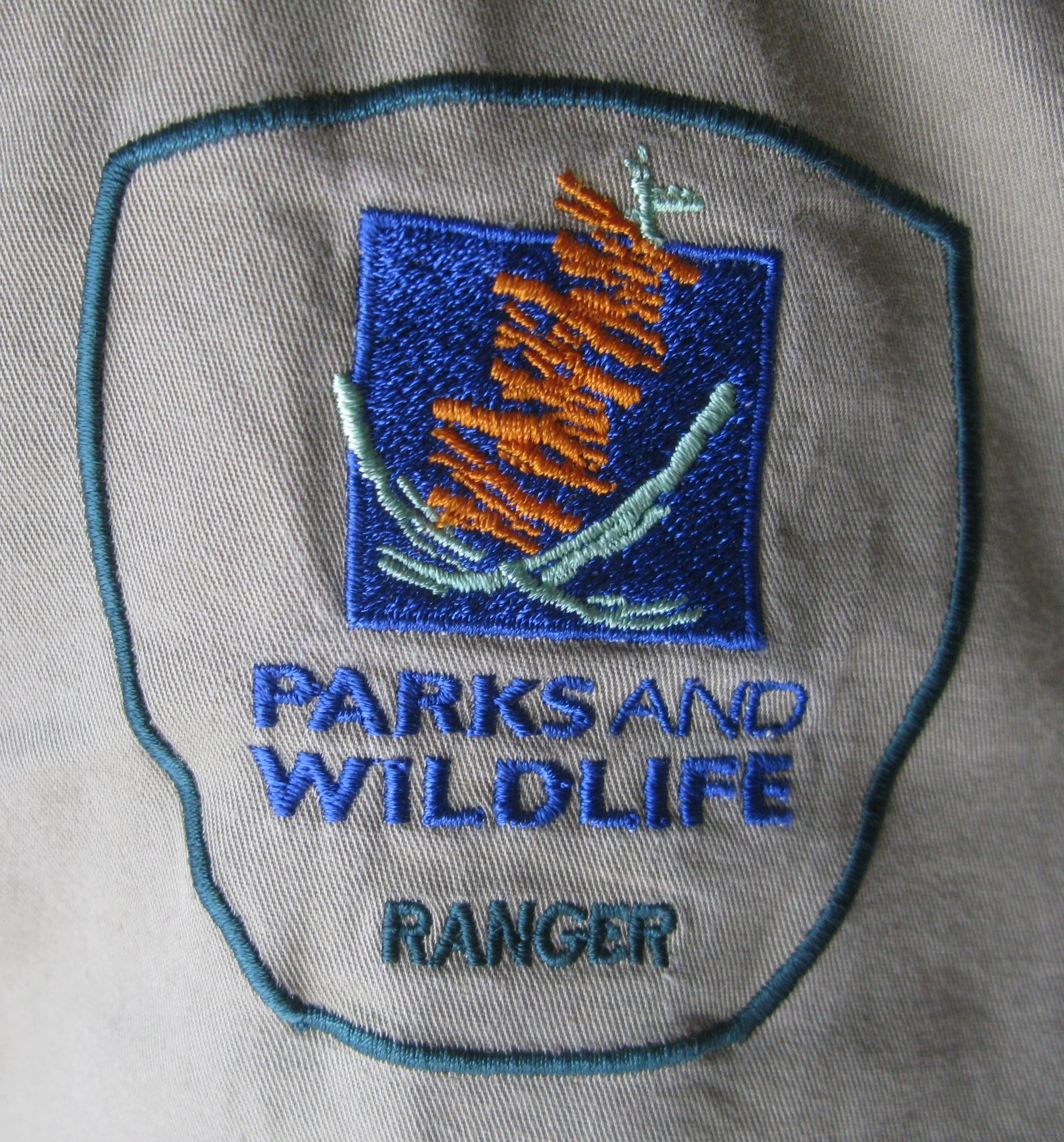
National Park Ranger under CALM Act 1984 shoulder badge for uniform shirt, 2013.

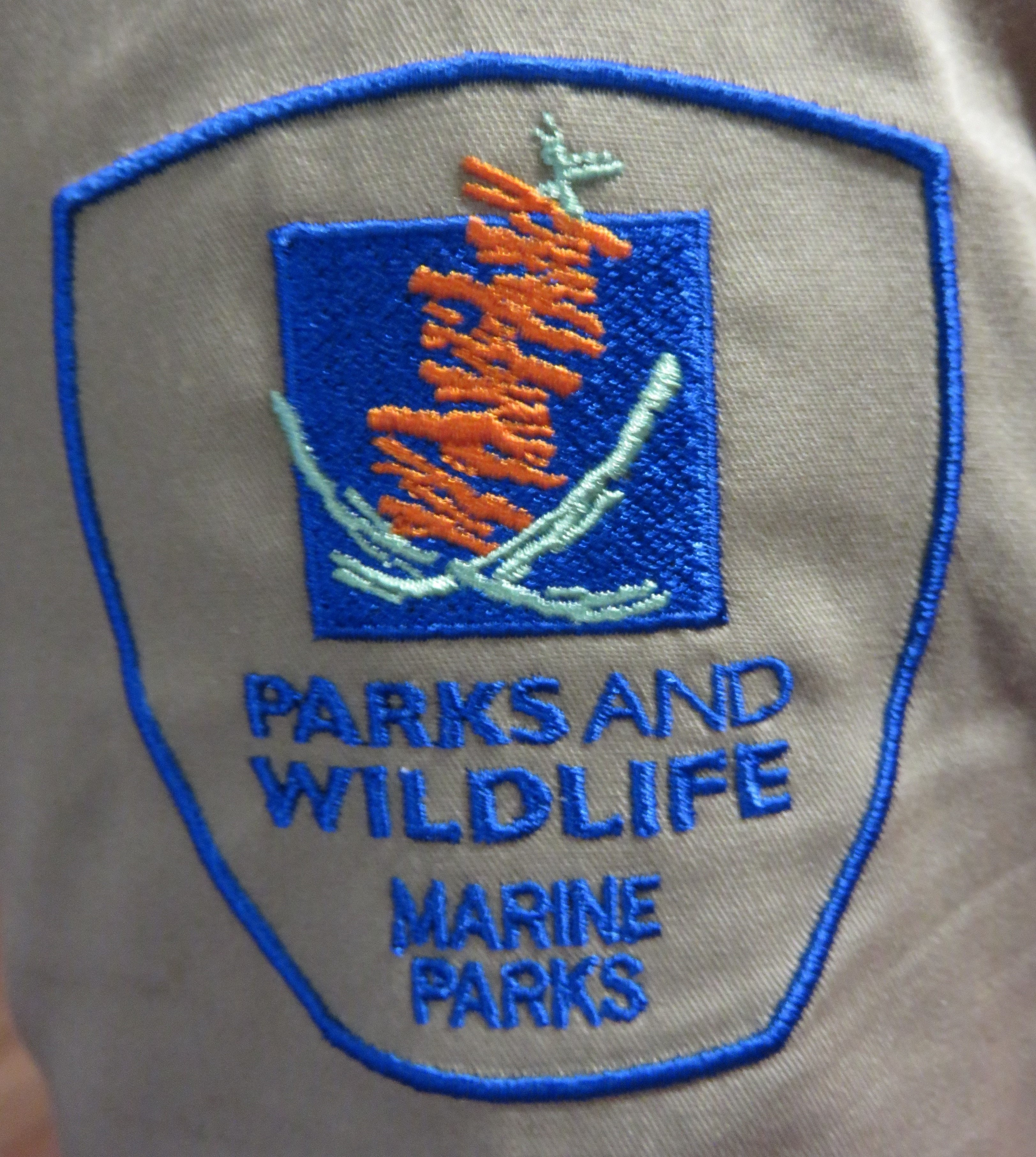
Marine Ranger and Officer shoulder badge for uniform shirt, 2013.

Conservation and Land Management Officer under CALM Act 1984 (with Bushfire Act 1954 powers) shoulder badge for uniform shirt, 2015.

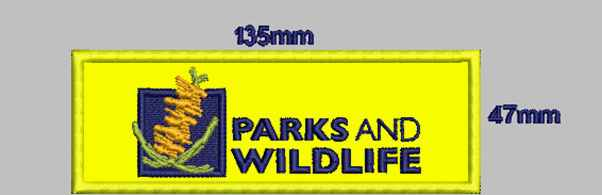
Western Australian Department of Parks and Wildlife Fire Personal Protective Clothing chest badge, 2014.

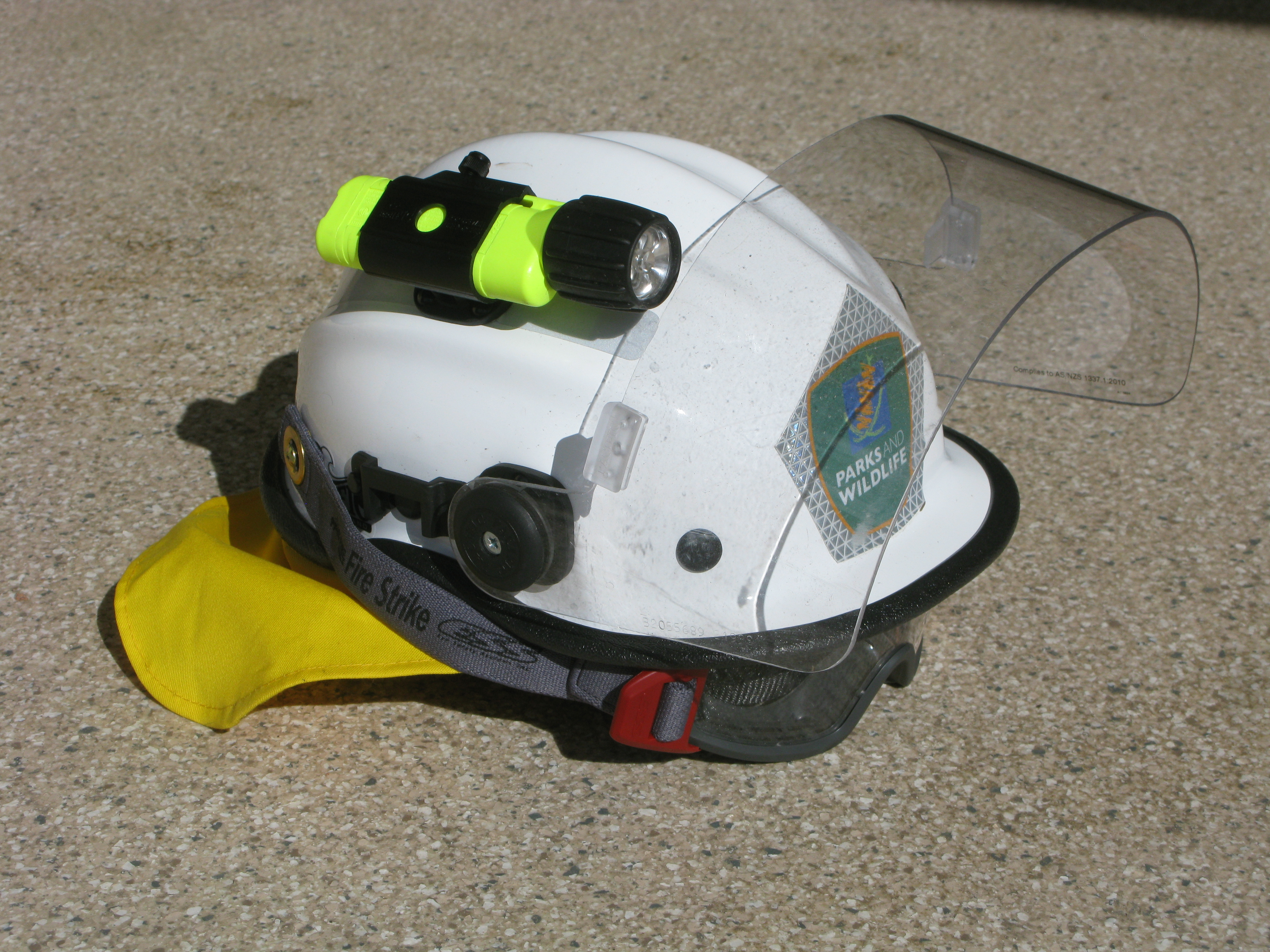
Bush Fire Kevlar helmet Bush Ranger 9 (Pacific) used for bushfires and prescribed burns, Department of Parks and Wildlife, 2014.

== See also ==
- NSW National Parks & Wildlife Service
- Parks Victoria
- Queensland Parks and Wildlife Service
- Tasmania Parks and Wildlife Service
- National Parks and Wildlife Service South Australia
- Parks and Wildlife Commission of the Northern Territory
