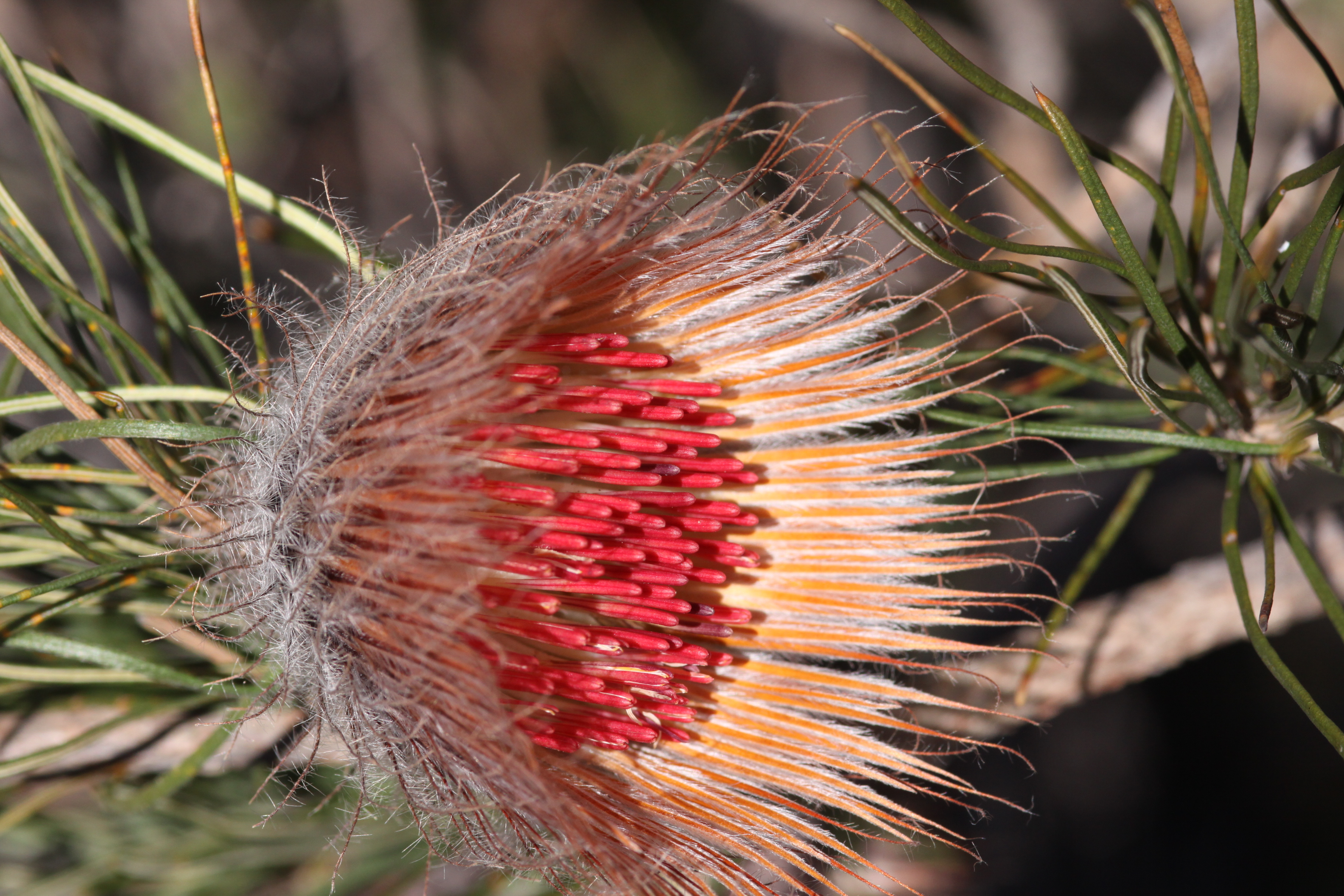
- Banksia splendida at Tathra National Park, Western Australia

Conservation status
- Endangered (IUCN 3.1)

Scientific classification
- Kingdom: Plantae
- Clade: Tracheophytes
- Clade: Angiosperms
- Clade: Eudicots
- Order: Proteales
- Family: Proteaceae
- Genus: Banksia
- Subgenus: Banksia subg. Banksia
- Series: Banksia ser. Dryandra
- Species: B. splendida

Binomial name
- Banksia splendida A.R.Mast and K.R.Thiele

Synonyms
- Dryandra speciosa Meisn.; Josephia speciosa (Meisn. Kuntze

= Banksia splendida =

Shaggy dryandra

Species of shrub native to Western Australia

Banksia splendida, commonly known as shaggy dryandra, is a species of shrub that is endemic to the southwest of Western Australia. It has sharply-pointed linear leaves that are woolly on the lower surface, cream-coloured and maroon or yellow flowers in heads of between 65 and 115, and later up to eight egg-shaped follicles in each head.

== Description ==
Banksia splendida is a much-branched shrub that typically grows to a height of 2 m (6 ft 7 in) but does not form a lignotuber. It has sharply-pointed, linear leaves that are 50–100 mm (2.0–3.9 in) long and 1–1.5 mm (0.039–0.059 in) wide on a petiole 2–5 mm (0.079–0.197 in) long. The edges of the leaves are rolled under and the lower surface in woolly-hairy. The flowers are arranged in a head of between 65 and 115 with linear, tapering and thread-like involucral bracts 40–50 mm (1.6–2.0 in) long at the base of the head. The perianth is cream-coloured near its base, maroon or yellow above, 24–30 mm (0.94–1.18 in) long and the pistil is cream-coloured, 23–29 mm (0.91–1.14 in) long with a pale red pollen-presenter. Flowering occurs from July to September and the fruit is an egg-shaped follicle 18–25 mm (0.71–0.98 in) long.

== Taxonomy ==
This species was first collected by James Drummond in the late 1840s, and sent to England in Supplement 19 to his 5th Collection. The first mention of the species occurred in 1852, when Meissner published "A list of the Proteaceae collected in south-western Australia by Mr. James Drummond" in Hooker's Journal of Botany and Kew Garden Miscellany. This list includes an entry for this specimen under the name "Dryandra speciosa Meisn. MSS.". Four years later, Meissner formally published this name in his chapter on the Proteaceae in de Candolle's Prodromus systematis naturalis regni vegetabilis. No etymology was given for the specific epithet, but it is accepted that it comes from the Latin speciosus ("showy"), and refers to the attractive inflorescences; if so then this is somewhat inappropriate since the flowers tend to be obscured by foliage.

Meissner placed D. speciosa in D. sect. Eudryandra on the grounds that it contained a single seed separator, and erected for it a new series (Haplophyllae) of unstated rank, because it has Folia omniæ integerrima ("All the leaves have completely smooth margins"). Meissner's arrangement differed from George Bentham's 1870 arrangement in Flora Australiensis and was based solely on floral characters and disregarded leaf shape. Bentham retained D. speciosa in D. sect. Eudryandra, but placed it in a new series Gymnocephalae with D. Shuttleworthiana (now B. shuttleworthiana (bearded dryandra)) and D. tridentata (now B. tridentata (yellow honeypot).

Bentham's arrangement stood until 1996, when Alex George published a revision of the genus in the journal Nuytsia. Dryandra sect. Eudryandra was discarded as invalid, and replaced by the autonym at subgenus rank, D. subg. Dryandra. Dryandra speciosa was retained in this subgenus, and in D. ser. Gymnocephalae, despite the latter having a significantly different circumscription in George's arrangement.

In the same journal, George described two subspecies of D. speciosa:

- Dryandra speciosa subsp. speciosa that has between 85 and 115 flowers in each head and follicles 18–21 mm (0.71–0.83 in) long;
- Dryandra speciosa subsp. macrocarpa that has between 65 and 75 flowers in each head and follicles 24–25 mm (0.94–0.98 in) long.

Since 1998, Austin Mast has been publishing results of ongoing cladistic analyses of DNA sequence data for the subtribe Banksiinae. His analyses have provided evidence of the paraphyly of Banksia with respect to Dryandra. Early in 2007, Mast and Kevin Thiele initiated a rearrangement of Banksia by merging Dryandra into it.

As there was already a plant named Banksia speciosa (showy banksia), Mast and Thiele had to choose a new specific epithet for D. speciosa; their choice, splendida, is from the Latin splendidus ("brilliant"), in reference to the attractive inflorescences. No infrageneric arrangement has been proffered in replacement for the arrangement of George's now set aside. Mast and Thiele have foreshadowed publishing a full arrangement once DNA sampling of Dryandra is complete. The subspecies names splendida and macrocarpa are accepted by the Australian Plant Census.

== Distribution and habitat ==
The two subspecies of shaggy dryandra grow in kwongan and occur in two disjunct areas. Subspecies splendida is found near Tammin and subsp. macrocarpa occurs between the Tathra National Park and Badgingarra.

== Conservation status ==
Banksia splendida subsp. splendida is classified as priority two by the Government of Western Australia Department of Parks and Wildlife meaning that it is poorly known and from only one or a few locations and subsp. macrocarpa is classified as priority three meaning that it is poorly known and known from only a few locations but is not under imminent threat.
