= Tathra National Park =

National park in Western Australia

- IUCN category II (national park)
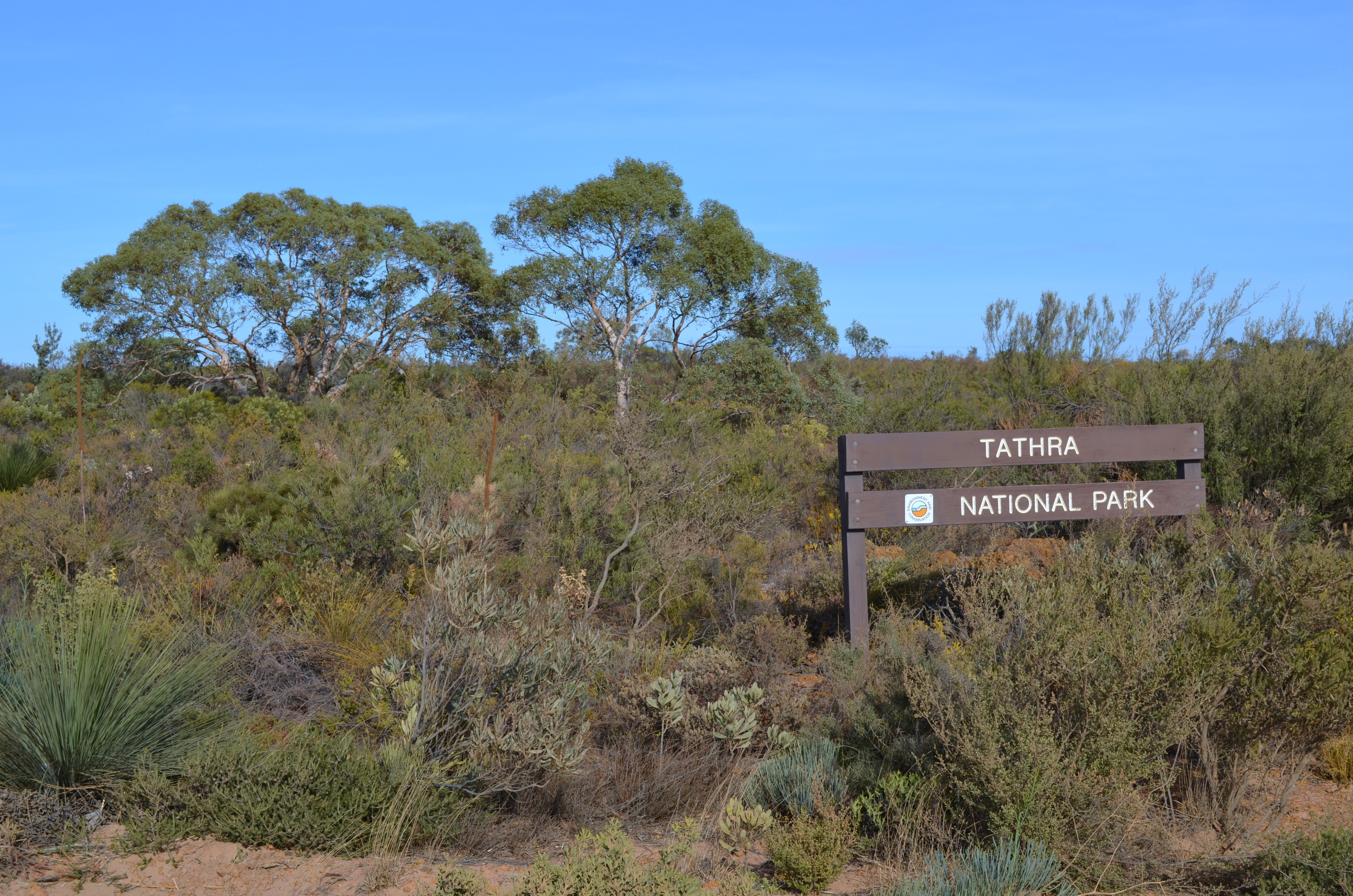
- Sign denoting the northeastern corner of the portion of Tathra National Park south of the Carnamah–Eneabba Road

- Location within Western Australia
- Location: Western Australia
- Nearest city: Eneabba
- Coordinates: 29°46′37″S 115°31′44″E
- Area: 43.22 km^{2} (16.69 sq mi)
- Established: 1970
- Governing body: Department Biodiversity, Conservation and Attractions (Western Australia)
- Website: Official website

Tathra National Park is a national park in Western Australia, located 240 kilometres (149 mi) north of Perth between the towns of Eneabba and Carnamah on Winchester-Eneabba Road. The name is derived from a Noongar word meaning "beautiful place".

== Description ==
The park is set in sandplain country and is surrounded by farmland, having escaped clearing by wheat farmers in the early 20th century. Shallow valleys with sandy floors change to laterite on the slopes and hilltops, and the low heath changes in composition accordingly. The park is considered a representative sample of flora of the area, although includes some unusual plants - including a species of Daviesia notable for its large red flowers, which is known only from the reserve, and shaggy dryandra (Banksia splendida), which is common on some lateritic rises. Public usage of the park was mainly for wildflower observation in winter and spring according to a 1974 report, whose recommendation (which was not followed) would have seen it demoted to a flora and fauna conservation reserve.

== History ==
Land for the national park was set aside by the Department of Lands and Surveys under Reserves ↑26802 and ↑26805 on 23 May 1969, and over 1970 and 1971, the land was classified as an "A" Class reserve, meaning its purpose could not be changed except by an Act of Parliament, and was vested in the National Parks Authority of Western Australia. The park was officially named on 8 October 1971.

== See also ==
- Protected areas of Western Australia
