= Zoological Parks Authority =

Defunct government authority in Western Australia

The Western Australian Zoological Parks Authority was created under the Zoological Parks Authority Act 2001, and under the Minister of Environment for Western Australia. What had previously been the Zoological Gardens Board, on 22 May 2002, became the Zoological Parks Authority.

The predecessor authority to the Zoological Gardens Board had been known as the Acclimatisation Committee of the Zoological and Botanical Gardens (Perth, W.A.).

It was announced on 28 April 2017 that the Department of Parks and Wildlife would merge with the Botanic Gardens and Parks Authority, the Zoological Parks Authority, and the Rottnest Island Authority on 1 July 2017 to form the Department of Biodiversity, Conservation and Attractions.

== See also ==
- Perth Zoo
