= Botanic Gardens and Parks Authority =

Government agency of Western Australia government

The Botanic Gardens and Parks Authority (BGPA) is a Western Australian Government authority charged with the administration of Kings Park and Bold Park.

It was announced on 28 April 2017 that the Department of Parks and Wildlife would merge with the Botanic Gardens and Parks Authority, the Zoological Parks Authority, and the Rottnest Island Authority on 1 July 2017 to form the Department of Biodiversity, Conservation and Attractions.

The earlier stages of administration of Kings Park and other gardens had been by individual autonomous boards.

The Kings Park Board had started in 1896.
