= Forest Products Commission =

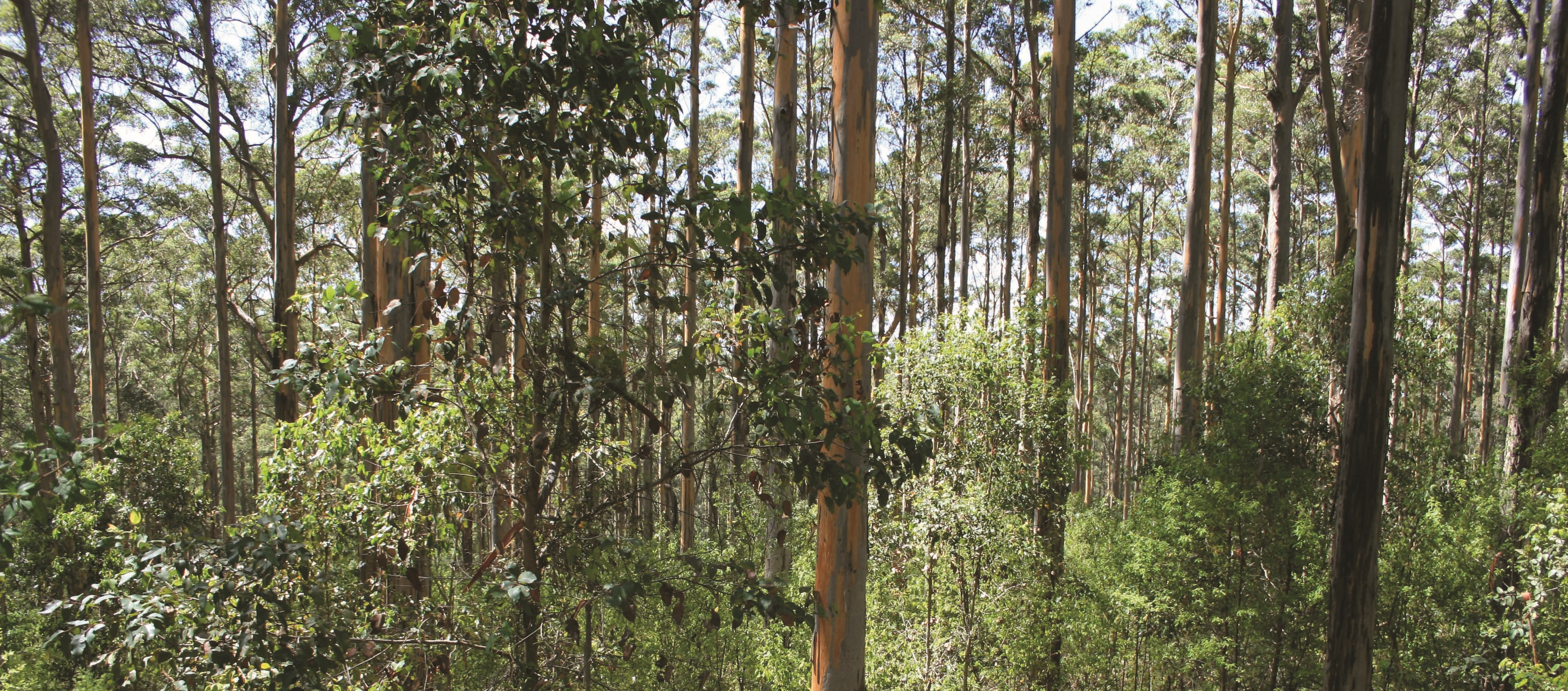
Forest Products Commission A karri forest in Western Australia.

Agency overview
- Formed: 16 November 2000
- Preceding agencies: Forests Department; Department of Conservation and Land Management
- Jurisdiction: Government of Western Australia
- Headquarters: Perth, Western Australia; 31°57′12″S 115°54′51″E
- Employees: 190 (2021)
- Minister responsible: Minister for Forestry
- Agency executives: Stuart West, General Manager; Debra Blaskett, Chair; Melissa Parke, Deputy Chair
- Website: www.fpc.wa.gov.au

The Forest Products Commission (FPC) is a Western Australian Government trading enterprise established under an Act of Parliament, responsible for the development and marketing of the state's renewable timber resources. The agency was established as part of the then-Court Government's response to the debate regarding logging in old-growth forests. The minister responsible for the agency is the Minister for Forestry, currently Jackie Jarvis of the Labor Party. (https://www.wa.gov.au/government/premier-and-cabinet-ministers/jackie-jarvis)

Prior to the establishment of the commission, commercial logging and harvesting, as well as sharefarming, was undertaken by the then-Department of Conservation and Land Management. Its creation meant the conservation and commercial interests of the state, with respect to forestry, were separated and therefore removed a perceived conflict of interest.

As part of its operations, the Forest Products Commission operates a commercial nursery and seed technologies facility at West Manjimup.

The commission undertakes its operations in accordance with ISO 14001:2004, the Australian Forestry Standard (AS4708:2013 – Australian Standard for Sustainable Forest Management) and PEFC Chain of Custody of Forest and Tree-Based Products (Program for the Endorsement of Forest Certification ST 2002). These are an integral part of the commission's forest management policy, which states: "The Forest Products Commission (FPC) is committed to ensuring Western Australia's renewable timber resources are managed sustainably through the implementation of forest management practices that are environmentally sound, socially acceptable and economically viable." (https://www.wa.gov.au/government/publications/fpc-policy-9-forest-management)

== General manager ==
When the agency was established in November 2000, Dr Paul Biggs was appointed general manager. The general manager is now Stuart West.

The former Minister for Forestry, Hon. Terry Redman, noted in the media release announcing Dr Biggs' departure that his contribution to the industry was both appreciated and respected across Australia.

Through his role at the FPC, Paul has been dedicated to strengthening the industry and the regional communities it supports while maintaining a strong focus on good environmental management. I wish him well in his future endeavours.

— Minister for Forestry Hon. Terry Redman in press release announcing Dr Biggs' departure

== Protection of native forests ==
In 2021, the State Government announced it would stop the logging of native forests from 2024 onwards. Any native timber harvested after that time will only be for forest management activities, such as ecological thinning for forest health, road and track maintenance, and clearing to conduct approved mining operations. As a result, the Forest Products Commission's focus will shift to sustainable timber plantations. (https://www.mediastatements.wa.gov.au/Pages/McGowan/2021/09/McGowan-Governments-historic-move-to-protect-native-forests.aspx)

== West Manjimup Nursery and Seed Centre ==
(https://www.wa.gov.au/service/business-support/industry-development/buy-native-and-tree-seeds-the-forest-products-commission) Situated on a 266-hectare site, the centre operates under the NGIA Nursery Industry Accreditation Scheme and provides seeds and seedlings for the Forest Products Commission's regeneration of native forest and establishing forest plantations, as well as supplying native and softwood seed to the general public.

The main seedling products include maritime pine (Pinus pinaster), radiata pine (Pinus radiata) and karri (Eucalyptus diversicolor). Seed cleaning and treatment services are available to increase seed viability.

The centre, which produces more than 14 million seedlings each year, was a back-to-back winner of the Western Australian Nursery and Garden Industry Award for Best Large Production Nursery in 2006 and 2007.

== Carbon trading ==
Legislation introduced in 2021 now allows the Forest Products Commission to trade in carbon. It came after the Forest Products Act 2000 was amended, giving the commission the right to own, trade and otherwise deal with carbon assets. (https://www.mediastatements.wa.gov.au/Pages/McGowan/2021/10/New-legislation-to-enable-carbon-trading-by-Forest-Products-Commission.aspx)

== Fire management ==
The Forest Products Commission works with the Department of Biodiversity, Conservation and Attractions and Department of Fire and Emergency Services on fire suppression and fuel reduction activities to protect forest assets and property.
