= Department of Lands and Surveys =

Government department of Western Australia

The Survey Office of Western Australia commenced as early as 1829, making the succeeding agency, the Department of Lands and Surveys, one of the oldest government agencies in Western Australia.

- Department of Lands and Surveys, 1 January 1890 – 30 June 1986
- Department of Land Administration, 1 July 1986 – 30 June 2003
- Department of Land Information, 1 July 2003 – 31 December 2006
- Landgate (officially the Western Australian Land Information Authority) – 1 January 2007

== See also ==
- Surveyor General of Western Australia
