= B. formosa =

B. formosa may refer to:

- Banksia formosa, a shrub endemic to Western Australia
- Belvosia formosa, a tachina fly
- Bematistes formosa, an African butterfly
- Billbergia formosa, a New World plant
- Bucculatrix formosa, a ribbed cocoon maker
- Burmeistera formosa, a plant endemic to Ecuador
