= Torch plant =

Torch plant is a common name for several plants and may refer to:

- Aloe arborescens
- Aristaloe aristata
- Billbergia pyramidalis (flaming torch plant)
