= B. nana =

B. nana may refer to:

- Banksia nana, the dwarf dryandra, a shrub species
- Bantia nana, a praying mantis species
- Barygenys nana, a frog species endemic to Papua New Guinea
- Betula nana, the dwarf birch, a tree species
- Billbergia nana, a plant species endemic to Brazil
- Boswellia nana, a plant species endemic to Yemen's Soqotra Island
- Brachyphylla nana, the Cuban fruit-eating bat, a bat species found in Bahamas, Cayman Islands, Cuba, the Dominican Republic, Haiti, Jamaica, and Turks and Caicos Islands
- Brookesia nana, an extremely small species of chameleon, endemic to montane rainforest in northern Madagascar

== See also ==
- Nana (disambiguation)
