= Billbergia iridifolia =

Scientific classification
- Kingdom: Plantae
- Clade: Tracheophytes
- Clade: Angiosperms
- Clade: Monocots
- Clade: Commelinids
- Order: Poales
- Family: Bromeliaceae
- Genus: Billbergia
- Subgenus: Billbergia subg. Billbergia
- Species: B. iridifolia

Binomial name
- Billbergia iridifolia (Nees & Mart.) Lindl.

Species of flowering plant

Billbergia iridifolia is a plant species in the genus Billbergia. This species is native to Brazil.

== Cultivars ==
- Billbergia 'Blireiana'
