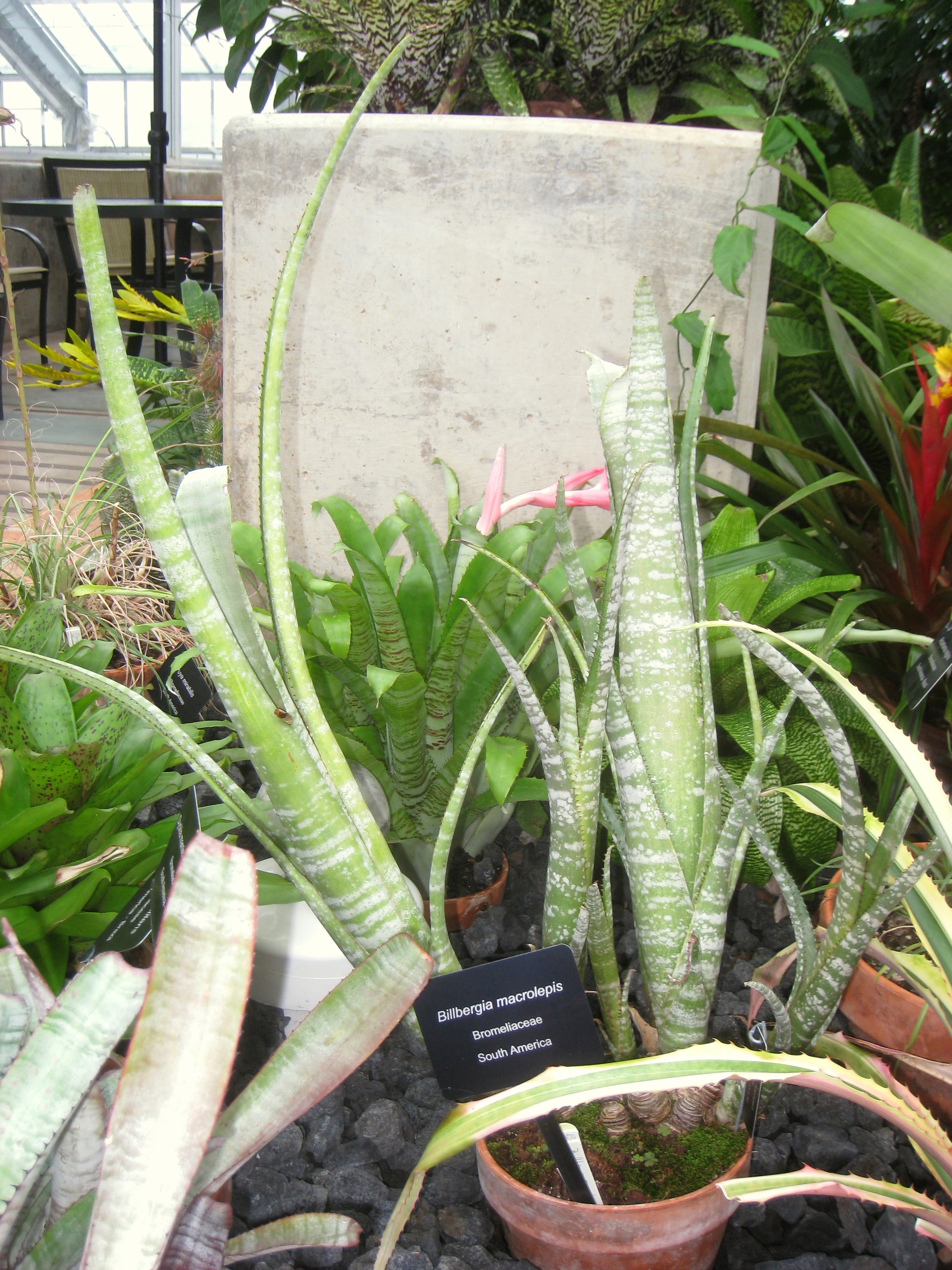

Scientific classification
- Kingdom: Plantae
- Clade: Tracheophytes
- Clade: Angiosperms
- Clade: Monocots
- Clade: Commelinids
- Order: Poales
- Family: Bromeliaceae
- Genus: Billbergia
- Subgenus: Billbergia subg. Helicodea
- Species: B. macrolepis

Binomial name
- Billbergia macrolepis L.B.Sm.

Synonyms
- Billbergia richteriana E.Pereira; Billbergia richteriana var. bicolor E.Pereira

= Billbergia macrolepis =

Species of flowering plant

Billbergia macrolepis is a species of flowering plant in the genus Billbergia. This species is native to Costa Rica, Panama, Colombia, Ecuador, Venezuela, and Guyana.

== Cultivars ==
- Billbergia 'Anubis'
