= Billbergia robert-readii =

Scientific classification
- Kingdom: Plantae
- Clade: Tracheophytes
- Clade: Angiosperms
- Clade: Monocots
- Clade: Commelinids
- Order: Poales
- Family: Bromeliaceae
- Genus: Billbergia
- Subgenus: Billbergia subg. Helicodea
- Species: B. robert-readii

Binomial name
- Billbergia robert-readii E.Gross & Rauh

Species of plant

Billbergia robert-readii is a species of flowering plant in the genus Billbergia. This species is native to Bolivia and Peru.
