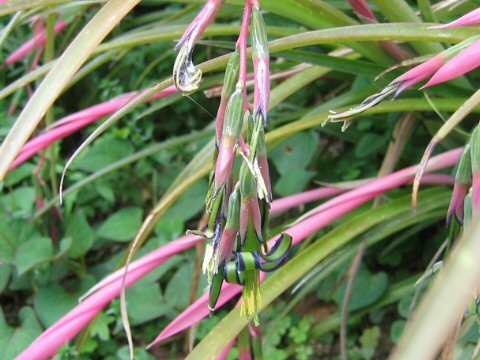

Scientific classification
- Kingdom: Plantae
- Clade: Tracheophytes
- Clade: Angiosperms
- Clade: Monocots
- Clade: Commelinids
- Order: Poales
- Family: Bromeliaceae
- Genus: Billbergia
- Subgenus: Billbergia subg. Billbergia
- Species: B. nutans

Binomial name
- Billbergia nutans H.Wendl.

Synonyms
- Billbergia linearifolia Baker; Billbergia minuta Mez; Billbergia schimperiana Wittm. ex Baker

= Billbergia nutans =

Queen's-tears

Species of epiphyte

Billbergia nutans, or Queen's-tears, is an epiphytic bromeliad native to Brazil, Paraguay, Uruguay, and Argentina.

This plant is often used as an ornamental plant.

== Varieties ==
Two varieties are recognized:

1. Billbergia nutans var. nutans – Brazil, Paraguay, Uruguay, and Argentina
2. Billbergia nutans var. schimperiana (Wittm. ex Baker) Mez – Brazil, Paraguay

== Cultivars ==
- Billbergia 'Albertii'
- Billbergia 'Baraquiniano-Nutans'
- Billbergia 'Beadleberg'
- Billbergia 'Blireiana'
- Billbergia 'Candy'
- Billbergia 'Carminea'
- Billbergia 'Elvenia Slosson'
- Billbergia 'Frau Pia Roesslein'
- Billbergia 'Hoelscheriana'
- Billbergia 'Intermedia'
- Billbergia 'Ivey Meyer'
- Billbergia 'Joseph Marechal'
- Billbergia 'Kahibah'
- Billbergia 'Leodiensis'
- Billbergia 'Lissom'
- Billbergia 'Marechalii'
- Billbergia 'Morreniana'
- Billbergia 'Pioupionii'
- Billbergia 'Rosea'
- Billbergia 'Rubro-Cyanea'
- Billbergia 'Salmonea'
- Billbergia 'Theodore L. Mead'
- Billbergia 'Ultrajactensis'
- Billbergia 'Vittato-Nutans'
- Billbergia 'Wantenii'
- Billbergia 'Windii'
- Billbergia 'Worleana'
- × Billmea 'Emma Francis Stewart'
- × Billnelia 'Fred Eichholtz'
- × Billnelia 'Perringiana'
- × Cryptbergia 'Mead'
- × Cryptbergia 'Pinkie'
- × Cryptbergia 'Red Burst'
- × Cryptbergia 'Rubra'
- × Neobergia 'Noddy'
- × Neobergia 'Perneri'
- × Nidbergia 'Chas Hodgson'
