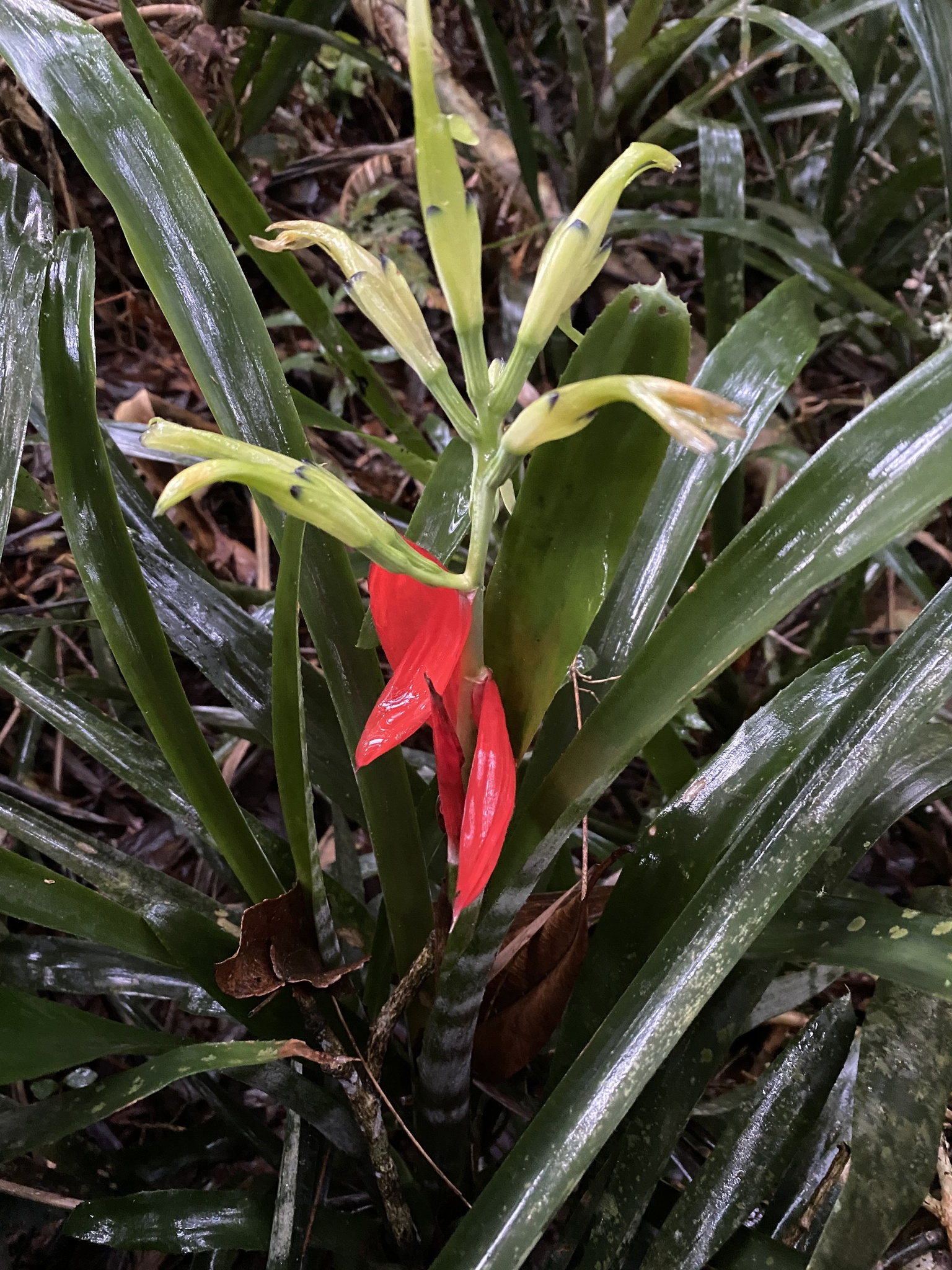
- Billbergia amoena

Scientific classification
- Kingdom: Plantae
- Clade: Tracheophytes
- Clade: Angiosperms
- Clade: Monocots
- Clade: Commelinids
- Order: Poales
- Family: Bromeliaceae
- Subfamily: Bromelioideae
- Genus: Billbergia; Thunb.

Type species
- Billbergia amoena

Synonyms
- Anacyclia Hoffmanns.; Eucallias Raf.; Jonghea Lem.; Cremobotrys Beer; Helicodea Lem.; Pseudaechmea L.B.Sm. & Read

= Billbergia =

Genus of flowering plants

Billbergia is a genus of flowering plants in the family Bromeliaceae, subfamily Bromelioideae.

== Description ==
The Billbergia species are rosette-forming, evergreen perennials, usually epiphytic, occasionally terrestrial or lithotypic in habit. They are mostly medium-sized species with small funnel diameters. Most species are epiphytes, some species grow on plants, on rocks, as well as directly on the ground. Water collects in the leaf funnels. In many funnels there are small biotopes with several species of animals and algae and aquatic plants. The rough leaves are always reinforced on the edge (as with all genera of the Bromelioideae), with a spiked tip. In some species and varieties, the leaves are beautifully colored. In many species, suction scales are everywhere on the leaves, often also on the inflorescence.

They often bloom with brilliantly colored flowers with long-lasting inflorescence (inflorescences). The inflorescence often hang with terminal scape, erect or decurved. Strikingly colored bracts (bracts) often sit on the inflorescence; the color red dominates (usually with a blue component).

Flowers bisexual, sessile or conspicuously pedicellate; sepals free; petals free, threefold with a double perianth, with basal appendages, often spirally recurved at anthesis; stamens free or adnate to the petals, the anthers without appendages; inferior ovary. There are three sepals present. The three petals often have different shades of blue, there are also yellow, green and white. Birds are the pollinators of the blue-flowered species. An important characteristic that distinguishes them from other genera is that their petals curl up when they wither. The individual flowers only bloom for a few hours and can be pollinated for much less time. Most species have small scales (Ligulea) at the base of the petals. The six stamens and the style often protrude far from the flower. A large part of the species blooms at night. The flower formula is: $\star$ bis $\downarrow \; K_3 \; C_{(3)} \; A_{3+3} \; G_{\overline{(3)}}$

The fruits are multi-seeded berries, often heavily colored when ripe; red to blue dominate here. The fruits are eaten by animals (mainly by birds, less often by bats and monkeys). The seeds are excreted undigested and end up on branches with the feces.

== Taxonomy ==
The Swedish botanist Carl Peter Thunberg (1743–1828) established the genus Billbergia in Plantarum Brasiliensium ..., 3, 1821 p. 30 with the type species being Billbergia speciosa. The genus, named for the Swedish botanist, zoologist, and anatomist Gustaf Johan Billberg (1772–1844), is divided into two subgenera: Billbergia and Helicodea. Species in subgenus Helicodea are distinguishable by the tightly recurved 'clock spring' flower petals, unlike other billbergias where the petals are flared.

=== Species ===
Subgenus	Image	Scientific name	Distribution
Subgenus Helicodea (Lemaire) Baker		Billbergia acreana H. Luther	Brazil (Acre)
Subgenus Helicodea (Lemaire) Baker		Billbergia alfonsi-joannis Reitz	from Espírito Santo to Santa Catarina
Subgenus Helicodea (Lemaire) Baker		Billbergia brasiliensis L.B.Sm.	Rio de Janeiro
Subgenus Helicodea (Lemaire) Baker		Billbergia brachysiphon L.B.Sm.	Brazil, Colombia, Ecuador
Subgenus Helicodea (Lemaire) Baker		Billbergia cardenasii L.B.Sm.	Bolivia
Subgenus Helicodea (Lemaire) Baker		Billbergia cylindrostachya Mez	Rio de Janeiro
Subgenus Helicodea (Lemaire) Baker		Billbergia dasilvae Leme	Rondônia
Subgenus Helicodea (Lemaire) Baker		Billbergia decora Poepp. & Endl.	Peru, Bolivia, Brazil
Subgenus Helicodea (Lemaire) Baker		Billbergia eloiseae L.B.Sm. & Read	Colombia
Subgenus Helicodea (Lemaire) Baker		Billbergia formosa Ule	Peru
Subgenus Helicodea (Lemaire) Baker		Billbergia incarnata (Ruiz & Pavón) Schultes f.	Peru
Subgenus Helicodea (Lemaire) Baker		Billbergia issingiana T.Krömer & E.Gross	Bolivia
Subgenus Helicodea (Lemaire) Baker		Billbergia jandebrabanderi R.Vásquez & Ibisch	Bolivia
Subgenus Helicodea (Lemaire) Baker		Billbergia macrolepis L.B.Sm.	Costa Rica, Panama, Colombia, Ecuador, Venezuela, Guyana
Subgenus Helicodea (Lemaire) Baker		Billbergia magnifica Mez	Brazil, Paraguay
Subgenus Helicodea (Lemaire) Baker		Billbergia meyeri Mez	Brazil, Bolivia
Subgenus Helicodea (Lemaire) Baker		Billbergia microlepis L.B.Sm.	Bolivia
Subgenus Helicodea (Lemaire) Baker		Billbergia oxysepala Mez	Acre, Ecuador
Subgenus Helicodea (Lemaire) Baker		Billbergia pallidiflora Liebmann	Mexico and Central America from Sinaloa to Nicaragua
Subgenus Helicodea (Lemaire) Baker		Billbergia porteana Brongn. ex Beer	Brazil, Paraguay
Subgenus Helicodea (Lemaire) Baker		Billbergia robert-readii E.Gross & Rauh	Peru
Subgenus Helicodea (Lemaire) Baker		Billbergia rosea Beer	Trinidad, Venezuela
Subgenus Helicodea (Lemaire) Baker		Billbergia rubicunda Mez	Suriname
Subgenus Helicodea (Lemaire) Baker		Billbergia rupestris L.B.Sm.	Colombia, Acre
Subgenus Helicodea (Lemaire) Baker		Billbergia stenopetala Harms	Ecuador, Peru
Subgenus Helicodea (Lemaire) Baker		Billbergia tessmannii Harms	Peru
Subgenus Helicodea (Lemaire) Baker		Billbergia violacea Beer	Brazil, Colombia, Guianas
Subgenus Helicodea (Lemaire) Baker		Billbergia zebrina (Herb.) Lindl.	Brazil, Argentina, Uruguay, Paraguay
Subgenus Billbergia		Billbergia ambigua (L.B.Sm. & Read) Betancur & N.R.Salinas, syn. Pseudaechmea ambigua	Antioquia
Subgenus Billbergia		Billbergia amoena (G.Lodd.) Lindl.	Brazil
Subgenus Billbergia		Billbergia bradeana L.B.Sm.	Espírito Santo
Subgenus Billbergia		Billbergia buchholtzii Mez	Brazil, but probably extinct
Subgenus Billbergia		Billbergia castelensis E.Pereira	Espírito Santo
Subgenus Billbergia		Billbergia chlorantha L.B.Sm.	Espírito Santo
Subgenus Billbergia		Billbergia × claudioi Leme - Brazil	
Subgenus Billbergia		Billbergia distachya (Vell.) Mez	southern Brazil
Subgenus Billbergia		Billbergia domingosmartinsis E.Gross	Espírito Santo
Subgenus Billbergia		Billbergia elegans Martius ex Schultes f.	Espírito Santo, Minas Gerais
Subgenus Billbergia		Billbergia euphemiae E.Morren	southeastern Brazil
Subgenus Billbergia		Billbergia horrida Regel	southeastern Brazil
Subgenus Billbergia		Billbergia iridifolia (Nees & Mart.) Lindl.	southeastern Brazil
Subgenus Billbergia		Billbergia kautskyana E.Pereira	Espírito Santo
Subgenus Billbergia		Billbergia laxiflora L.B.Sm.	Espírito Santo
Subgenus Billbergia		Billbergia leptopoda L.B.Sm.	Bahia, Espírito Santo, Minas Gerais
Subgenus Billbergia		Billbergia lietzei E.Morren	Espírito Santo
Subgenus Billbergia		Billbergia lymanii E.Pereira & Leme	southeastern Brazil
Subgenus Billbergia		Billbergia macracantha E.Pereira	Rio de Janeiro
Subgenus Billbergia		Billbergia macrocalyx Hooker	Bahia, Minas Gerais
Subgenus Billbergia		Billbergia manarae Steyerm.	Venezuela
Subgenus Billbergia		Billbergia minarum L.B.Sm.	Espírito Santo, Minas Gerais
Subgenus Billbergia		Billbergia morelii Brongn.	eastern Brazil
Subgenus Billbergia		Billbergia nana E.Pereira	Bahia, Espírito Santo
Subgenus Billbergia		Billbergia nutans H.Wendland ex Regel	Brazil, Argentina, Uruguay, Paraguay
Subgenus Billbergia		Billbergia pohliana Mez	Minas Gerais
Subgenus Billbergia		Billbergia pyramidalis (Sims) Lindl.	Brazil, Venezuela, French Guiana, Lesser Antilles, Cuba; naturalized in Mauritius
Subgenus Billbergia		Billbergia reichardtii Wawra	Espírito Santo, Minas Gerais
Subgenus Billbergia		Billbergia sanderiana E.Morren	southeastern Brazil
Subgenus Billbergia		Billbergia saundersii W.Bull	eastern Brazil
Subgenus Billbergia		Billbergia seidelii L.B.Sm. & Reitz	Espírito Santo, Rio de Janeiro
Subgenus Billbergia		Billbergia speciosa Thunb.	southeastern Brazil
Subgenus Billbergia		Billbergia tweedieana Baker	southeastern Brazil
Subgenus Billbergia		Billbergia viridiflora H.Wendland	Belize, Guatemala, Tabasco
Subgenus Billbergia		Billbergia vittata Brongn.	eastern Brazil

== Distribution ==
They are native to forest and scrub, up to an altitude of 1,700 m (5,577 ft), in southern Mexico, the West Indies, Central America and South America, with many species endemic to Brazil.
