= Billbergia oxysepala =

Scientific classification
- Kingdom: Plantae
- Clade: Embryophytes
- Clade: Tracheophytes
- Clade: Spermatophytes
- Clade: Angiosperms
- Clade: Monocots
- Clade: Commelinids
- Order: Poales
- Family: Bromeliaceae
- Genus: Billbergia
- Subgenus: Billbergia subg. Helicodea
- Species: B. oxysepala

Binomial name
- Billbergia oxysepala Mez

Synonyms
- Heterotypic Synonyms: Billbergia oxypetala Ule

Species of flowering plant

Billbergia oxysepala is a species of flowering plant in the family Bromeliaceae. This species is native to Ecuador and to the Brazilian State of Acre.

== Cultivars ==
- Billbergia oxysepala × eloiseae
