= Billbergia magnifica =

Scientific classification
- Kingdom: Plantae
- Clade: Embryophytes
- Clade: Tracheophytes
- Clade: Spermatophytes
- Clade: Angiosperms
- Clade: Monocots
- Clade: Commelinids
- Order: Poales
- Family: Bromeliaceae
- Genus: Billbergia
- Subgenus: Billbergia subg. Helicodea
- Species: B. magnifica

Binomial name
- Billbergia magnifica Mez

Synonyms
- Heterotypic Synonyms: Billbergia magnifica var. acutisepala Hassl.

Species of flowering plant

Billbergia magnifica is a species of flowering plant in the familuy Billbergia. This species is native to Brazil and Paraguay.
