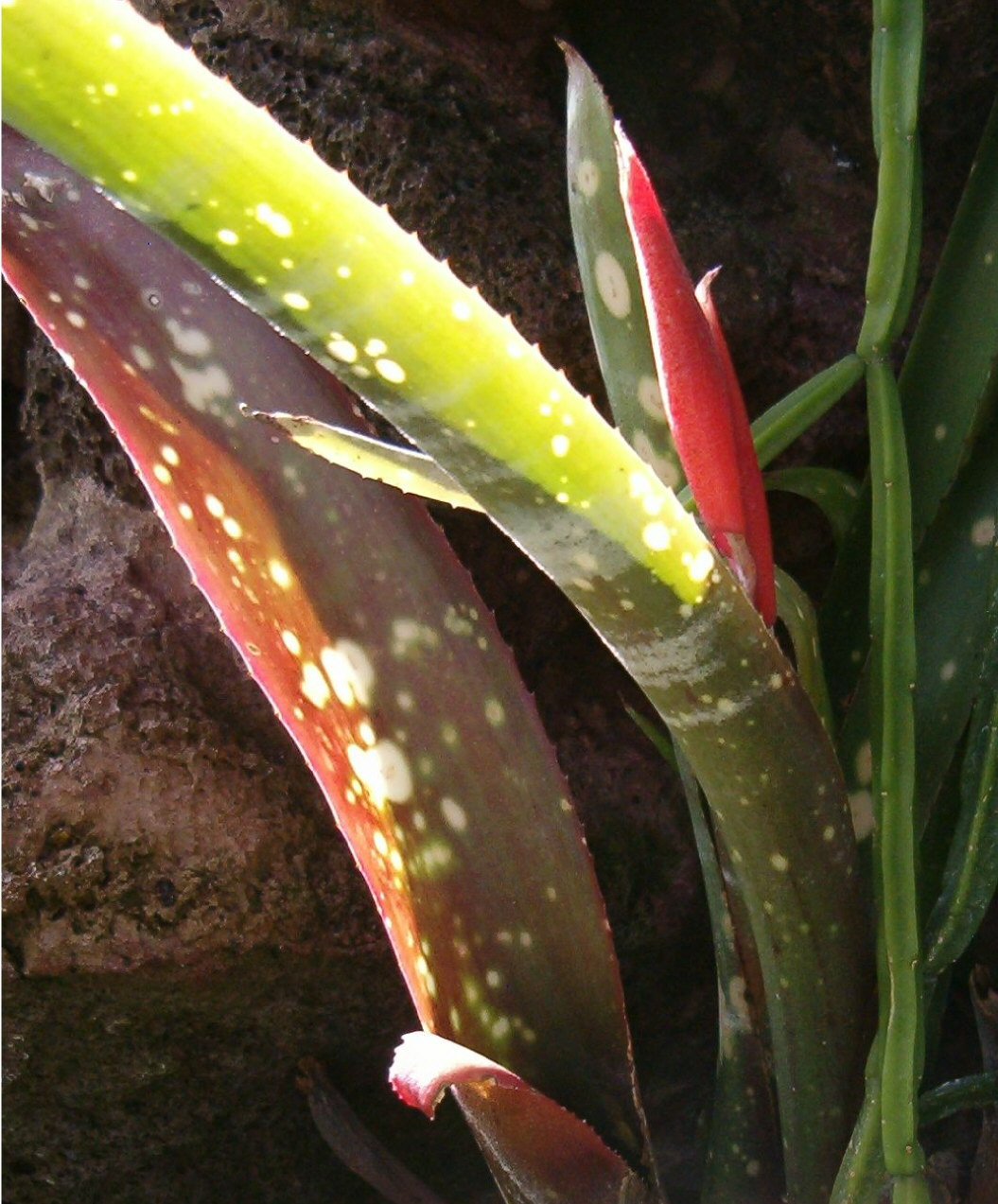

Scientific classification
- Kingdom: Plantae
- Clade: Tracheophytes
- Clade: Angiosperms
- Clade: Monocots
- Clade: Commelinids
- Order: Poales
- Family: Bromeliaceae
- Genus: Billbergia
- Subgenus: Billbergia subg. Billbergia
- Species: B. saundersii

Binomial name
- Billbergia saundersii W.Bull

Synonyms
- Billbergia chlorosticta hort. Saunders ex Mast

= Billbergia saundersii =

Species of flowering plant

Billbergia saundersii is a species of flowering plant in the genus Billbergia. This species is endemic to Brazil.

== Cultivars ==
- Billbergia 'Aussie Rose'
- Billbergia 'Charles Dewey'
- Billbergia 'Cream Puff'
- Billbergia 'Escaffrei'
- Billbergia 'Fantasia'
- Billbergia 'Fascinator'
- Billbergia 'Gem'
- Billbergia 'Gireaudiana'
- Billbergia 'Gireondiana'
- Billbergia 'Gladly'
- Billbergia 'Hoelscheriana'
- Billbergia 'Ivey Meyer'
- Billbergia 'Joyous'
- Billbergia 'Leopoldii'
- Billbergia 'Makoyana'
- Billbergia 'Nez Misso'
- Billbergia 'Robert Saunders'
- Billbergia 'Rubro-Cyanea'
