= Billbergia viridiflora =

Scientific classification
- Kingdom: Plantae
- Clade: Embryophytes
- Clade: Tracheophytes
- Clade: Spermatophytes
- Clade: Angiosperms
- Clade: Monocots
- Clade: Commelinids
- Order: Poales
- Family: Bromeliaceae
- Genus: Billbergia
- Subgenus: Billbergia subg. Billbergia
- Species: B. viridiflora

Binomial name
- Billbergia viridiflora H.Wendland

Species of flowering plant

Billbergia viridiflora is a plant species in the genus Billbergia native to Tabasco, Belize and Guatemala.

== Cultivars ==
- × Billnelia 'Sebastian Laruelle'
