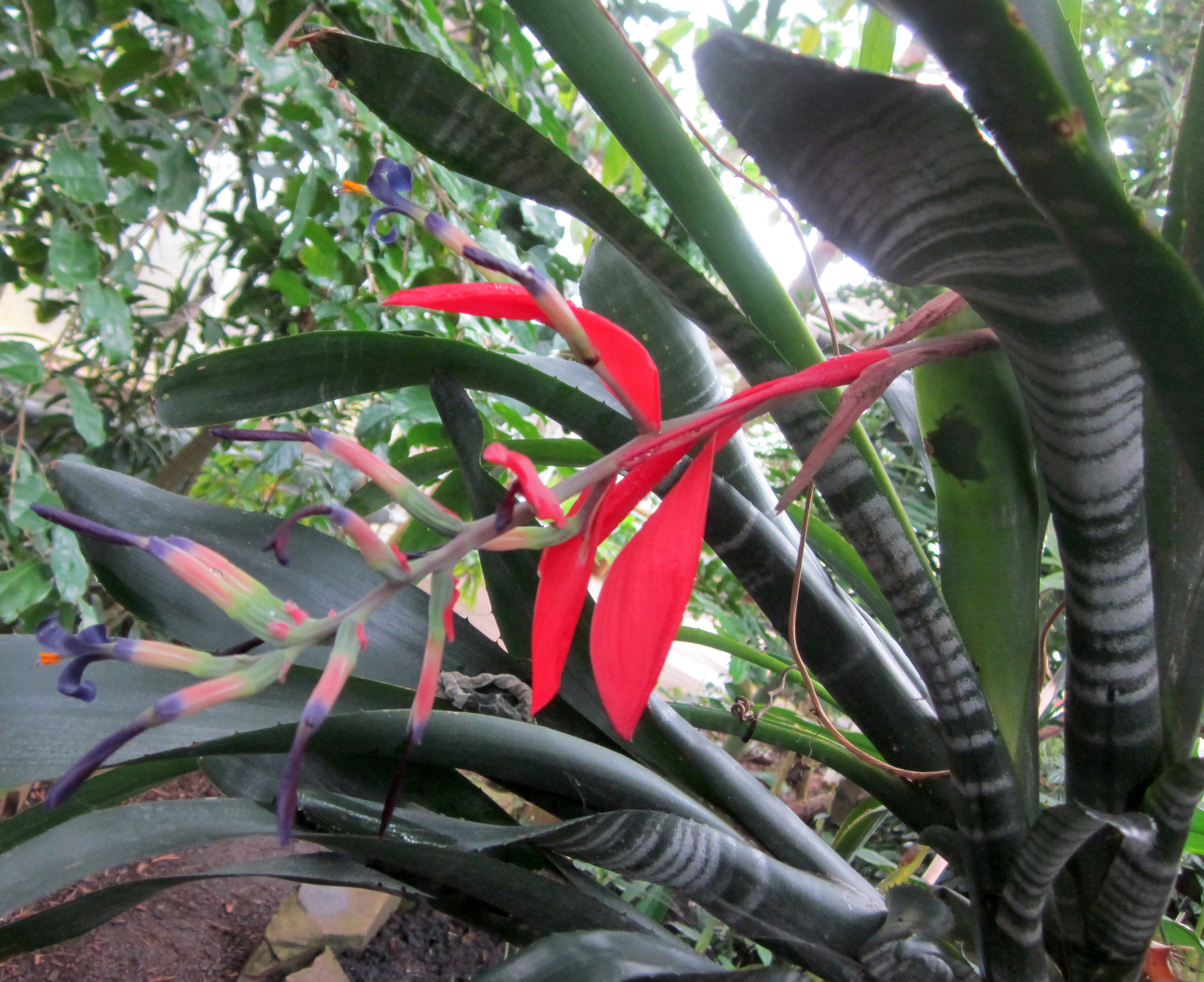

Scientific classification
- Kingdom: Plantae
- Clade: Tracheophytes
- Clade: Angiosperms
- Clade: Monocots
- Clade: Commelinids
- Order: Poales
- Family: Bromeliaceae
- Genus: Billbergia
- Subgenus: Billbergia subg. Helicodea
- Species: B. porteana

Binomial name
- Billbergia porteana Brongniart ex Beer

= Billbergia porteana =

Species of flowering plant

Billbergia porteana is a plant species in the genus Billbergia. This species is native to Brazil and Paraguay.

== Cultivars ==
- Billbergia 'Thelma Darling Hodge'
