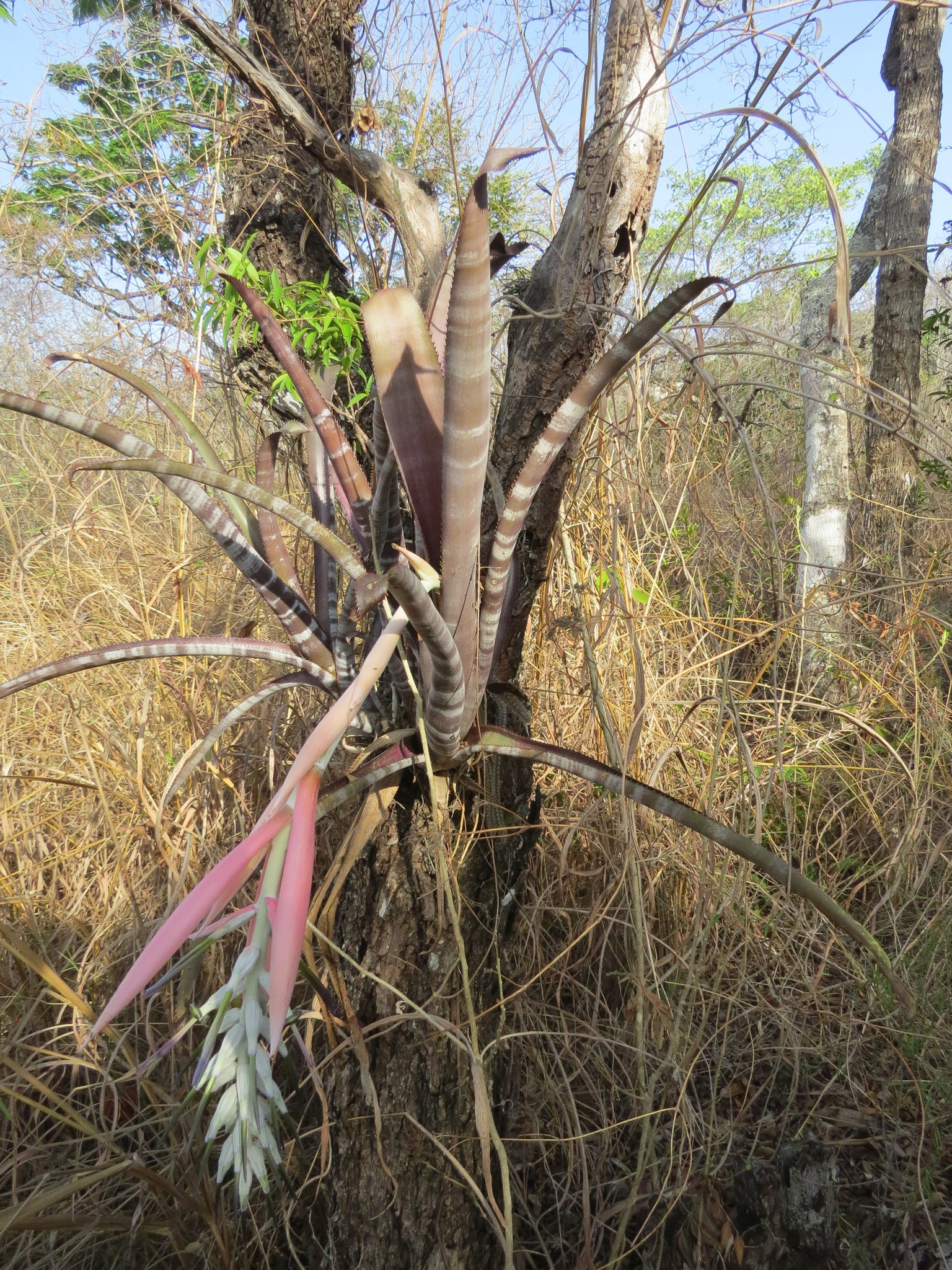

Scientific classification
- Kingdom: Plantae
- Clade: Tracheophytes
- Clade: Angiosperms
- Clade: Monocots
- Clade: Commelinids
- Order: Poales
- Family: Bromeliaceae
- Genus: Billbergia
- Subgenus: Billbergia subg. Helicodea
- Species: B. pallidiflora

Binomial name
- Billbergia pallidiflora Liebmann

Synonyms
- Billbergia chiapensis Matuda; Billbergia mexicana Mez; Billbergia oaxacana Matuda

= Billbergia pallidiflora =

Species of flowering plant

Billbergia pallidiflora is a species of flowering plant in the family Bromeliaceae. This species is native to Central America (Guatemala, El Salvador, Honduras, Nicaragua) and western Mexico (as far north as Sinaloa).
