= Billbergia tessmannii =

Scientific classification
- Kingdom: Plantae
- Clade: Tracheophytes
- Clade: Angiosperms
- Clade: Monocots
- Clade: Commelinids
- Order: Poales
- Family: Bromeliaceae
- Genus: Billbergia
- Subgenus: Billbergia subg. Helicodea
- Species: B. tessmannii

Binomial name
- Billbergia tessmannii Harms

Species of plant

Billbergia tessmannii is a species of flowering plant in the genus Billbergia. It is endemic to Peru.

== Cultivars ==
- Billbergia 'Bam'
- Billbergia 'Selby'
- Billbergia 'Sunset'
