= Billbergia decora =

Scientific classification
- Kingdom: Plantae
- Clade: Tracheophytes
- Clade: Angiosperms
- Clade: Monocots
- Clade: Commelinids
- Order: Poales
- Family: Bromeliaceae
- Genus: Billbergia
- Subgenus: Billbergia subg. Helicodea
- Species: B. decora

Binomial name
- Billbergia decora Poepp. & Endl.

Synonyms
- Billbergia baraquiniana Lem.; Billbergia boliviensis Baker; Helicodea baraquiana Lem.; Helicodea baraquiniana Lem. ex Baker

Species of flowering plant

Billbergia decora is a species of flowering plant in the genus Billbergia. This species is native to Peru, Bolivia and Brazil.

== Cultivars ==
- Billbergia 'Bruantii'
- Billbergia 'Leopoldii'
- Billbergia 'Showboat'
- Billbergia 'Sunset'
- Billbergia 'Theodore L. Mead'
- Billbergia 'Windii'
- × Billmea 'Casper'
