= Billbergia meyeri =

Scientific classification
- Kingdom: Plantae
- Clade: Embryophytes
- Clade: Tracheophytes
- Clade: Spermatophytes
- Clade: Angiosperms
- Clade: Monocots
- Clade: Commelinids
- Order: Poales
- Family: Bromeliaceae
- Genus: Billbergia
- Subgenus: Billbergia subg. Helicodea
- Species: B. meyeri

Binomial name
- Billbergia meyeri Mez

Synonyms
- Heterotypic Synonyms: Billbergia leucantha Hoehne

Species of flowering plant

Billbergia meyeri is a species of flowering plant in the family Bromeliaceae. This species is native to Bolivia and Brazil.
