= Billbergia zebrina =

Scientific classification
- Kingdom: Plantae
- Clade: Tracheophytes
- Clade: Angiosperms
- Clade: Monocots
- Clade: Commelinids
- Order: Poales
- Family: Bromeliaceae
- Genus: Billbergia
- Subgenus: Billbergia subg. Helicodea
- Species: B. zebrina

Binomial name
- Billbergia zebrina (Herb.) Lindl.

Synonyms
- Bromelia zebrina Herb.; Helicodea zebrina (Herb.) Lem.; Cremobotrys zebrina (Herb.) Beer ex B.D.Jacks.; Anacyclia farinosa Hoffmanns.; Eucallias versicolor Raf.; Billbergia farinosa (Hoffmanns.) Baker; Billbergia canterae André

Species of flowering plant

Billbergia zebrina is a species of flowering plant in the family Bromeliaceae. This species is native to Brazil, Argentina, Uruguay, and Paraguay.

== Cultivars ==
- Billbergia 'Ambiorix'
- Billbergia 'Astro Pink'
- Billbergia 'Astronaut'
- Billbergia 'Bam'
- Billbergia 'Charles Dewey'
- Billbergia 'Dancing Waters'
- Billbergia 'E. Thomas Witte'
- Billbergia 'El Capitan'
- Billbergia 'Ellen Jordan Stewart'
- Billbergia 'Evelyn Metz'
- Billbergia 'Full of Life'
- Billbergia 'Jubilee'
- Billbergia 'Lucas Coelho'
- Billbergia 'Ribbons & Lace'
- Billbergia 'Strange Magic'
- Billbergia 'Xmas Bells'
- Billbergia 'Xmas Cheer'
- × Billmea 'Curlylocks'
