= Billbergia violacea =

Scientific classification
- Kingdom: Plantae
- Clade: Tracheophytes
- Clade: Angiosperms
- Clade: Monocots
- Clade: Commelinids
- Order: Poales
- Family: Bromeliaceae
- Genus: Billbergia
- Subgenus: Billbergia subg. Helicodea
- Species: B. violacea

Binomial name
- Billbergia violacea Beer

Species of flowering plant

Billbergia violacea is a plant species in the genus Billbergia. This species is native to Bolivia.

== Cultivars ==
- Billbergia 'Koechlii'
