= Billbergia morelii =

Scientific classification
- Kingdom: Plantae
- Clade: Tracheophytes
- Clade: Angiosperms
- Clade: Monocots
- Clade: Commelinids
- Order: Poales
- Family: Bromeliaceae
- Genus: Billbergia
- Subgenus: Billbergia subg. Billbergia
- Species: B. morelii

Binomial name
- Billbergia morelii Brongn.

Species of flowering plant

Billbergia morelii is a plant species in the genus Billbergia. This species is endemic to Brazil.

== Cultivars ==
- Billbergia 'Andegavensis'
- Billbergia 'Belgica'
- Billbergia 'Frolic'
- Billbergia 'Full Moon'
- Billbergia 'Gargoyle'
- Billbergia 'Jenischiana'
- Billbergia 'Koechlii'
- Billbergia 'Makoyana'
- Billbergia 'Margarita'
- Billbergia 'Vexillaria'
- Billbergia 'Wantenii'
- Billbergia 'Worleana'
