= Billbergia lymanii =

Scientific classification
- Kingdom: Plantae
- Clade: Tracheophytes
- Clade: Angiosperms
- Clade: Monocots
- Clade: Commelinids
- Order: Poales
- Family: Bromeliaceae
- Genus: Billbergia
- Subgenus: Billbergia subg. Billbergia
- Species: B. lymanii

Binomial name
- Billbergia lymanii E.Pereira & Leme

Species of flowering plant

Billbergia lymanii is a plant species in the genus Billbergia. This species is endemic to Brazil.
