= Billbergia microlepis =

Scientific classification
- Kingdom: Plantae
- Clade: Tracheophytes
- Clade: Angiosperms
- Clade: Monocots
- Clade: Commelinids
- Order: Poales
- Family: Bromeliaceae
- Genus: Billbergia
- Subgenus: Billbergia subg. Helicodea
- Species: B. microlepis

Binomial name
- Billbergia microlepis L.B.Sm.

Species of flowering plant

Billbergia microlepis is a species of flowering plant in the genus Billbergia. This species is endemic to Bolivia.
