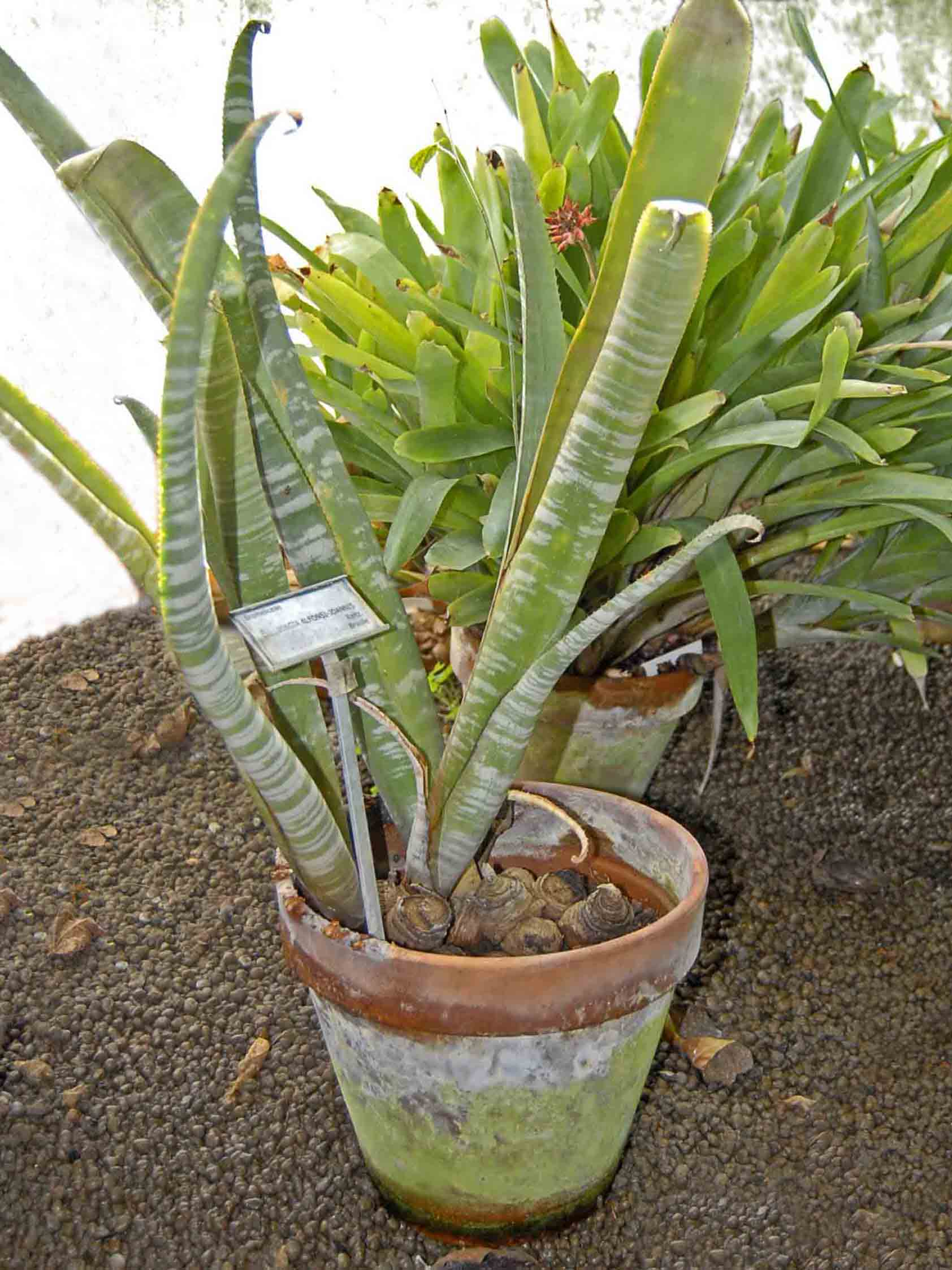

Scientific classification
- Kingdom: Plantae
- Clade: Tracheophytes
- Clade: Angiosperms
- Clade: Monocots
- Clade: Commelinids
- Order: Poales
- Family: Bromeliaceae
- Genus: Billbergia
- Subgenus: Billbergia subg. Helicodea
- Species: B. alfonsi-joannis

Binomial name
- Billbergia alfonsi-joannis Reitz

= Billbergia alfonsi-joannis =

Species of flowering plant

Billbergia alfonsi-joannis is a species of bromeliad in the flowering plant genus Billbergia. This species is endemic to southeastern Brazil, from Espírito Santo to Santa Catarina.

== Cultivars ==
- Billbergia 'Alligator'
- Billbergia 'Arctic Queen'
- Billbergia 'Desiree'
- Billbergia 'Gold Dust'
- Billbergia 'Jingle Bells'
- Billbergia 'Manta Ray'
- Billbergia 'Pink Floriate'
- Billbergia 'Satin Lady'
- Billbergia 'Satin Magic'
- Billbergia 'Satin Queen'
- Billbergia 'Snowflake'
- Billbergia 'Swordfish'
