= Billbergia rosea =

Scientific classification
- Kingdom: Plantae
- Clade: Tracheophytes
- Clade: Angiosperms
- Clade: Monocots
- Clade: Commelinids
- Order: Poales
- Family: Bromeliaceae
- Genus: Billbergia
- Subgenus: Billbergia subg. Helicodea
- Species: B. rosea

Binomial name
- Billbergia rosea Beer

Synonyms
- Billbergia granulosa Brongn.; Billbergia nobilis W.Bull; Billbergia venezuelana Mez

Species of flowering plant

Billbergia rosea is a species of flowering plant in the genus Billbergia. This species is native to Venezuela and to the Island of Trinidad.
