= Billbergia stenopetala =

Scientific classification
- Kingdom: Plantae
- Clade: Tracheophytes
- Clade: Angiosperms
- Clade: Monocots
- Clade: Commelinids
- Order: Poales
- Family: Bromeliaceae
- Genus: Billbergia
- Subgenus: Billbergia subg. Helicodea
- Species: B. stenopetala

Binomial name
- Billbergia stenopetala Harms

Species of plant

Billbergia stenopetala is a species of flowering plant in the genus Billbergia. This species is native to Ecuador and Peru.

== Cultivars ==
- Billbergia 'Hirtz'
- Billbergia 'Sangre'
