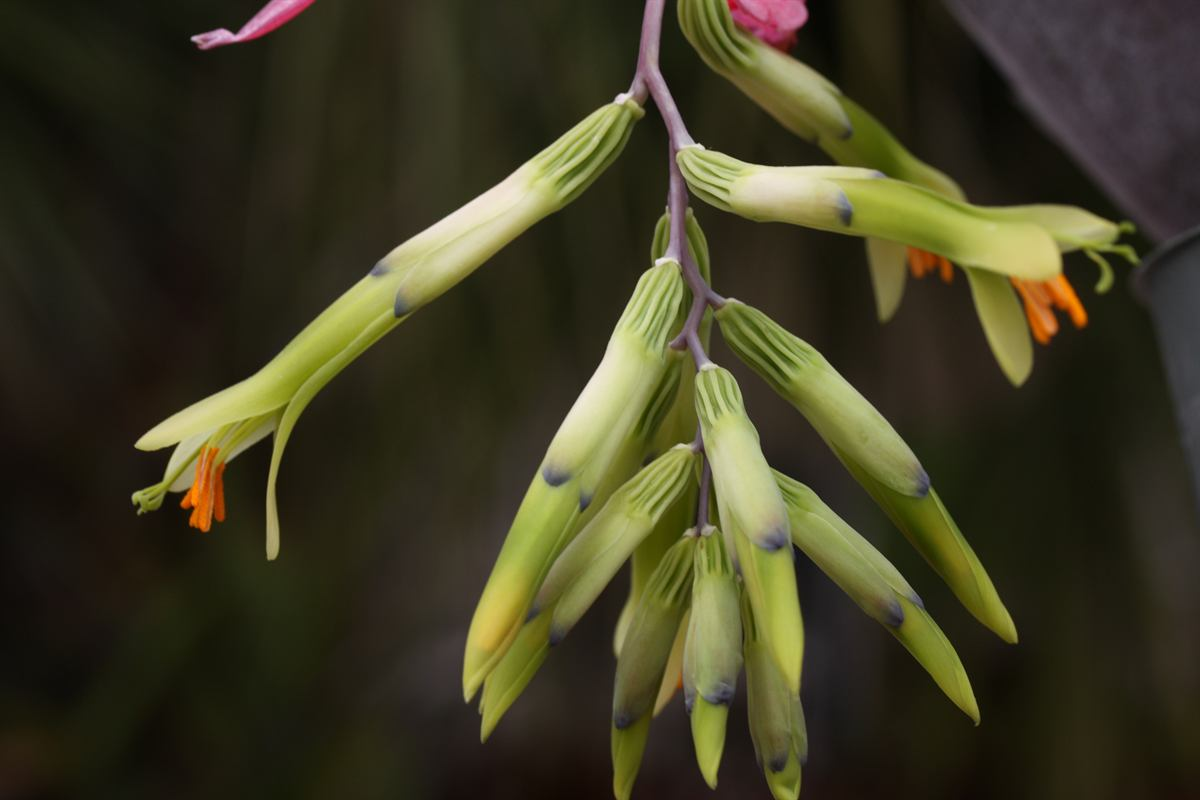

Scientific classification
- Kingdom: Plantae
- Clade: Tracheophytes
- Clade: Angiosperms
- Clade: Monocots
- Clade: Commelinids
- Order: Poales
- Family: Bromeliaceae
- Genus: Billbergia
- Subgenus: Billbergia subg. Billbergia
- Species: B. distachya

Binomial name
- Billbergia distachya (Vell.) Mez

= Billbergia distachya =

Species of flowering plant

Billbergia distachya is a plant species in the genus Billbergia. The species is native to Brazil.

== Cultivars ==
- Billbergia 'Albertii'
- Billbergia 'Conquistador'
- Billbergia 'Crimson Candle'
- Billbergia 'Fat Albert'
- Billbergia 'Fat Albert's Brother'
- Billbergia 'Grey Mist'
- Billbergia 'Misty Steel'
- Billbergia 'Pink Piglet'
- Billbergia 'Purple Haze'
- Billbergia 'Red Spot'
- Billbergia 'Smokey Rose'
- Billbergia 'Smokey Tricolor'
- Billbergia 'Stimpy'
- Billbergia 'White Spot'
