= Billbergia cylindrostachya =

Scientific classification
- Kingdom: Plantae
- Clade: Embryophytes
- Clade: Tracheophytes
- Clade: Spermatophytes
- Clade: Angiosperms
- Clade: Monocots
- Clade: Commelinids
- Order: Poales
- Family: Bromeliaceae
- Genus: Billbergia
- Subgenus: Billbergia subg. Helicodea
- Species: B. cylindrostachya

Binomial name
- Billbergia cylindrostachya Mez

Synonyms
- Heterotypic Synonyms: Billbergia maxima C.Chev.

Species of flowering plant

Billbergia cylindrostachya is a species of flowering plant in the family Bromeliaceae. This species is endemic to Brazil.

== Cultivars ==
- Billbergia 'Chevalieri'
