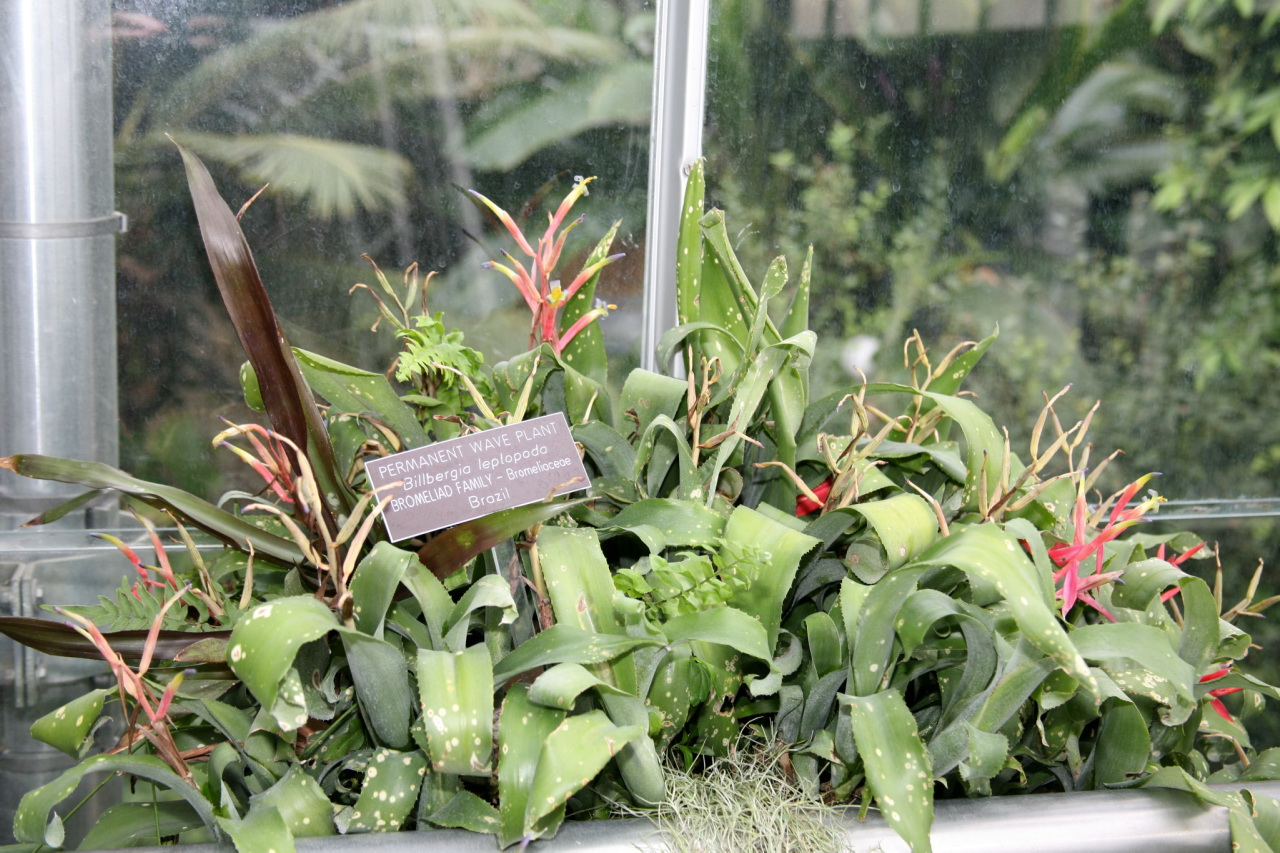

Scientific classification
- Kingdom: Plantae
- Clade: Tracheophytes
- Clade: Angiosperms
- Clade: Monocots
- Clade: Commelinids
- Order: Poales
- Family: Bromeliaceae
- Genus: Billbergia
- Subgenus: Billbergia subg. Billbergia
- Species: B. leptopoda

Binomial name
- Billbergia leptopoda L.B.Sm.

= Billbergia leptopoda =

Species of flowering plant

Billbergia leptopoda is a plant species in the genus Billbergia. This species is endemic to Brazil.

== Cultivars ==
- Billbergia 'Cold Fusion'
- Billbergia 'Curlew'
- Billbergia 'Curly Top'
- Billbergia 'Elfin'
- Billbergia 'Genevieve'
- Billbergia 'Harmony'
- Billbergia 'JCS'
- Billbergia 'Nez Misso'
- Billbergia 'Olive Baldwin'
- Billbergia 'Pink Surprise'
- Billbergia 'Raspberry Parfait'
- Billbergia 'Reward'
- Billbergia 'Samson'
- Billbergia 'Storm'
