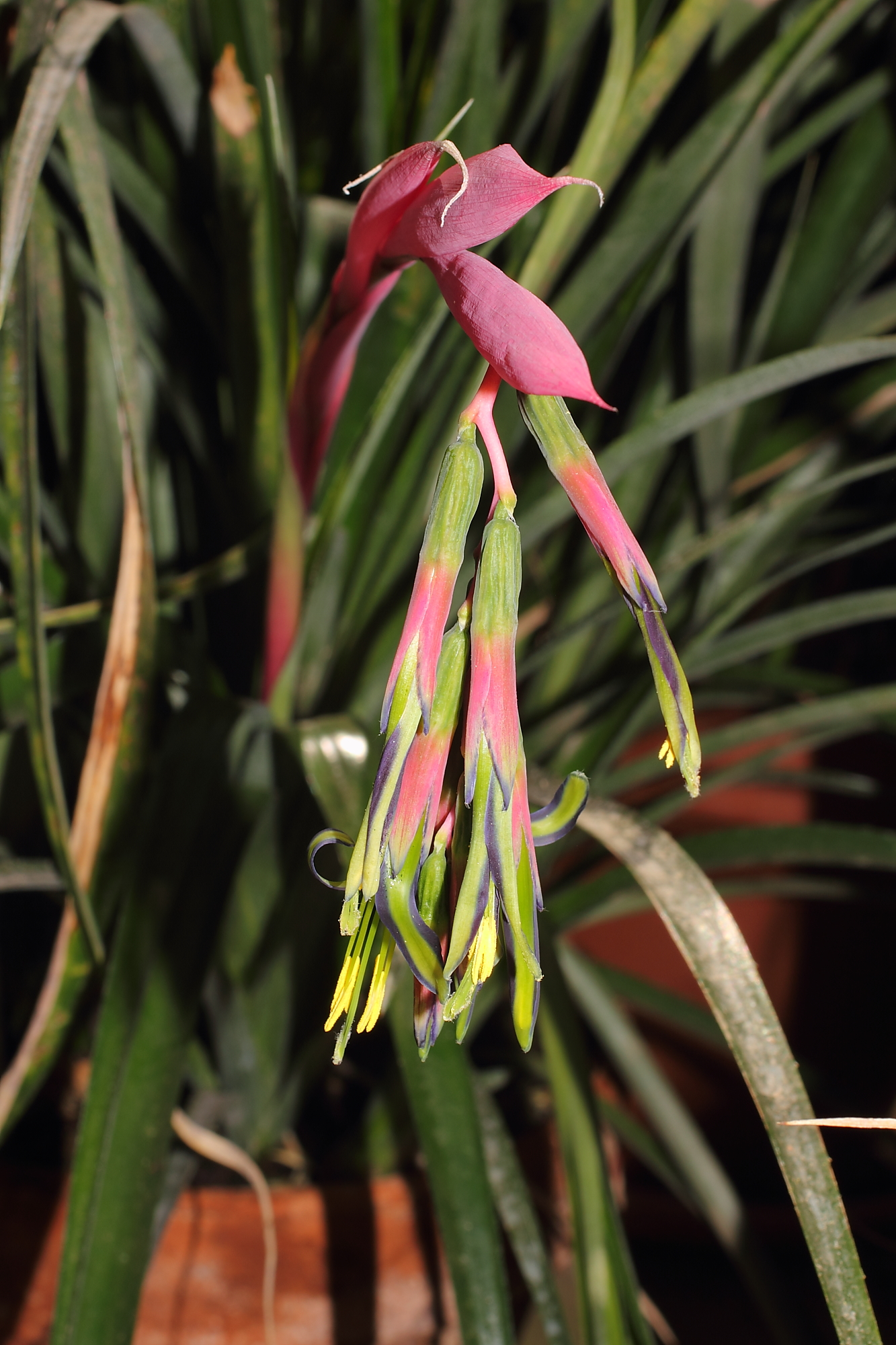

Scientific classification
- Kingdom: Plantae
- Clade: Tracheophytes
- Clade: Angiosperms
- Clade: Monocots
- Clade: Commelinids
- Order: Poales
- Family: Bromeliaceae
- Genus: Billbergia
- Subgenus: Billbergia subg. Helicodea
- Species: B. eloiseae

Binomial name
- Billbergia eloiseae L.B.Sm. & Read

= Billbergia eloiseae =

Species of flowering plant

Billbergia eloiseae is a species of flowering plant in the genus Billbergia. It is endemic to Colombia.

== Cultivars ==
- Billbergia 'Selby'
