= Billbergia brasiliensis =

Scientific classification
- Kingdom: Plantae
- Clade: Tracheophytes
- Clade: Angiosperms
- Clade: Monocots
- Clade: Commelinids
- Order: Poales
- Family: Bromeliaceae
- Genus: Billbergia
- Subgenus: Billbergia subg. Helicodea
- Species: B. brasiliensis

Binomial name
- Billbergia brasiliensis L.B.Sm.

Synonyms
- Billbergia leopoldii (Verschaff. ex Lem.) Linden ex Houllet, nom. illeg.; Helicodea leopoldii Verschaff. ex Lem; Billbergia ianthina É.Morren, nom. nud.; Billbergia kuhlmannii L.B.Sm.; Billbergia mohammadii R.Vásquez & Ibisch; Billbergia nuptialis É.Morren, nom. nud.; Billbergia velascana Cárdenas

Species of flowering plant

Billbergia brasiliensis is a species of flowering plant in the genus Billbergia. This species is native to Bolivia and Brazil.

== Cultivars ==
- Billbergia 'Desert Ripple'
- Billbergia 'Happy Days'
- Billbergia 'Hazy Purple'
- Billbergia 'Silversmith'
- Billbergia 'Silverson'
- Billbergia 'Titan'
- Billbergia 'Venesil'
- × Billmea 'Dolly'
