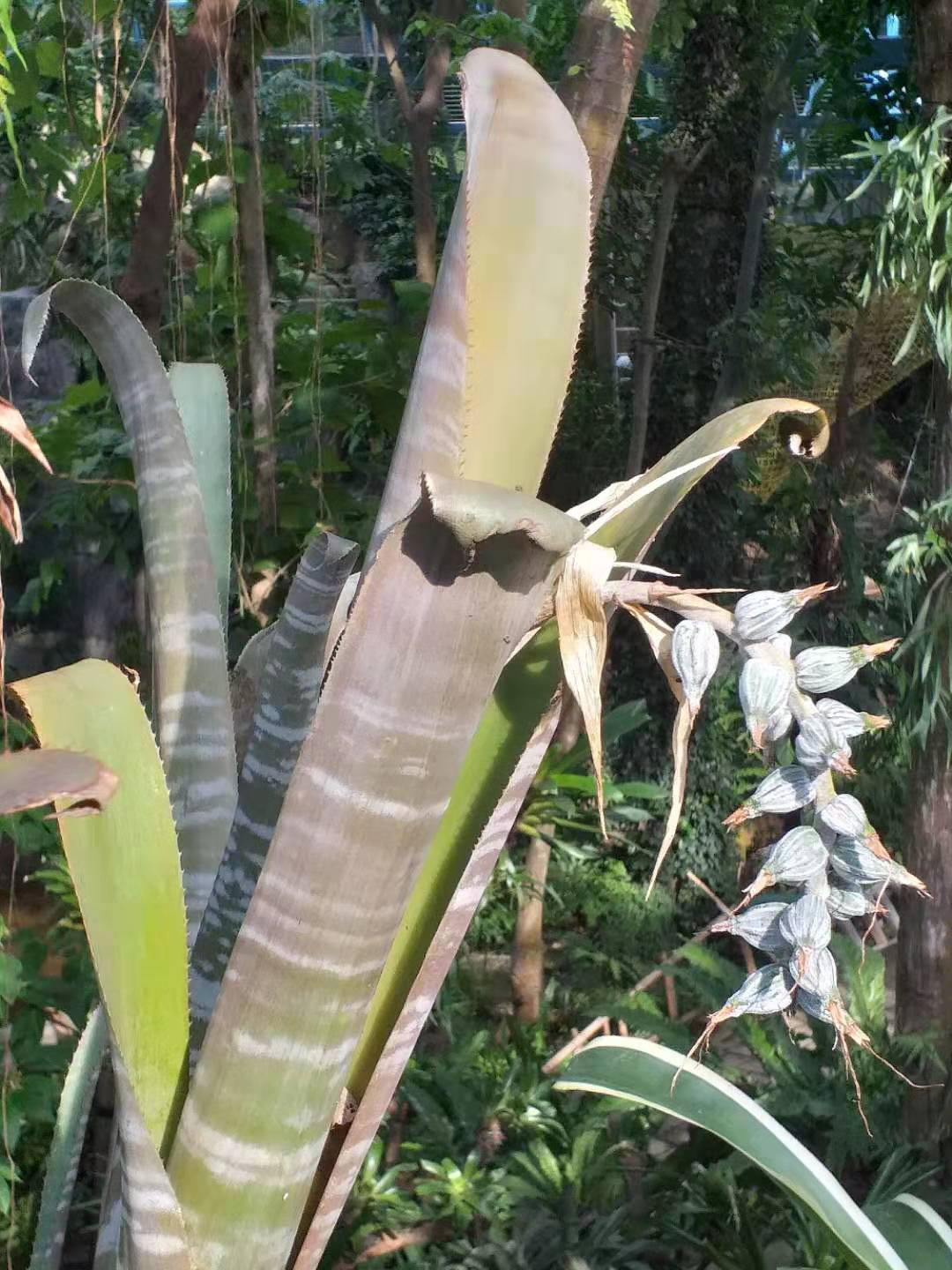

Scientific classification
- Kingdom: Plantae
- Clade: Tracheophytes
- Clade: Angiosperms
- Clade: Monocots
- Clade: Commelinids
- Order: Poales
- Family: Bromeliaceae
- Genus: Billbergia
- Subgenus: Billbergia subg. Billbergia
- Species: B. vittata

Binomial name
- Billbergia vittata Brongn. ex C.Morel

= Billbergia vittata =

Species of flowering plant

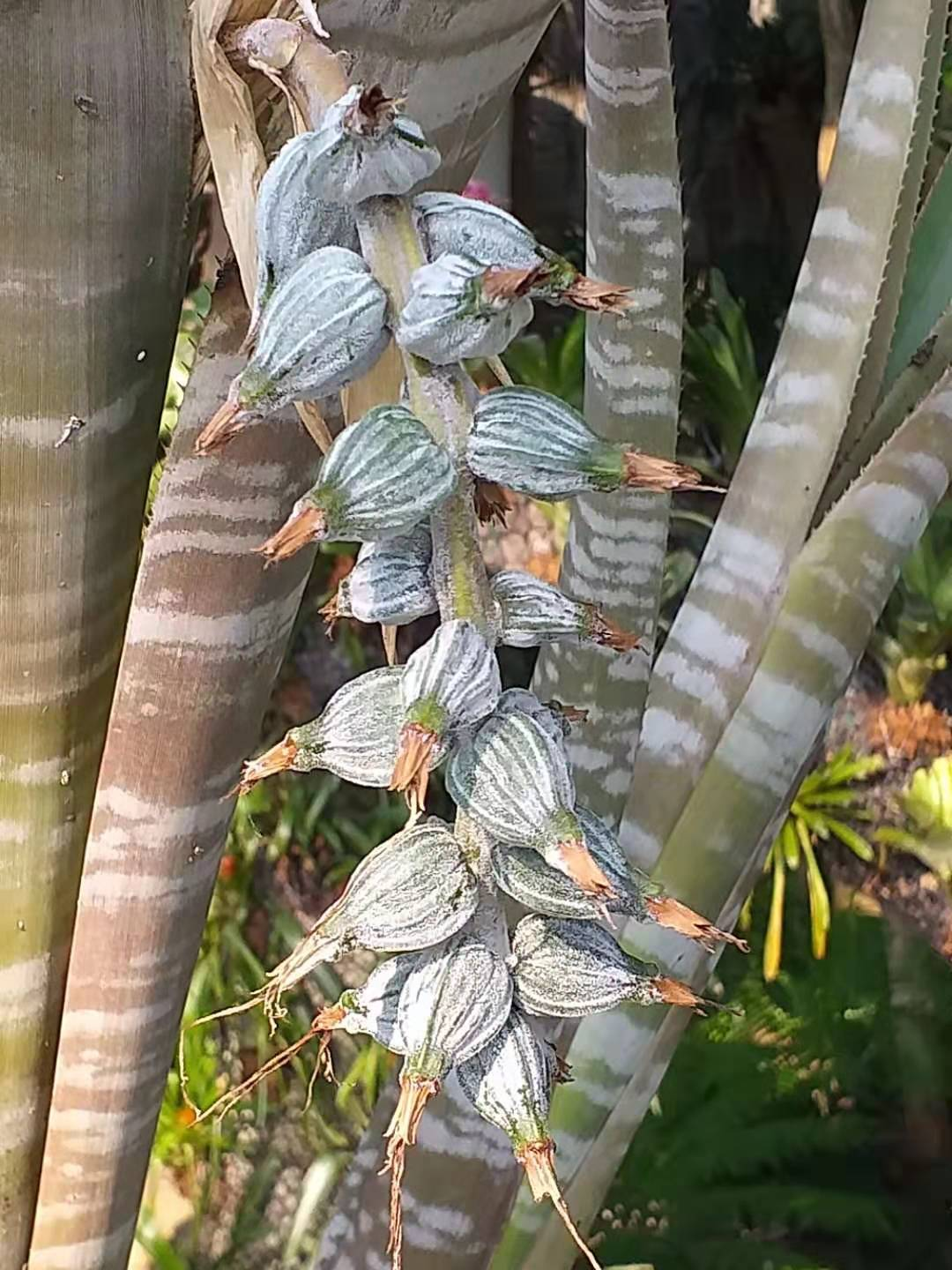
Fruit

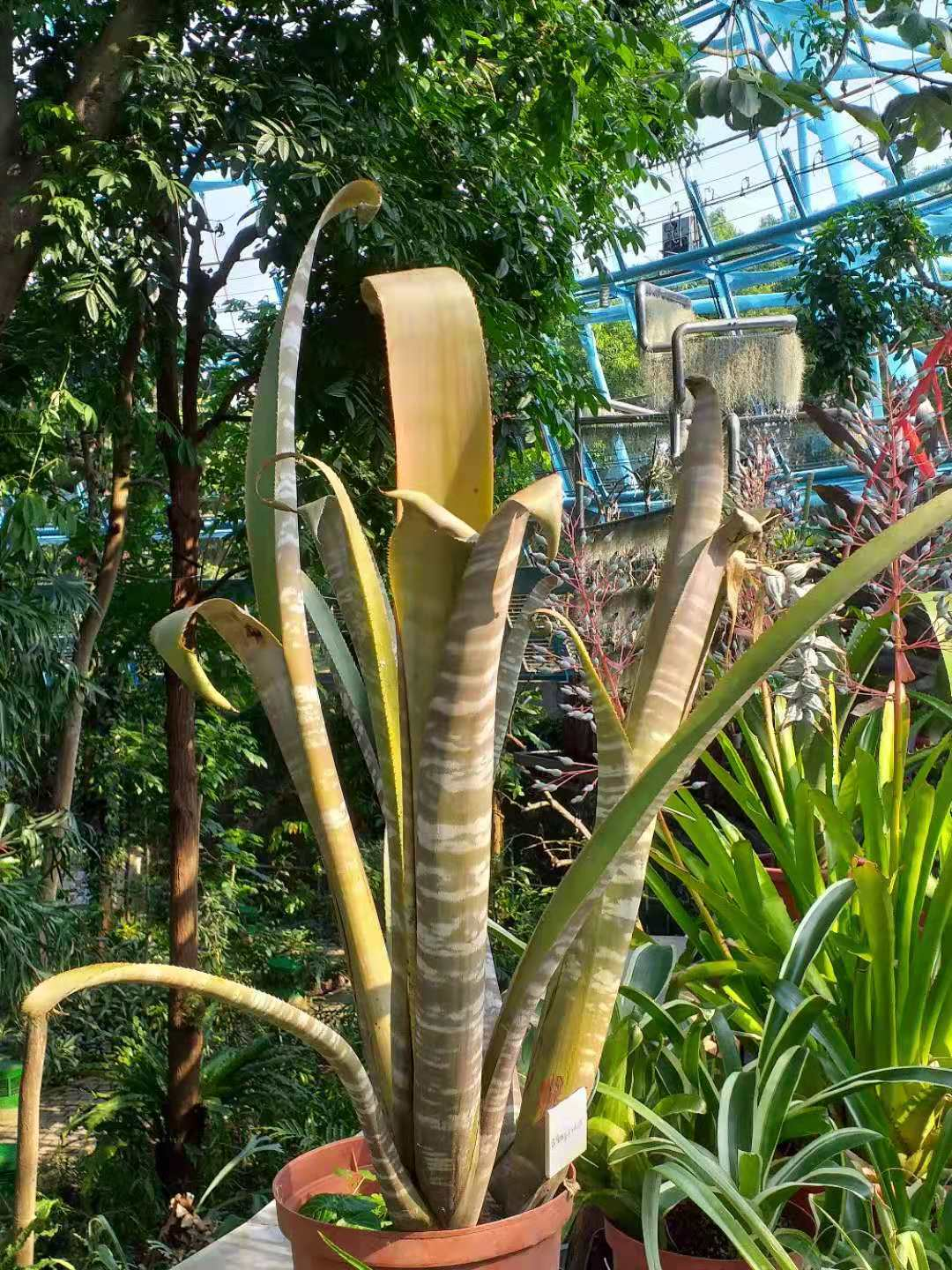
Plant

Billbergia vittata is a plant species in the family Bromeliaceae.

It is a tough hardy tubular shaped plant heavily festooned with silver trichomes in a distinctive banded pattern that boldly contrasts with the leaf pigments. The tube form is about 500 - 600mm high and retains a reservoir of water in the tube. The plant produces a brilliant red pink pendulous inflorescence with a series of small blue flowers, on whose nectar honey eaters such as the Eastern Spinebill feed.

This species is native to Brazil.

== Cultivars ==
- Billbergia 'Bismark'
- Billbergia 'Breauteana'
- Billbergia 'Calophylla'
- Billbergia 'Cappei'
- Billbergia 'Carminea'
- Billbergia 'Charles Webb'
- Billbergia 'Choc Chill'
- Billbergia 'Collevii'
- Billbergia 'Colores'
- Billbergia 'Dojo Master'
- Billbergia 'Domingos Martins'
- Billbergia 'El Jefe'
- Billbergia 'Franz Antoine'
- Billbergia 'Globrite'
- Billbergia 'Grey Mist'
- Billbergia 'Herbaultii'
- Billbergia 'Highlight'
- Billbergia 'Hilda Ariza'
- Billbergia 'Intermedia'
- Billbergia 'Joliboisii'
- Billbergia 'Joseph Marechal'
- Billbergia 'Lawrence'
- Billbergia 'Leodiensis'
- Billbergia 'Lissom'
- Billbergia 'Magic Grace'
- Billbergia 'Marechalii'
- Billbergia 'Medowie Dusk'
- Billbergia 'Misty Pink'
- Billbergia 'Misty Steel'
- Billbergia 'My Pleasure'
- Billbergia 'Oberthueri'
- Billbergia 'Olive Wills'
- Billbergia 'Penumbra'
- Billbergia 'Purple Smoke'
- Billbergia 'Raffle Prize'
- Billbergia 'Ralph Graham French'
- Billbergia 'Red Smoke'
- Billbergia 'Rhedonensis'
- Billbergia 'Rosea'
- Billbergia 'Salmon Gum'
- Billbergia 'Salmonea'
- Billbergia 'Silver Sheen'
- Billbergia 'Smoke & Fire'
- Billbergia 'Storm'
- Billbergia 'Touch of Grey'
- Billbergia 'Turbo'
- Billbergia 'Ultrajactensis'
- Billbergia 'Vittato-Nutans'
- Billbergia 'Wind & Thunder'
- Billbergia 'Windtalker'
- Billbergia 'Wittmackiana'
- Billbergia 'Zebrina Cappeana'
- × Cryptbergia 'Hombre'
