= Billbergia tweedieana =

Scientific classification
- Kingdom: Plantae
- Clade: Tracheophytes
- Clade: Angiosperms
- Clade: Monocots
- Clade: Commelinids
- Order: Poales
- Family: Bromeliaceae
- Genus: Billbergia
- Subgenus: Billbergia subg. Billbergia
- Species: B. tweedieana

Binomial name
- Billbergia tweedieana Baker

Synonyms
- Billbergia decipiens E.Pereira & Reitz

Species of flowering plant

Billbergia tweedieana is a species of flowering plant in the Bromeliaceae family. This species is endemic to southeastern Brazil.

Three varieties are recognized:

1. Billbergia tweedieana var. latisepala L.B.Sm. – Rio de Janeiro
2. Billbergia tweedieana var. minor L.B.Sm. – Espírito Santo
3. Billbergia tweedieana var. tweedieana – Espírito Santo and Rio de Janeiro
