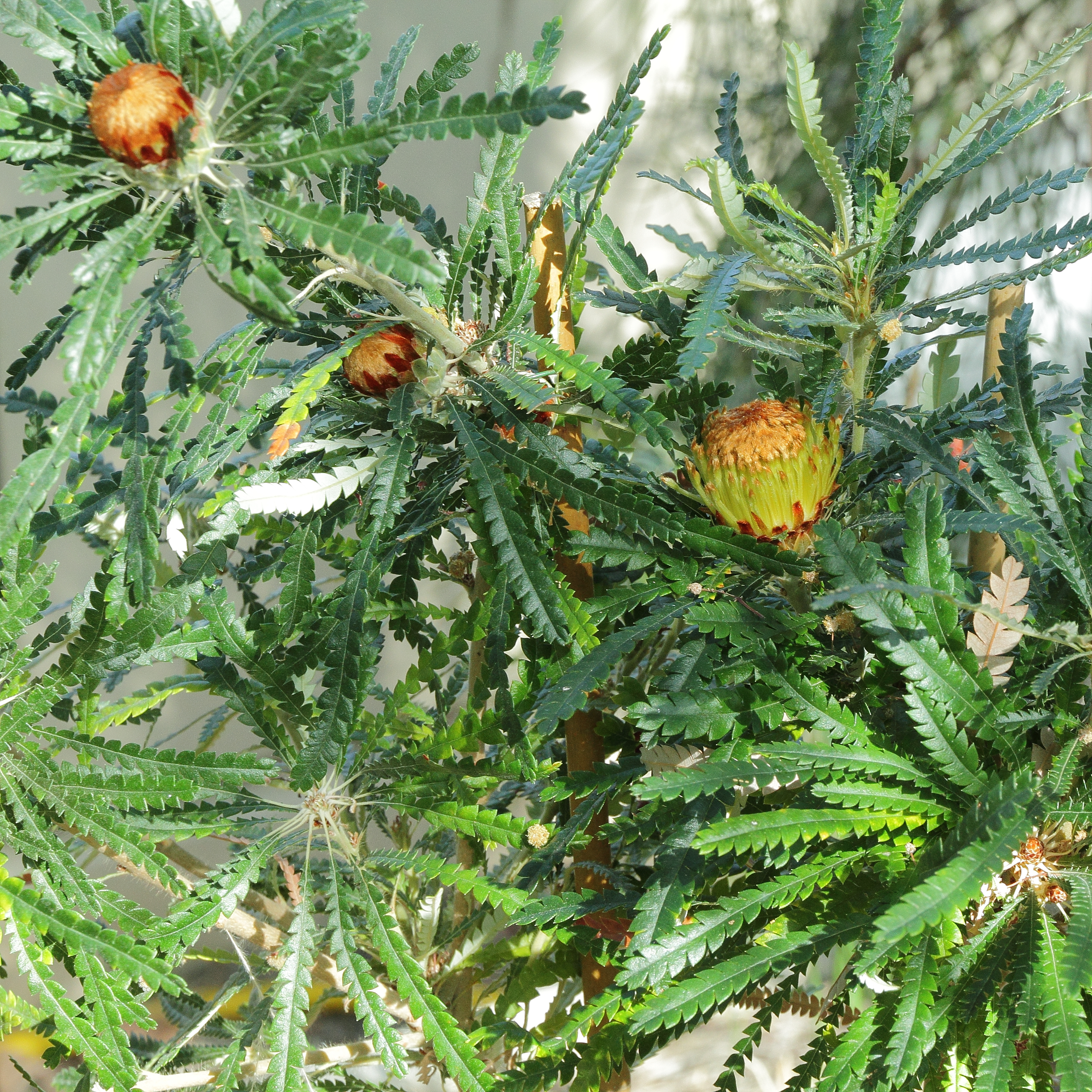
- Flowers and foliage

Conservation status
- Near Threatened (IUCN 3.1)

Scientific classification
- Kingdom: Plantae
- Clade: Tracheophytes
- Clade: Angiosperms
- Clade: Eudicots
- Order: Proteales
- Family: Proteaceae
- Genus: Banksia
- Subgenus: Banksia subg. Banksia
- Series: Banksia ser. Dryandra
- Species: B. formosa

Binomial name
- Banksia formosa (R.Br.) A.R.Mast & K.R.Thiele

Synonyms
- Dryandra formosa R.Br.; Josephia formosa (R.Br.) Poir.

= Banksia formosa =

Showy dryandra

Species of shrub endemic to Western Australia

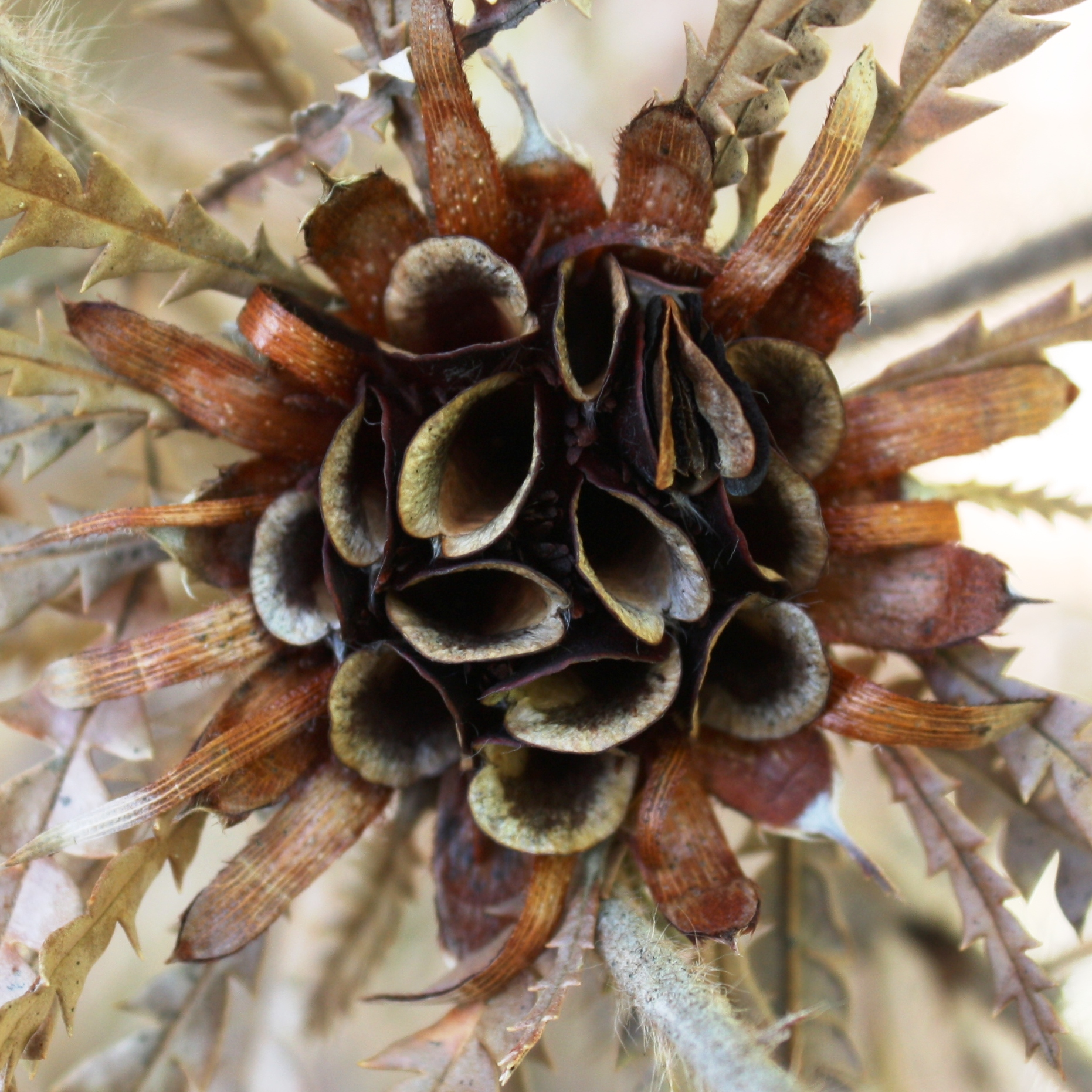
Old flower head with open follicles

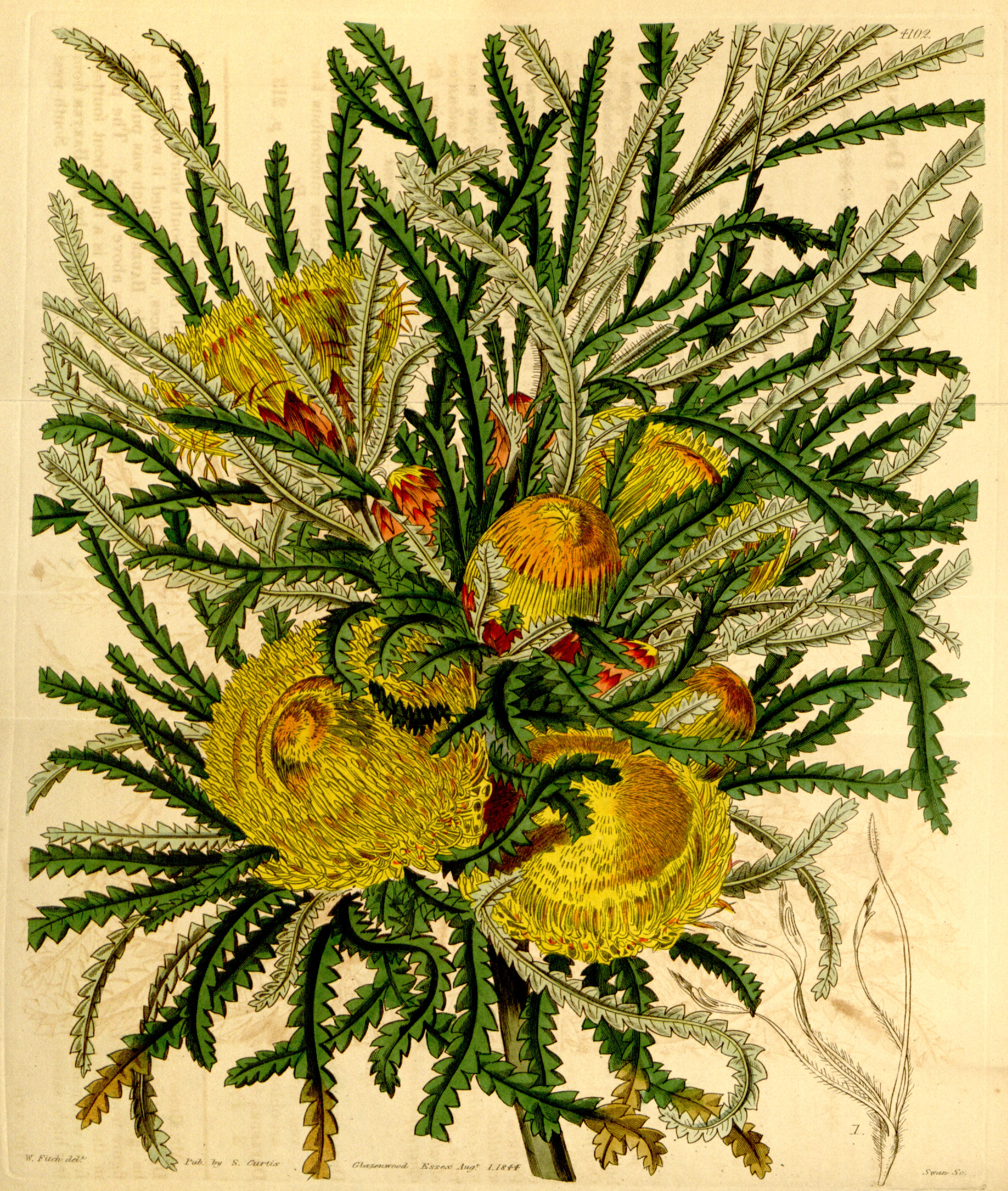
Botanical illustration from Curtis's Botanical Magazine

Banksia formosa, commonly known as showy dryandra, is a species of shrub that is endemic to the south-west of Western Australia. It has pinnatipartite leaves with up to forty triangular lobes on each side, up to more than two hundred, conspicuous golden orange flowers and up to sixteen egg-shaped follicles in each head.

== Description ==
Banksia formosa is an erect shrub that typically grows to a height of 1–3 m (3 ft 3 in – 9 ft 10 in) but does not form a lignotuber. It has hairy branchlets and leaves that are broadly linear in outline, pinnatipartite, 70–160 mm (2.8–6.3 in) long and 6–11 mm (0.24–0.43 in) wide on a petiole 2–3 mm (0.079–0.118 in) long. There are between thirty and forty-five more or less triangular lobes on each side of the leaves. The flowers are borne on a head containing between 100 and 220 flowers in each head. There are oblong to egg-shaped involucral bracts 16–20 mm (0.63–0.79 in) long at the base of the head. The flowers have a golden orange perianth 25–39 mm (0.98–1.54 in) long and a yellow pistil 29–55 mm (1.1–2.2 in) long. Flowering occurs in May or from September to December and the fruit is a glabrous follicle 11–13 mm (0.43–0.51 in) long. Each head may have up to thirteen follicles.

== Taxonomy and naming ==
This species was first formally described in 1810 by Robert Brown who gave it the name Dryandra formosa and published the description in the Transactions of the Linnean Society of London.

In 2007, Austin Mast and Kevin Thiele transferred all the dryandras to the genus Banksia and this species became Banksia formosa. The specific epithet (formosa) is a Latin word meaning "beautiful on account of form".

== Distribution and habitat ==
Banksia formosa grows in kwongan and open forest between Busselton and Two Peoples Bay Nature Reserve and is common near Albany and in the Stirling Range.

== Ecology ==
An assessment of the potential impact of climate change on this species found that its range is likely to contract by between 50% and 80% by 2080, depending on the severity of the change.
