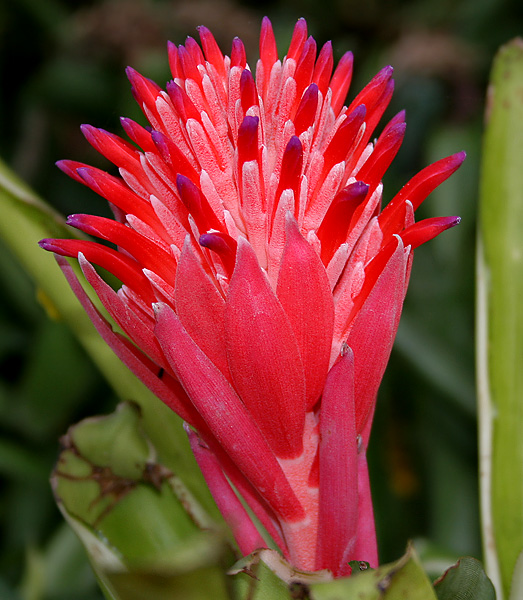

Scientific classification
- Kingdom: Plantae
- Clade: Tracheophytes
- Clade: Angiosperms
- Clade: Monocots
- Clade: Commelinids
- Order: Poales
- Family: Bromeliaceae
- Genus: Billbergia
- Subgenus: Billbergia subg. Billbergia
- Species: B. pyramidalis

Binomial name
- Billbergia pyramidalis (Sims) Lindl.

Synonyms
- Bromelia pyramidalis Sims; Billbergia thyrsoidea Mart. ex Schult. & Schult.f.; Tillandsia farinosa Schult. & Schult.f.; Billbergia atrorosea Drapiez; Billbergia loddigesii Steud.; Pitcairnia fastuosa C.Morren; Billbergia splendida Lem.; Jonghea splendida Lem.; Billbergia croyana De Jonghe ex Lem.; Billbergia miniatorosea Lem.; Billbergia fastuosa (C.Morren) Beer; Billbergia longifolia K.Koch & C.D.Bouché; Billbergia paxtonii Beer; Billbergia punicea Beer; Billbergia lemoinei André; Billbergia andegavensis André; Billbergia schultesiana Baker; Billbergia setosa Baker

= Billbergia pyramidalis =

Flaming torch

Species of flowering plant

Billbergia pyramidalis, commonly known as the flaming torch and foolproof plant, is a species of bromeliad that is native to northern South America and parts of the Caribbean. It was first described by John Sims, and got its current name by John Lindley.

== Description ==
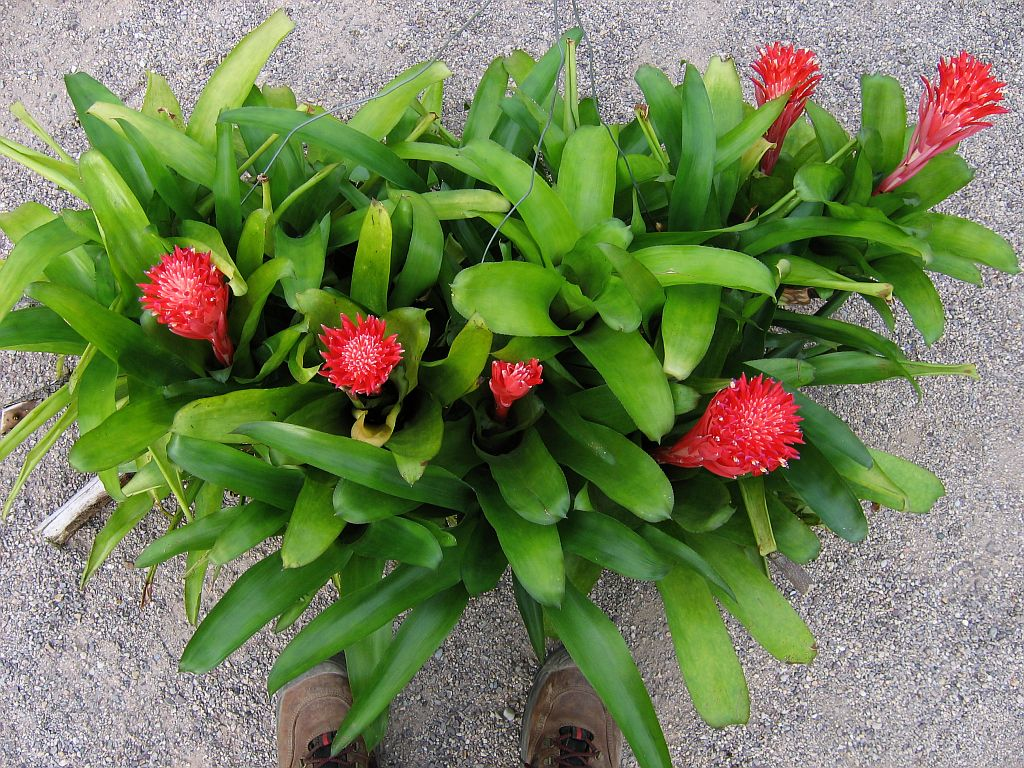
Billbergia pyramidalis var. concolor in cultivation

A perennial, clump-forming stemless bromeliad plant, it is adaptable, growing well as a terrestrial or epiphytic plant. When on the ground, plants quickly create large clumps, and when planted at the base of a tree, they will slowly climb the trunk. The strap-like, green-coloured, overlaying, leathery leaves are arranged in jar-shaped basal rosettes, with a central cup that keeps water, organic debris and insects, thus providing extra nutrients to be absorbed by the plant.

=== Inflorescences ===
The thick, red or pink brush-shaped flowers on an individual plant last less than one month, but nearly all plants will come into bloom at the same time in the late summer or early autumn. In some latitudes, they bloom more frequently. The scarlet-coloured, erect, pyramidal flowers are laid in thistle-like inflorescences, which are made up of red, tube-shaped flowers with violet or yellow highlights.

== Cultivation ==
Requiring minimal care, the plant is used as groundcover in partial shade and in a protected position. It is drought and frost sensitive. Being epiphytic, these plants can also be grown in the branching of trees or on tree ferns. A slow-release fertiliser may be applied on the base of the plants in spring. Propagation is done by dividing off the immature parts of the plants in spring or autumn. This plant tolerates between USDA zones 10a to 12a and may not withstand temperatures below −1.1 °C.

== Range ==
The species is found in moist humus rich soils or in composted leaf mould on the ground in humid areas, and as well as on rocks under shady forest trees, in countries such as, Cuba, Venezuela, Brazil, French Guiana, the Lesser Antilles and Cuba. It is reportedly naturalised in Puerto Rico, the Dominican Republic and on the Island of Mauritius in the Indian Ocean.

== Cultivars ==
- Billbergia pyramidalis var. bicolor Lindl.
- Billbergia pyramidalis var. concolor L.B.Sm.
- Billbergia pyramidalis var. croyana E.Morren
- Billbergia pyramidalis var. farinosa E.Morren
- Billbergia pyramidalis var. lutea Leme & W. Weber
- Billbergia pyramidalis var. pyramidalis
- Billbergia pyramidalis var. striata M.B.Foster
- Billbergia pyramidalis var. vernicosa E.Pereira
- Billbergia pyramidalis var. zonata (from Vriese) E. Morren

== Gallery ==
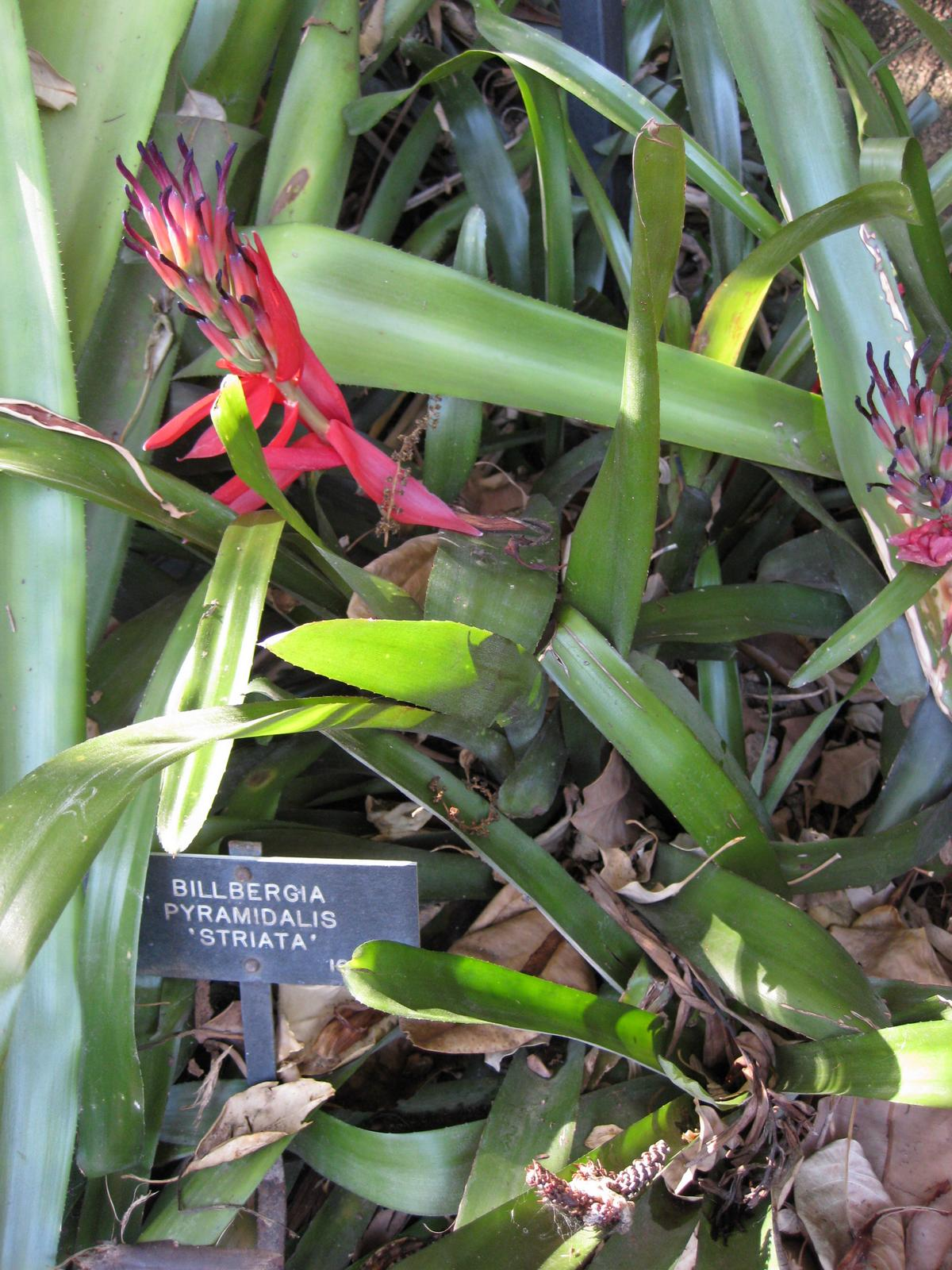
Huntington Gardens, Los Angeles

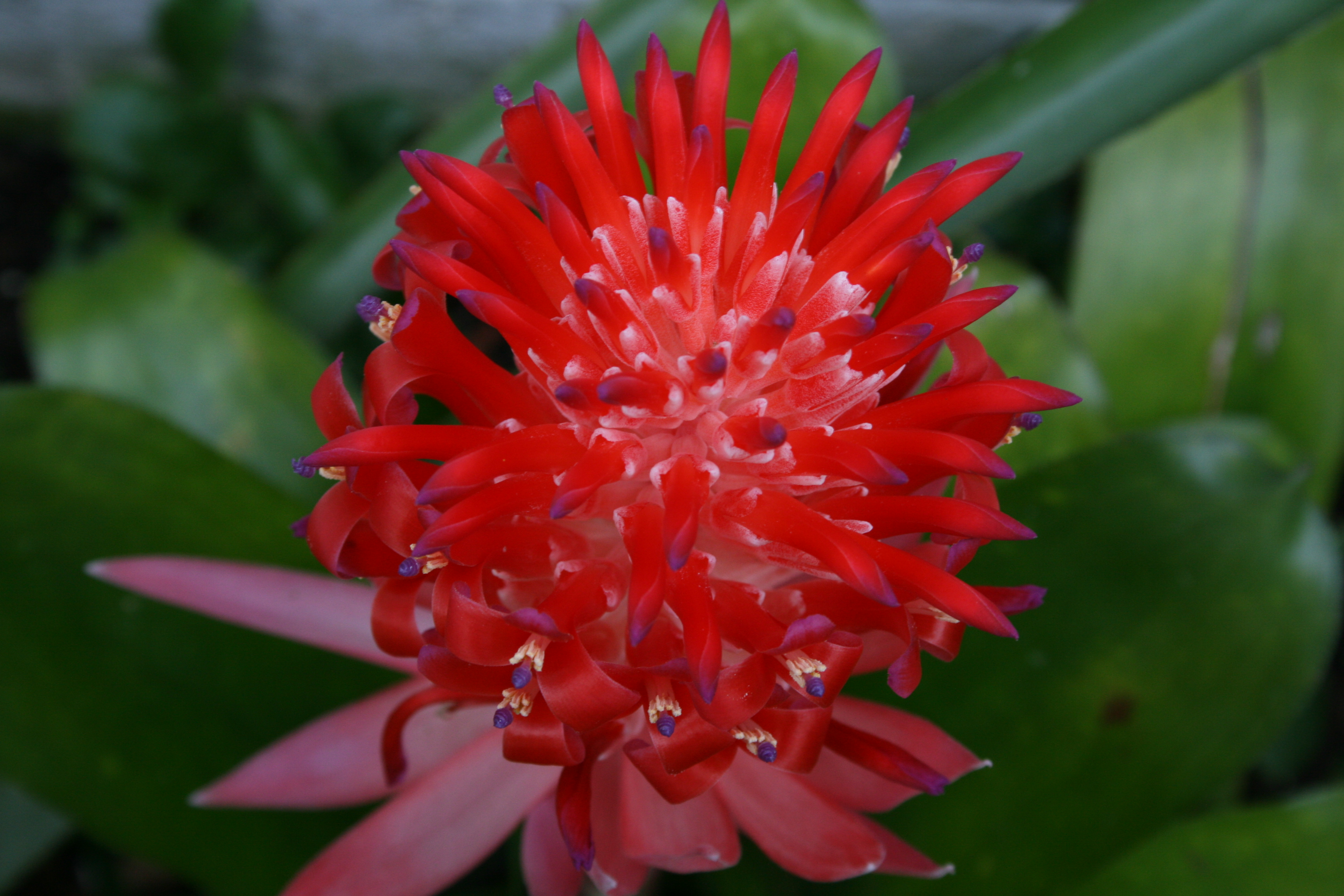
Red rosette with violet highlights

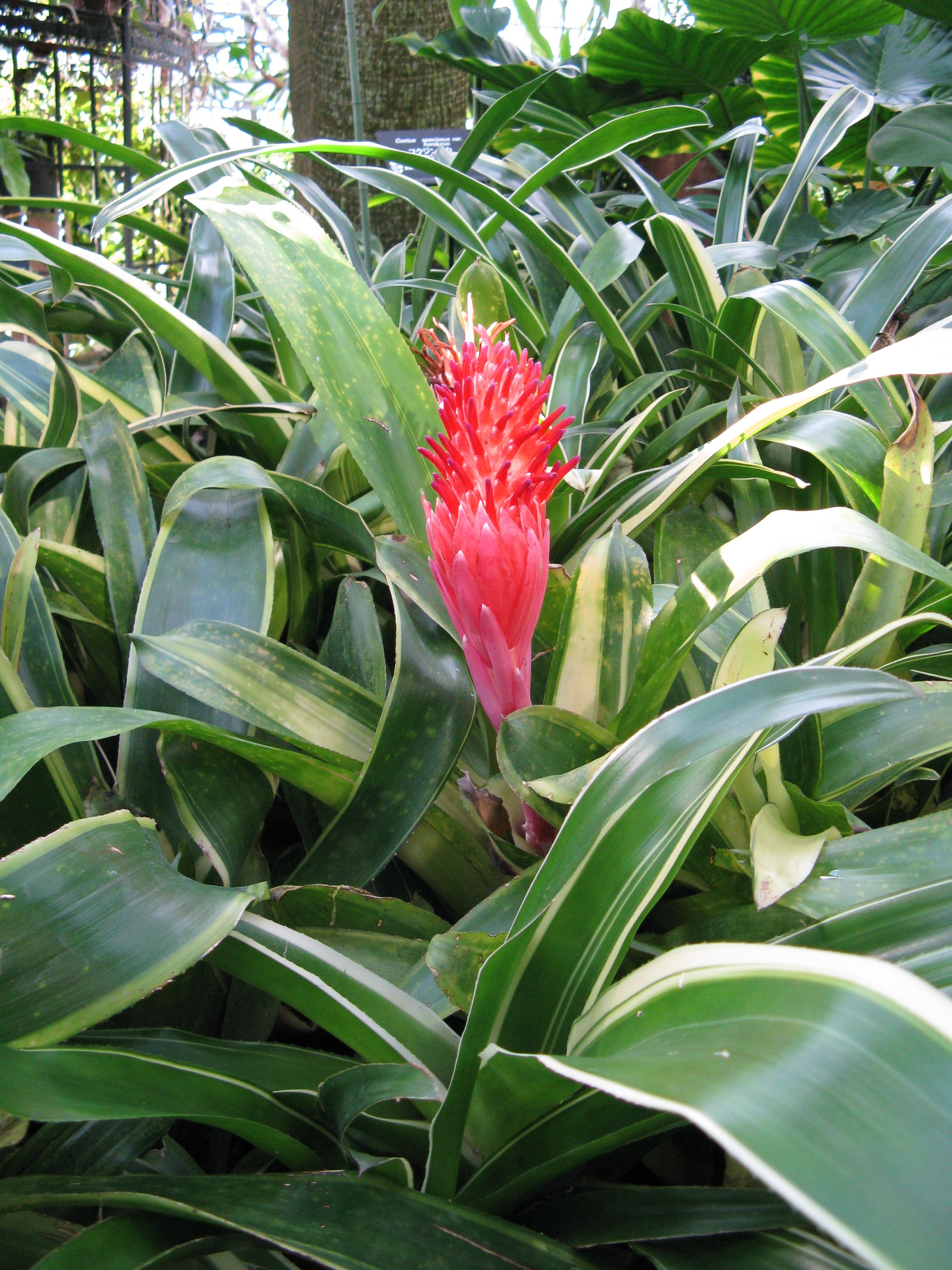
Its clumpy characteristic

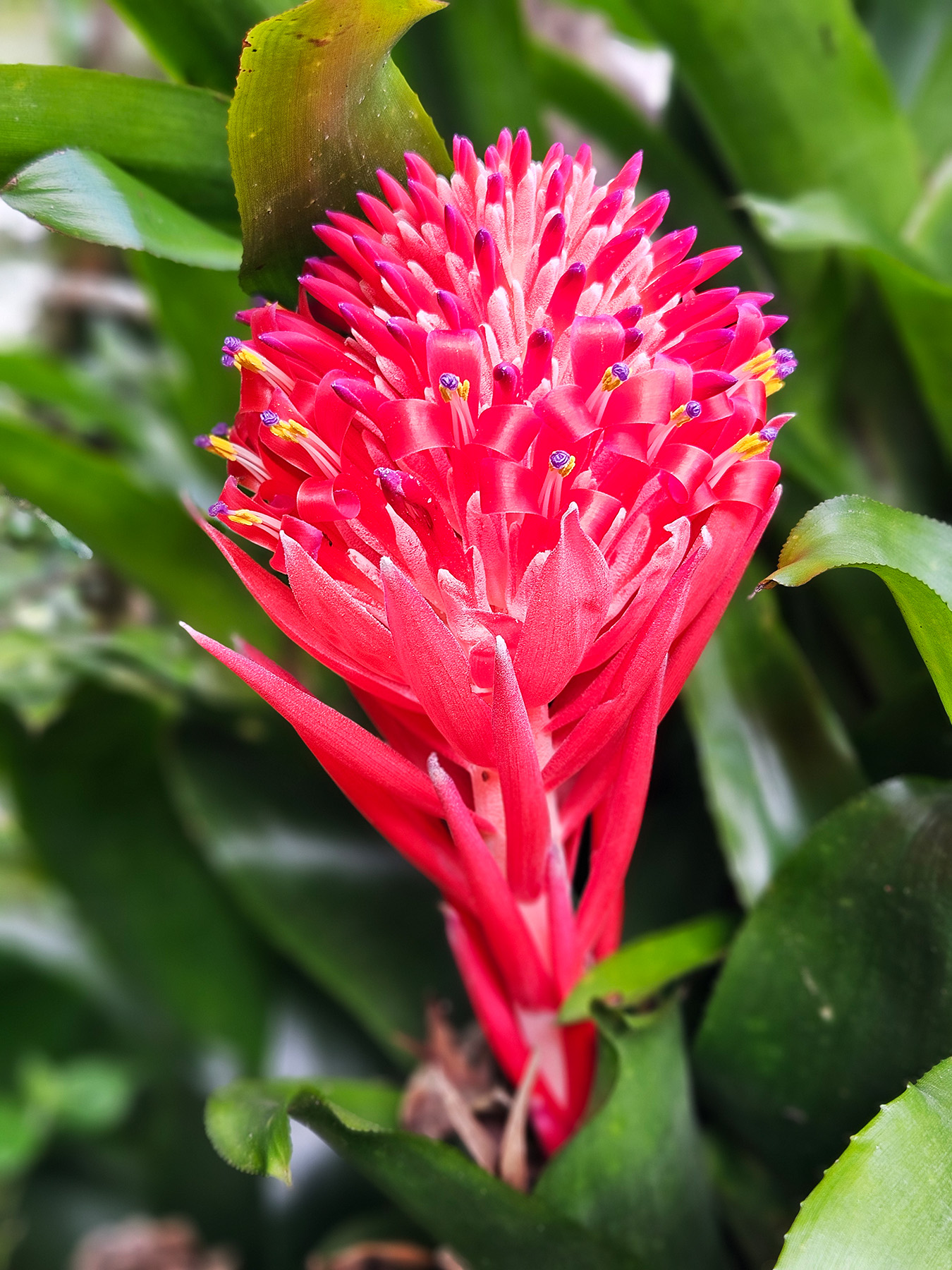
Billbergia pyramidalis (Sims) Lindl. (Hawaii)

== See also ==
- Guzmania, a genus of the same family with similar-looking plants
