= Billbergia formosa =

Scientific classification
- Kingdom: Plantae
- Clade: Tracheophytes
- Clade: Angiosperms
- Clade: Monocots
- Clade: Commelinids
- Order: Poales
- Family: Bromeliaceae
- Genus: Billbergia
- Subgenus: Billbergia subg. Helicodea
- Species: B. formosa

Binomial name
- Billbergia formosa Ule

Species of plant

Billbergia formosa is a species of flowering plant in the genus Billbergia. It is endemic to Peru but cultivated elsewhere as an ornamental. The species is very rare in the wild and listed as endangered.

== Cultivars ==
- Billbergia 'Caroliniana'
- Billbergia 'Wallonia'
