= Dryandra ser. Ilicinae =

Obsolete series of plants

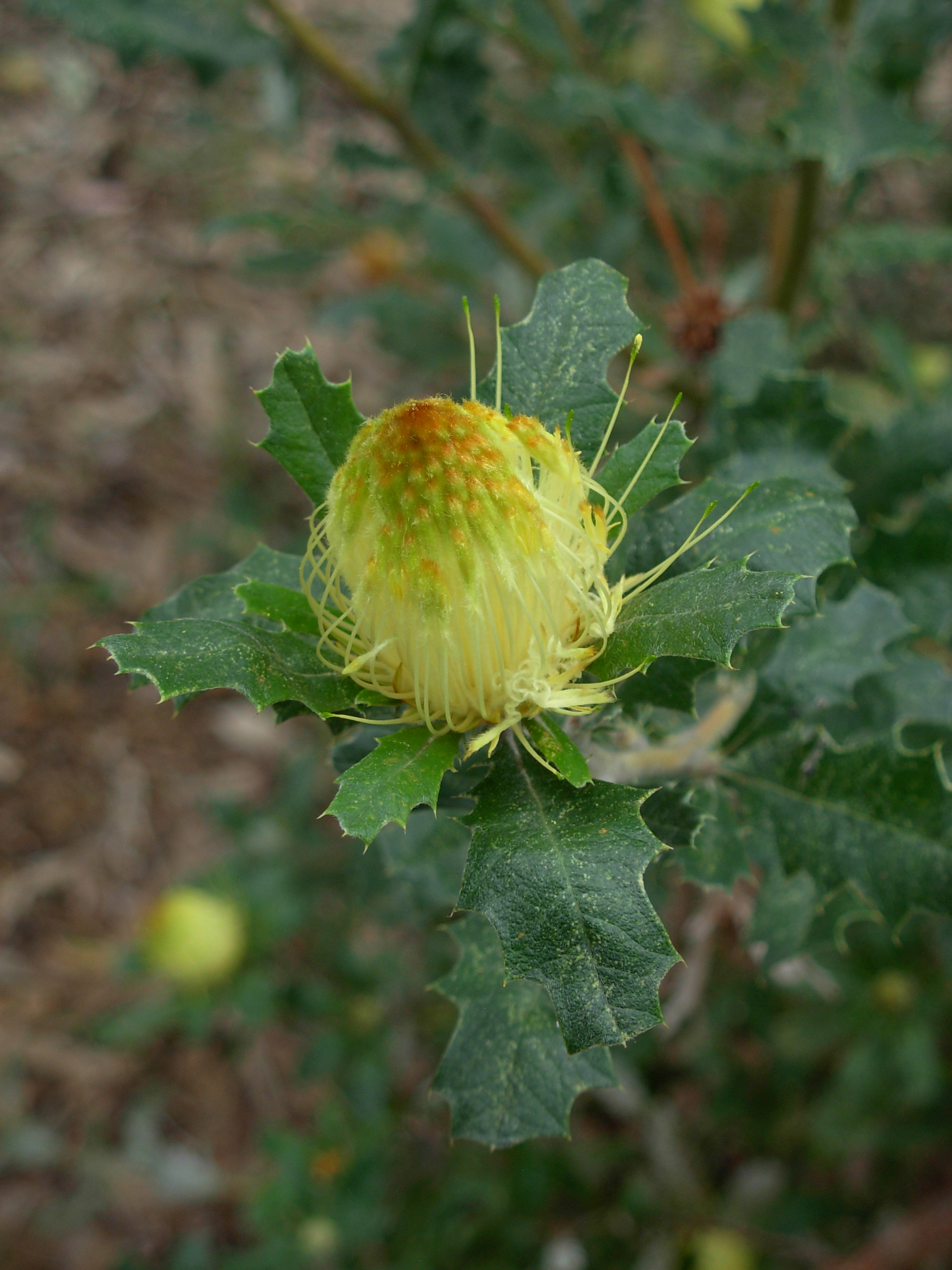
Inflorescence of Banksia undata, the type species of Dryandra ser. Ilicinae

Dryandra ser. Ilicinae is an obsolete series within the former genus Dryandra (now Banksia ser. Dryandra). It was first published by Carl Meissner in 1856, but was discarded by George Bentham in 1870. It was reinstated with a new circumscription by Alex George in 1996, but was ultimately discarded again in 2007 when Austin Mast and Kevin Thiele sunk Dryandra into Banksia.

== According to Meissner ==
This taxon was first published by Meissner in his 1856 chapter on the Proteaceae in A. P. de Candolle's Prodromus systematis naturalis regni vegetabilis.. Meissner's arrangement followed that of Robert Brown in segregating a single species into the genus Hemiclidia, and dividing the remaining species into three sections according to what were perceived to be variations in the number of seed separators. Meissner then further divided D. sect. Eudryandra into eight unranked groups signified by the symbol "§". The first of these, Dryandra § Ilicinae, was defined as comprising four species with leaves resembling those of Ilex (Holly). The placement and circumscription of D. § Ilicinae in Meissner's arrangement thus looks like this:

Dryandra (now Banksia ser. Dryandra)

D. sect. Eudryandra (8 series, 47 species, 7 varieties)

D. § Ilicinae

D. praemorsa (now B. undata)

D. praemorsa var. elongata (now B. undata var. undata)

D. quercifolia (now B. heliantha)
D. cuneata (now B. obovata)
D. floribunda (now B. sessilis var. sessilis)

D. floribunda var. cordata (now B. sessilis var. cordata)

D. § Runcinatae (5 species)
D. § Serratae (11 species, 3 varieties)
D. § Marginatae (7 species)
D. § Pectinatae (6 species)
D. § Decurrentes (11 species)
D. § Acrodontae (2 species)
D. § Haplophyllae (1 species)

D. sect. Diplophragma (2 species)
D. sect. Aphragma (4 species, 4 varieties)

Hemiclidia (1 species)

== According to Bentham ==
Along with many of Meissner's infrageneric taxa, which were overly reliant on leaf characters, Bentham discarded D. § Ilicinae in his 1870 arrangement. The species that Meissner placed there were placed together in D. ser. Armatae, except for D. floribunda (now Banksia sessilis) which Bentham placed in D. ser. Floribundae.

== According to George ==
When Alex George published his revision of Dryandra in 1996, he recycled number of previously published infrageneral names, including Meissner's Ilicinae. George gave it series rank and placed it within D. subg. Dryandra. It was circumscribed as containing three species: D. praemorsa (now B. undata), D. quercifolia (now B. heliantha) and D. anatona (now B. anatona).

George's placement and circumscription of D. ser. Ilicinae, as amended in 1999 and 2005, may be summarised as follows:

Dryandra (now Banksia ser. Dryandra)

D. subg. Dryandra

D. ser. Floribundae (1 species, 4 varieties)
D. ser. Armatae (21 species, 7 subspecies, 4 varieties)
D. ser. Marginatae (1 species)
D. ser. Folliculosae (1 species, 5 varieties)
D. ser. Acrodontae (4 species, 2 varieties)
D. ser. Capitellatae (2 species, 2 subspecies)
D. ser. Ilicinae

D. praemorsa (now B. undata)

D. praemorsa var. praemorsa (now B. undata var. undata)
D. praemorsa var. splendens (now B. undata var. splendens)

D. quercifolia (now B. heliantha)
D. anatona (now B. anatona)

D. ser. Dryandra (3 species, 2 subspecies)
D. ser. Foliosae (3 species, 2 subspecies)
D. ser. Decurrentes (1 species)
D. ser. Tenuifoliae (2 species, 2 varieties)
D. ser. Runcinatae (4 species, 7 subspecies)
D. ser. Triangulares (3 species, 3 subspecies)
D. ser. Aphragma (9 species, 3 subspecies)
D. ser. Ionthocarpae (1 species, 2 subspecies)
D. ser. Inusitatae (1 species)
D. ser. Subulatae (1 species)
D. ser. Gymnocephalae (11 species, 4 subspecies, 2 varieties)
D. ser. Concinnae (3 species)
D. ser. Obvallatae (7 species, 2 varieties)
D. ser. Pectinatae (1 species)
D. ser. Acuminatae (1 species)
D. ser. Niveae (7 species, 7 subspecies)

D. subg. Hemiclidia (2 species)
D. subg. Diplophragma (1 species)

== Recent developments ==
Since 1998, Austin Mast has been publishing results of ongoing cladistic analyses of DNA sequence data for the subtribe Banksiinae. His analyses have provided compelling evidence of the paraphyly of Banksia with respect to Dryandra; that is, it seems that Dryandra arose from within the ranks of Banksia. Early in 2007, Mast and Kevin Thiele initiated a rearrangement of Banksia by sinking Dryandra into it as B. ser. Dryandra. This transfer necessitated the setting aside of George's infrageneric arrangement of Dryandra; thus D. ser. Armatae is no longer current. Mast and Thiele have foreshadowed publishing a full arrangement once DNA sampling of Dryandra is complete.
