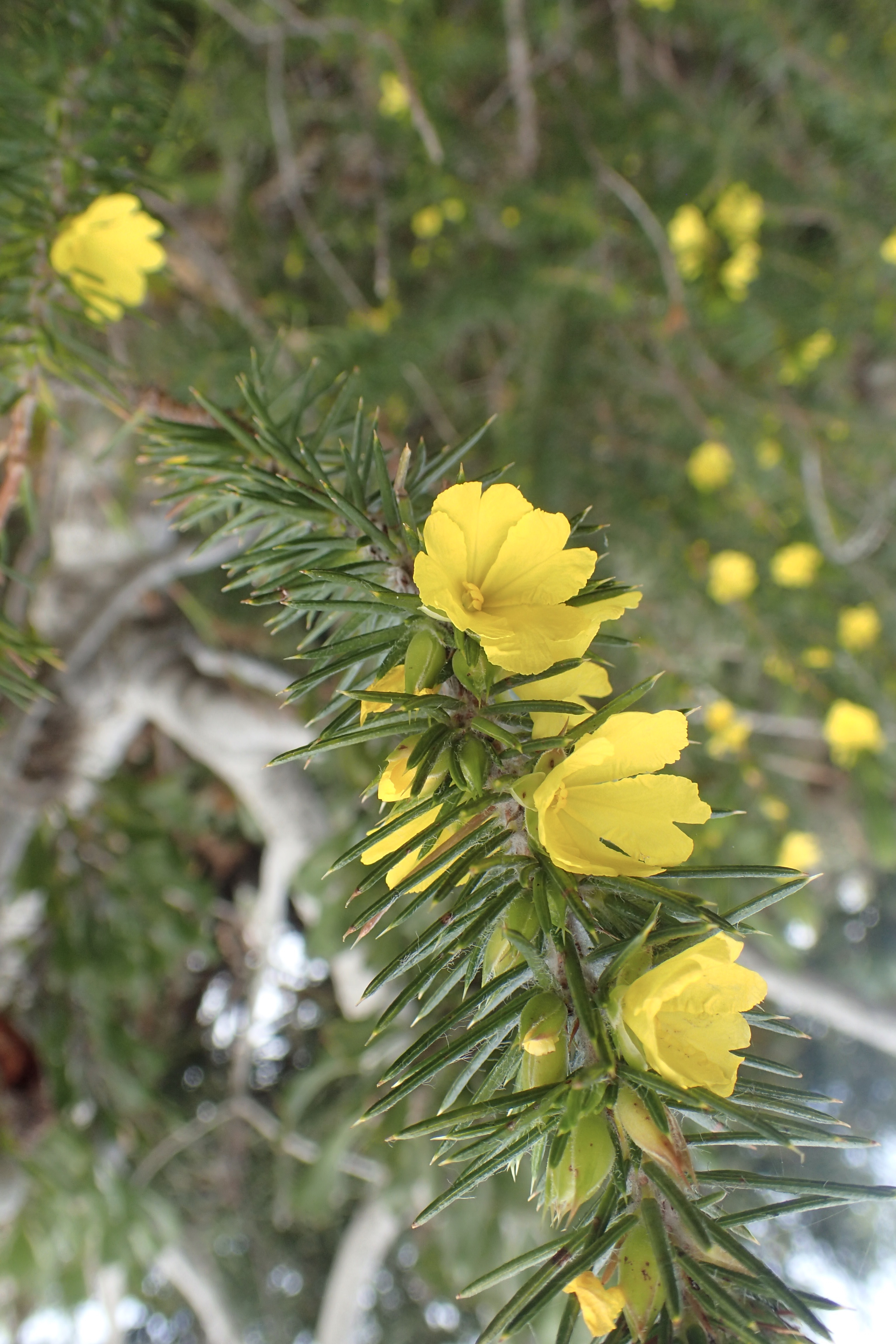

Scientific classification
- Kingdom: Plantae
- Clade: Tracheophytes
- Clade: Angiosperms
- Clade: Eudicots
- Order: Dilleniales
- Family: Dilleniaceae
- Genus: Hibbertia
- Species: H. hamulosa

Binomial name
- Hibbertia hamulosa J.R.Wheeler

= Hibbertia hamulosa =

Species of flowering plant

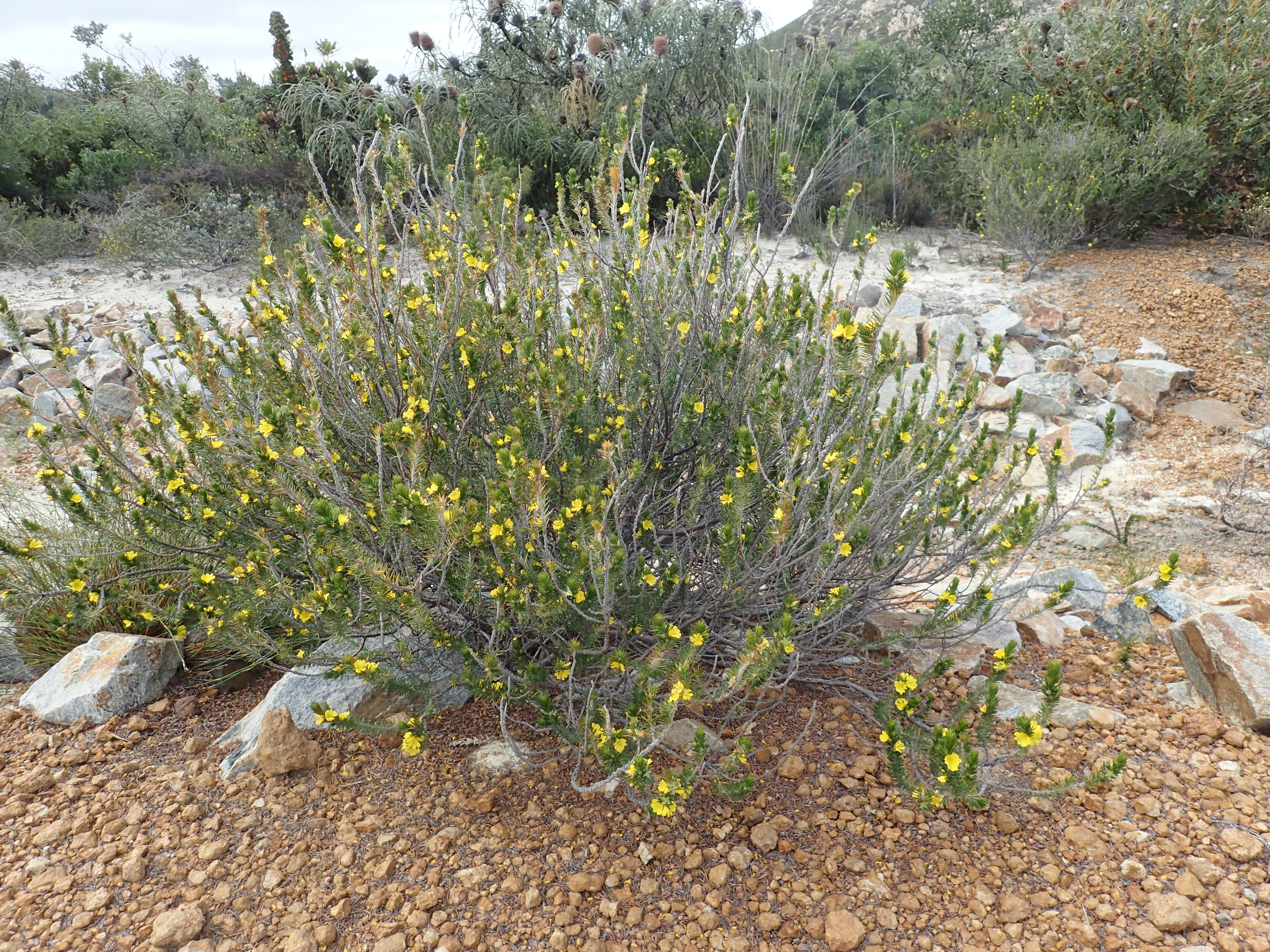
Habit near East Mount Barren

Hibbertia hamulosa is a species of flowering plant in the family Dilleniaceae and is endemic to the south coast of Western Australia. It is a shrub with somewhat crowded, thick, linear leaves and golden yellow flowers with five to eight stamens fused at their bases, all on one side of two densely hairy carpels.

== Description ==
Hibbertia hamulosa is a spreading shrub that typically grows to a height of up to 1 m (3 ft 3 in) and has branchlets densely covered with woolly, grey or white hairs when young. The leaves are crowded, linear to awl-shaped, almost needle-shaped, 7–18 mm (0.28–0.71 in) long and 0.5–1.0 mm (0.020–0.039 in) wide on a petiole 0.5–1.0 mm (0.020–0.039 in) long. The flowers are arranged singly on the ends of short side shoots, on a densely hairy peduncle 2–4 mm (0.079–0.157 in) long with awl-shaped bracts at the base of the sepals. The five sepals are joined at the base, 5–6.5 mm (0.20–0.26 in) long, the inner ones slightly broader than the outer ones. The five petals are golden yellow, egg-shaped with the narrower end towards the base and 4–7 mm (0.16–0.28 in) long with a notch at the tip. There are five to eight stamens, fused at the base on one side of the two densely hairy carpels that each contain two ovules. Flowering mostly occurs between July and October.

== Taxonomy ==
Hibbertia hamulosa was first formally described in 2000 by Judith R. Wheeler in the journal Nuytsia from specimens collected by Ruurd Dirk Hoogland on the south-west slope of East Mount Barren in 1971. The specific epithet (hamulosa) means "armed with small hooks", referring to the hairs on the outside of the sepals.

== Distribution and habitat ==
This species grows on rocky or gravelly slopes on the south coast of Western Australia between Bremer Bay and Esperance.

== Conservation status ==
Hibbertia hamulosa is classified as "not threatened" by the Western Australian Government Department of Parks and Wildlife.

== See also ==
- List of Hibbertia species
