= East Mount Barren =

Mountain in Western Australia

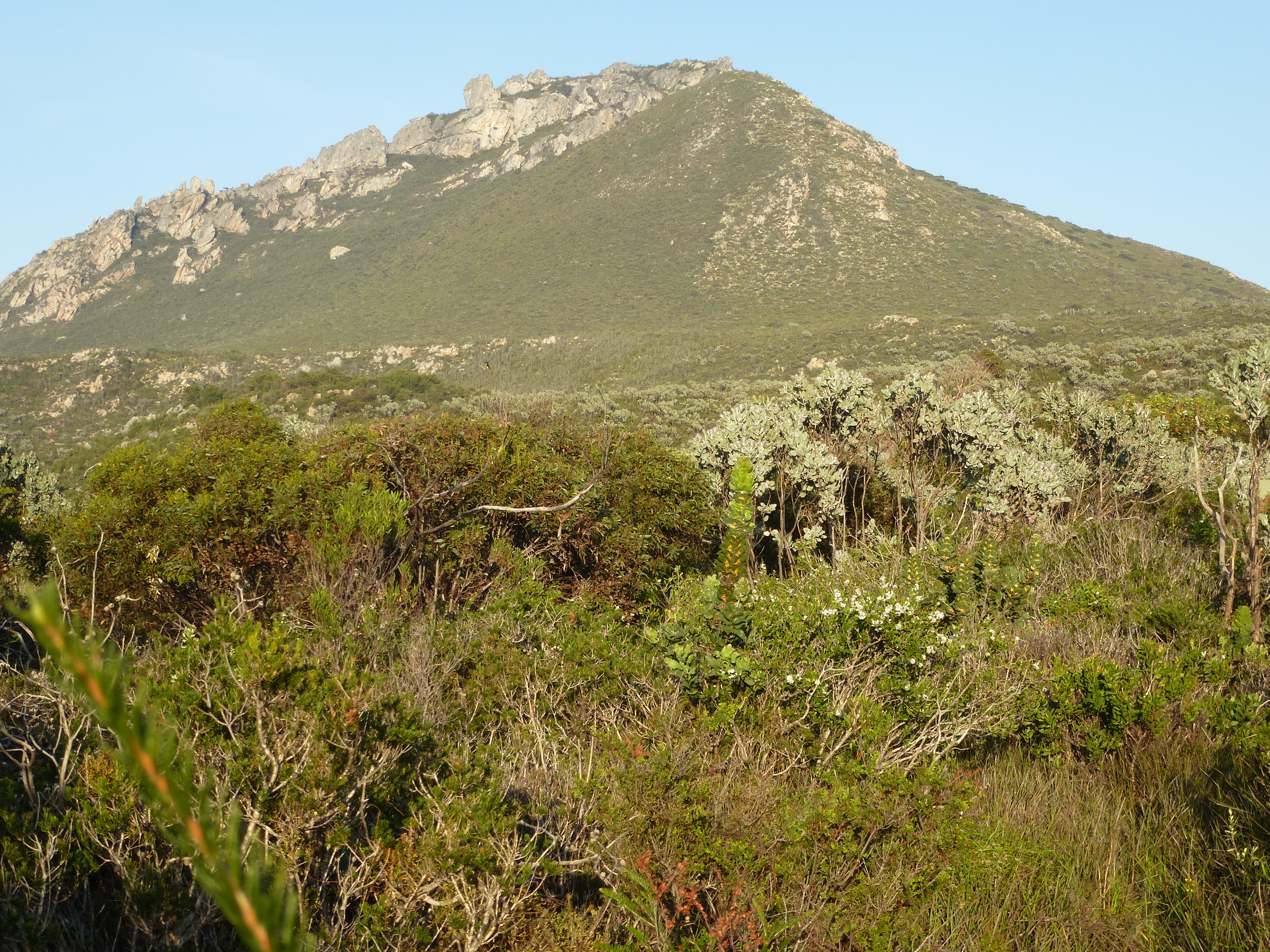

Highest point
- Elevation: 311 m (1,020 ft)
- Coordinates: 33°55′23″S 120°1′30″E

Geography
- Location in Fitzgerald River National Park
- Location: Goldfields-Esperance region of Western Australia
- Parent range: Barren Range

East Mount Barren is a quartzite peak of the Barren Range in Fitzgerald River National Park. It was sighted and named by explorer Matthew Flinders on 6 January 1802, together with two other peaks in the range, West Mount Barren and Middle Mount Barren. All were named because of their barren appearance. A walking track ascends 200 metres (656 ft) in height to the summit which has views of the coast from the Doubtful Islands to Mason Point as well as 50 kilometres (31 mi) inland.

Plant species that are endemic to East Barren Mountain and its immediate environs include Calothamnus macrocarpus, Eucalyptus burdettiana (Burdett gum), Kunzea similis subsp. similis, Regelia velutina (Barrens regelia) and Verticordia pityrhops. Other species of note include Acacia argutifolia (East Barrens wattle), Adenanthos ellipticus (oval-leaf adenanthos), Anthocercis fasciculata, Banksia speciosa (showy banksia), Dampiera deltoidea, Eucalyptus coronata (crowned mallee), Gonocarpus hispidus, Hakea hookeriana, Hibbertia papillata, Jacksonia compressa, Leptospermum confertum, Leucopogon compactus, Melaleuca papillosa, Pimelea physodes (Qualup bell) and Stylidium galioides (yellow mountain triggerplant).

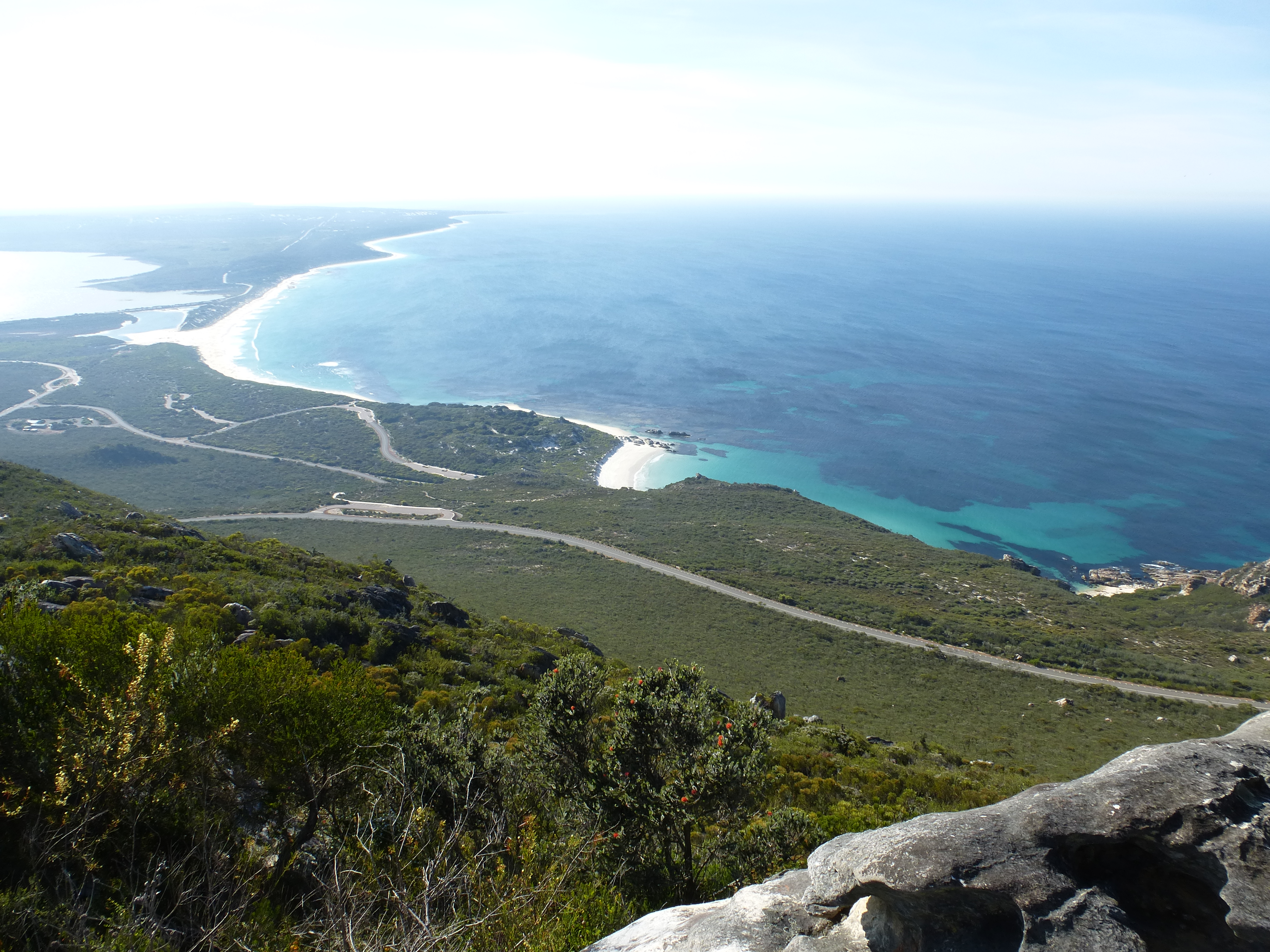
View east from summit

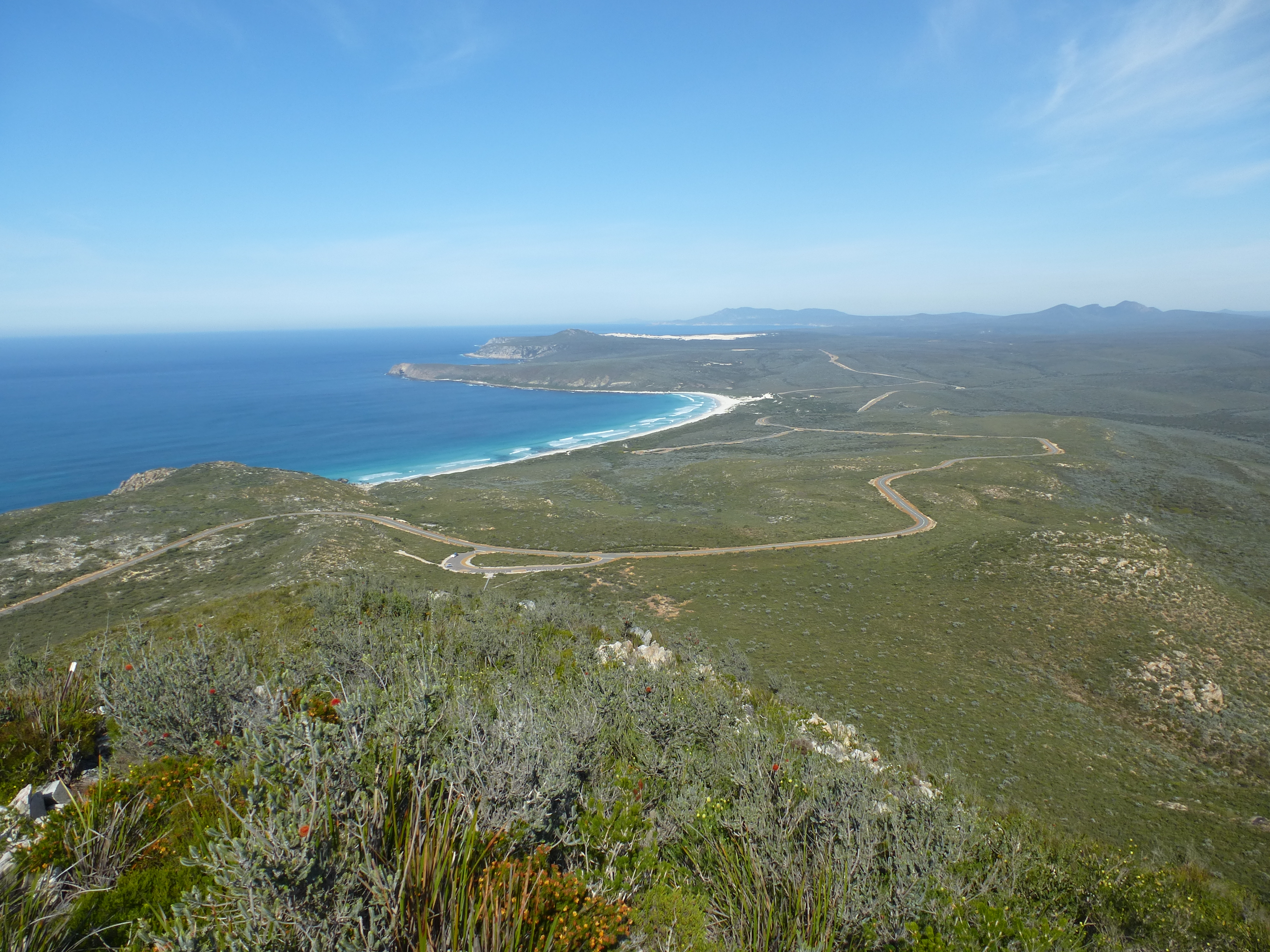
View west from summit
