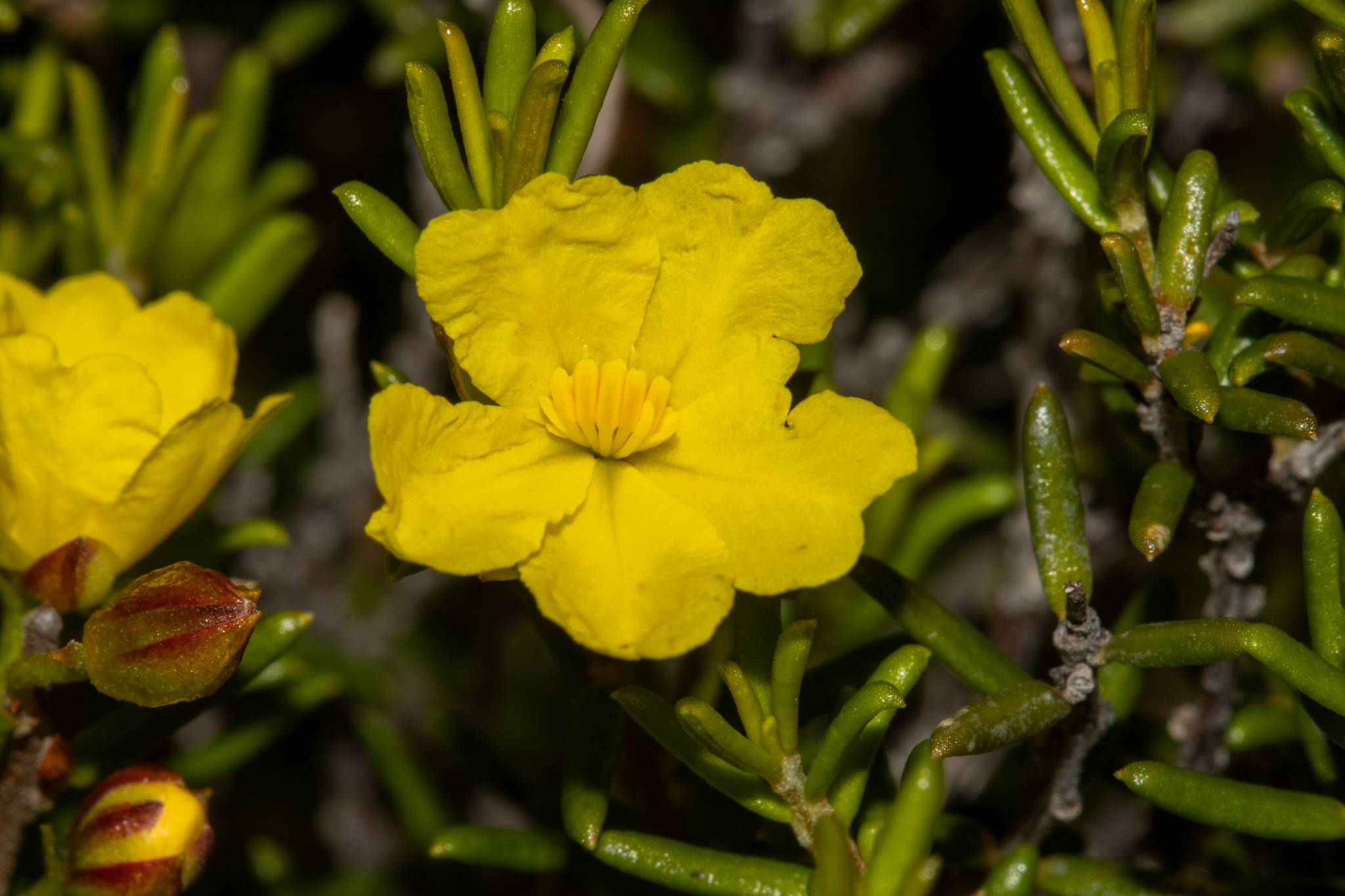
- Hibbertia papillata

Conservation status
- Priority Two — Poorly Known Taxa (DEC)

Scientific classification
- Kingdom: Plantae
- Clade: Tracheophytes
- Clade: Angiosperms
- Clade: Eudicots
- Order: Dilleniales
- Family: Dilleniaceae
- Genus: Hibbertia
- Species: H. papillata

Binomial name
- Hibbertia papillata J.R.Wheeler

= Hibbertia papillata =

Species of flowering plant

Hibbertia papillata is a species of flowering plant in the family Dilleniaceae and is endemic to the Fitzgerald River National Park in Western Australia. It is an erect shrub with crowded, linear, hairy leaves and yellow flowers usually with ten stamens, all on one side of, and curving over two hairy carpels.

== Description ==
Hibbertia papillata is an erect shrub that typically grows to a height of 30–40 cm (12–16 in), its young branchlets moderately covered with minute, star-shaped hairs. The leaves are hairy, more or less crowded, linear, 6–12 mm (0.24–0.47 in) long, about 1 mm (0.039 in) wide on a petiole 0.5–1 mm (0.020–0.039 in) long with the edges rolled under and covering most of the lower surface. The flowers are arranged singly in leaf axils near the ends of branches on pedicels 3–8 mm (0.12–0.31 in) long with narrow triangular bracts 1.5–4 mm (0.059–0.157 in) long at the base of the sepals. The five sepals are egg-shaped, 3.5–6 mm (0.14–0.24 in) long with star-shaped hairs on the outside. The five petals are yellow, egg-shaped with the narrower end towards the base and 4.0–7.5 mm (0.16–0.30 in) long with a small notch at the tip. There are usually ten stamens arranged on one side of, and curving over two hairy carpels that each contain two ovules. Flowering occurs from September to October.

== Taxonomy ==
Hibbertia papillata was first formally described in 2004 by Judith R. Wheeler in the journal Nuytsia from specimens she collected on the south-east slopes of East Mount Barren in 1986. The specific epithet (papillata) refers to the minute pimples on the upper surface of the leaves.

== Distribution and habitat ==
This hibbertia is only known from the Fitzgerald River National Park where it grows in low heath on ridges and slopes.

== Conservation status ==
Hibbertia papillata is classified as "Priority Two" by the Western Australian Government Department of Parks and Wildlife meaning that it is poorly known and from only one or a few locations.

== See also ==
- List of Hibbertia species
