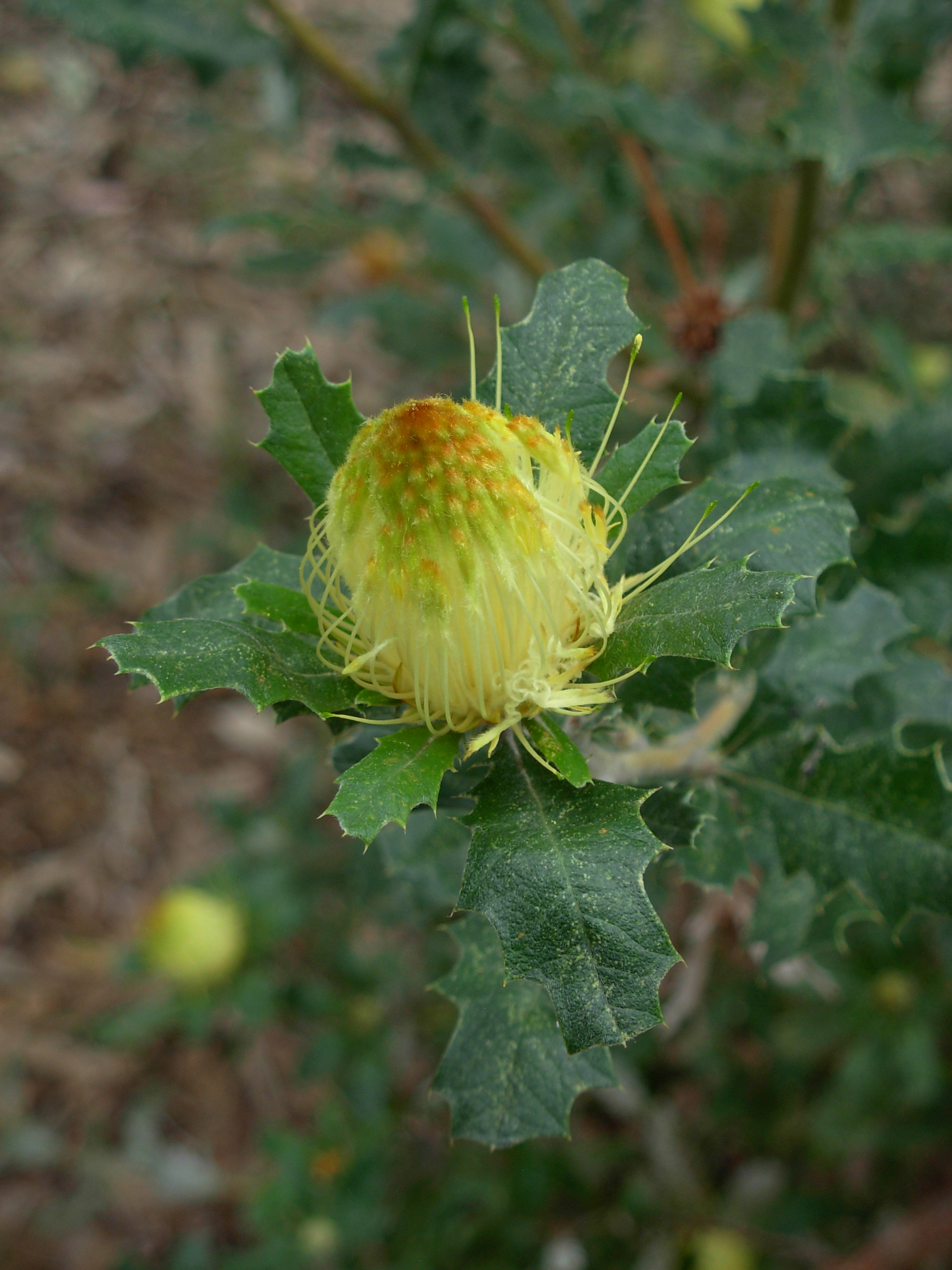

Scientific classification
- Kingdom: Plantae
- Clade: Tracheophytes
- Clade: Angiosperms
- Clade: Eudicots
- Order: Proteales
- Family: Proteaceae
- Genus: Banksia
- Species: B. undata A.R.Mast & K.R.Thiele
- Variety: B. u. var. undata

Trinomial name
- Banksia undata var. undata

Synonyms
- Dryandra praemorsa var. praemorsa

= Banksia undata var. undata =

Variety of shrub endemic to Western Australia

Banksia undata var. undata is a shrub endemic to Western Australia.

It was known as Dryandra praemorsa var. praemorsa until 2007, when all Dryandra species were transferred to Banksia by Austin Mast and Kevin Thiele. As there was already a plant named Banksia praemorsa (cut-leaf banksia), Mast and Thiele were forced to choose a new specific epithet; their choice, "undata", is from the Latin undatus ("undulate"), in reference to the wavy leaves. As the autonymic variety, the varietal name changed along with the specific name.

It grows in laterite and granitic soils between Clackline and Dwellingup in south west Western Australia. It flowers from August to October.

It is probably the most cultivated of all dryandras.
