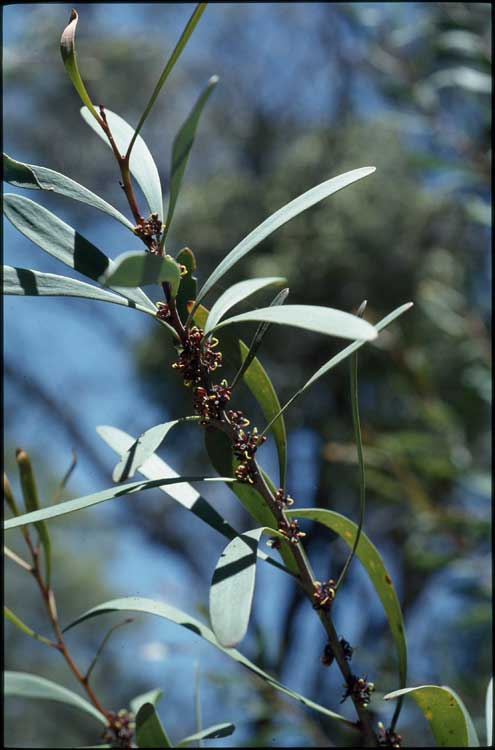
- Hakea hookeriana in the ANBG

Scientific classification
- Kingdom: Plantae
- Clade: Tracheophytes
- Clade: Angiosperms
- Clade: Eudicots
- Order: Proteales
- Family: Proteaceae
- Genus: Hakea
- Species: H. hookeriana

Binomial name
- Hakea hookeriana Meisn.
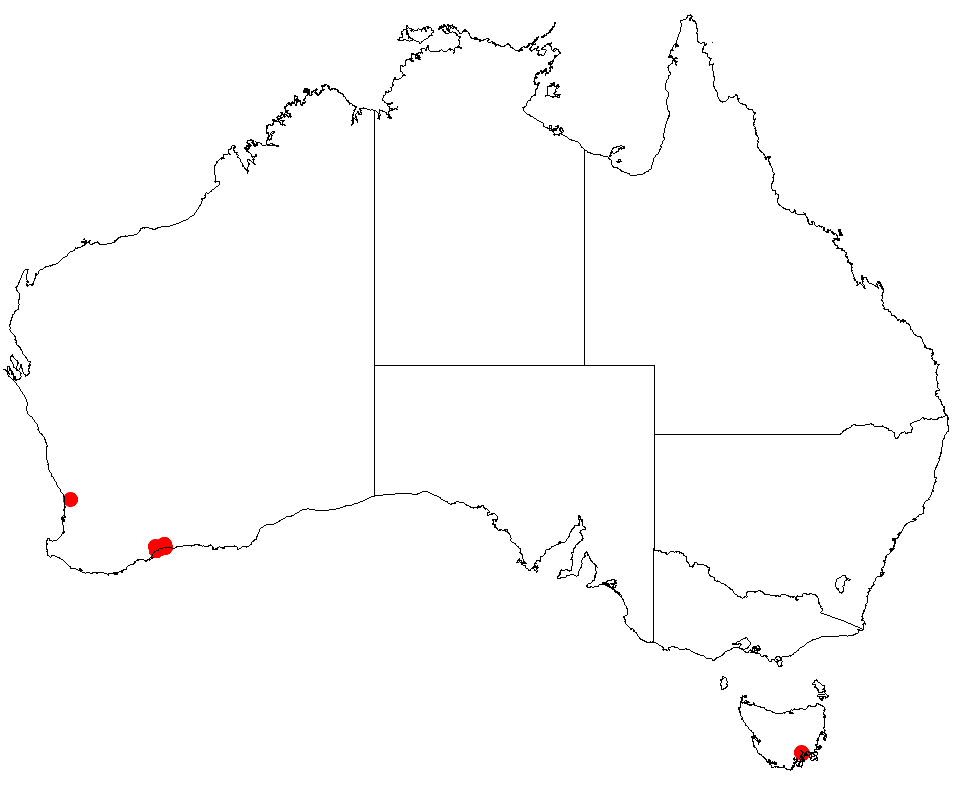
- Occurrence data from AVH

= Hakea hookeriana =

Barren Range hakea

Species of shrub endemic to Western Australia

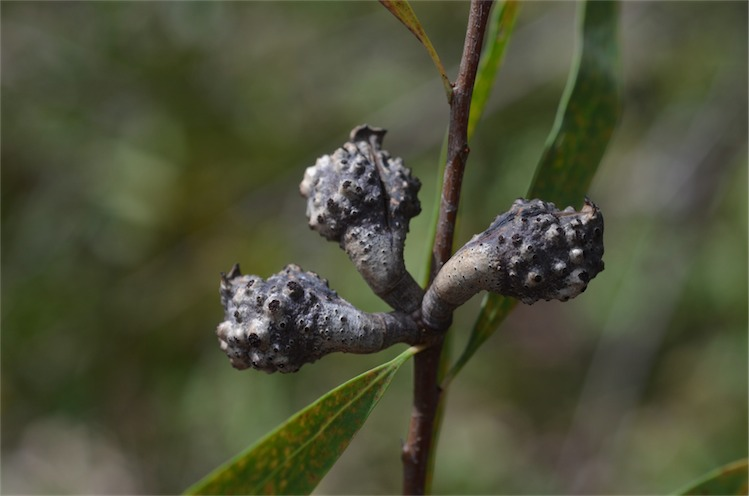
Hakea hookeriana fruit

Hakea hookeriana, commonly known as the Barren Range hakea, is a shrub of the genus Hakea native to Western Australia.

== Description ==
The erect open non-lignotuberous shrub or tree typically grows to a height of 1 to 5 metres (3.3 to 16.4 ft). The branchlets can be either glabrous or hairy and ferruginous The narrow obovate leaves are 7 to 13 centimetres (2.8 to 5.1 in) long and 10 to 25 millimetres (0.4 to 1.0 in) wide.

It produces red brown or white or cream-yellow flowers from September to January. Each inflorescence is umbelliform containing five, seven or nine flowers with obscure rachis. After flowering, obliquely obovate shaped fruit that are 5 to 5.5 cm (2.0 to 2.2 in) long and 2.7 to 3.3 cm (1.1 to 1.3 in) wide are formed. Within the fruits are obovate shaped seeds with a wing down a single side.

== Taxonomy and naming ==
H. hookeriana was first formally described by Carl Meissner in 1856 as part of Augustin Pyramus de Candolle's work Prodromus Systematis Naturalis Regni Vegetabilis. The species is named for William Jackson Hooker.

== Distribution and habitat ==
Hakea hookeriana is found in an area in the western part of Fitzgerald River National Park along the south coast of the Goldfields–Esperance region of Western Australia where it is found among rocks and rocky outcrops on cliffs and gullies growing in quartzite soils. It is often part of scrubland communities including Banksia heliantha.
