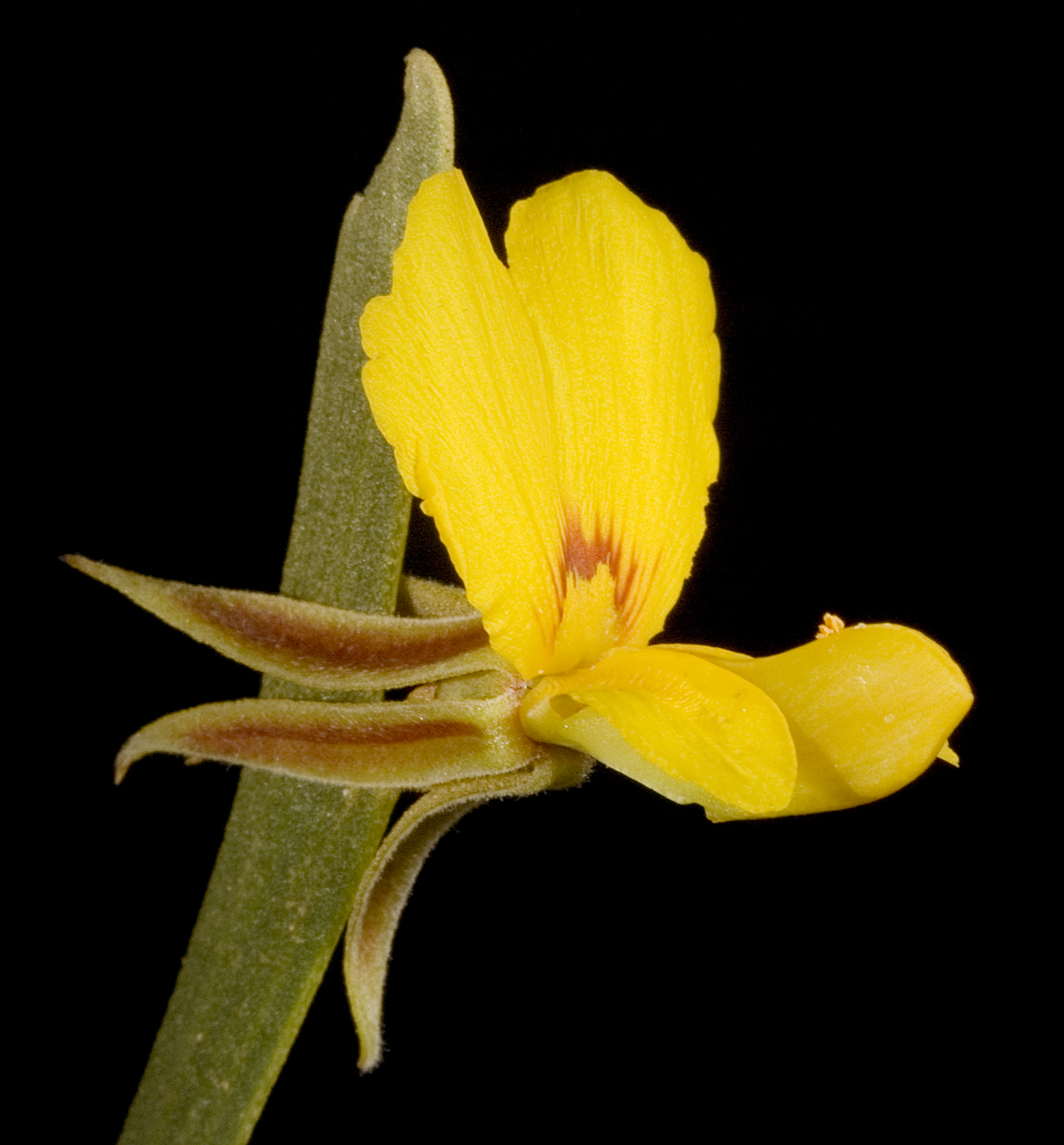

Scientific classification
- Kingdom: Plantae
- Clade: Tracheophytes
- Clade: Angiosperms
- Clade: Eudicots
- Clade: Rosids
- Order: Fabales
- Family: Fabaceae
- Subfamily: Faboideae
- Genus: Jacksonia
- Species: J. compressa

Binomial name
- Jacksonia compressa Turcz.

= Jacksonia compressa =

Species of legume

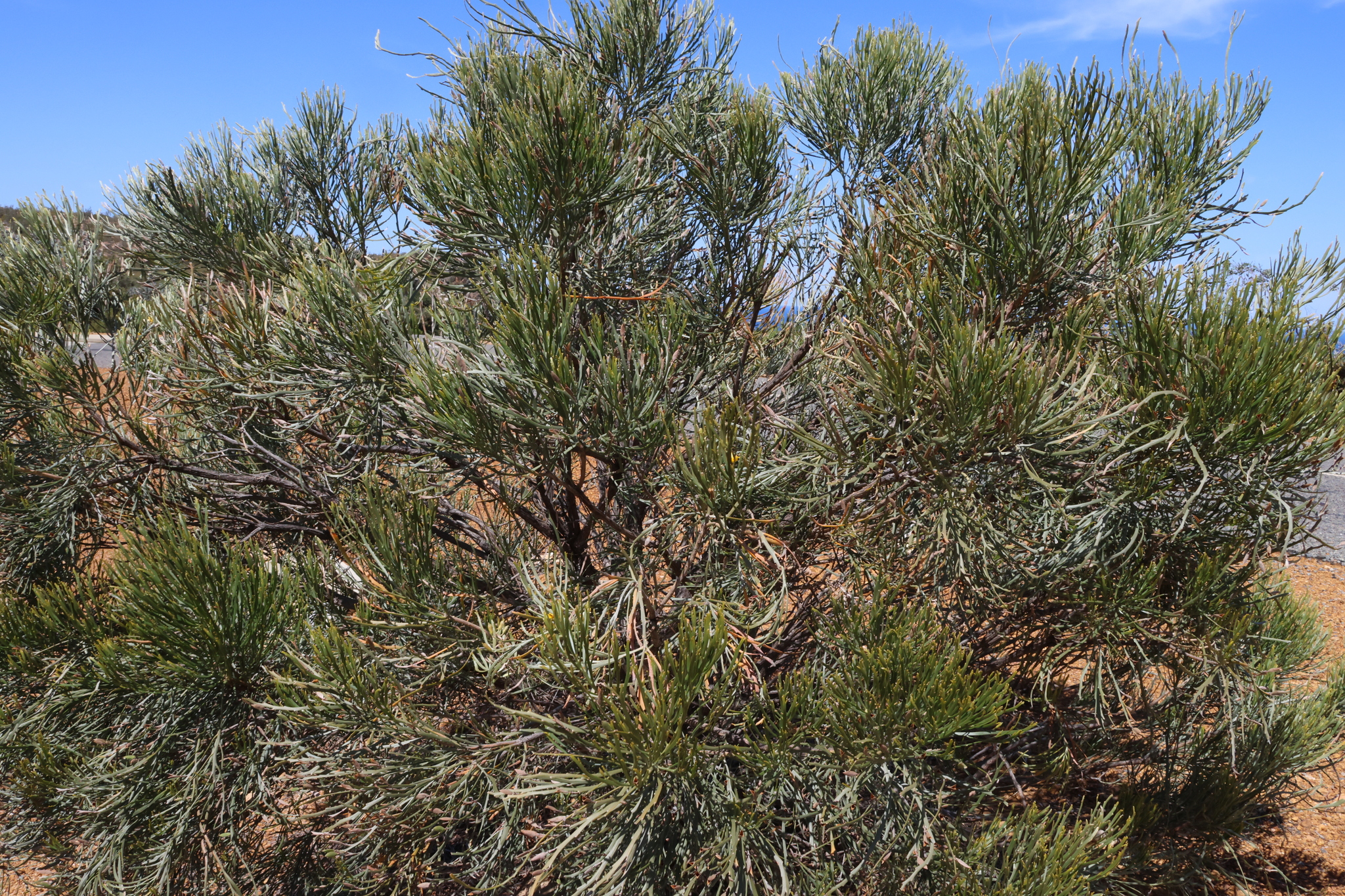
Habit near East Mount Barren

Jacksonia compressa is a species of flowering plant in the family Fabaceae and is endemic to the south west of Western Australia. It is an erect, bushy shrub with sharply pointed end branches, yellow-orange flowers with red markings, and woody, hairy pods.

== Description ==
Jacksonia compressa is an erect, bushy, densely-branched shrub that typically grows up to 0.4–3 m (1 ft 4 in – 9 ft 10 in) high and 0.3–1 m (1 ft 0 in – 3 ft 3 in) wide, its branches yellowish green and prominently ribbed. Its end branches are pungent phylloclades, its leaves reduced to egg-shaped scales with toothed edges, 0.6–2.3 mm (0.024–0.091 in) long and 0.8–1.3 mm (0.031–0.051 in) wide. The flowers are scattered along branches on a pedicel 2.2–3 mm (0.087–0.118 in) long. There are egg-shaped bracteoles 1.0–1.5 mm (0.039–0.059 in) long and 0.7–1 mm (0.028–0.039 in) wide on the pedicels. The floral tube is 1–3 mm (0.039–0.118 in) long and the sepals are membranous, the lobes 11–16.8 mm (0.43–0.66 in) long, 1.5–3.0 mm (0.059–0.118 in) wide and fused at the base for 0.7–1.0 mm (0.028–0.039 in). The standard petal is yellow-orange with a red "eye", 7.7–12.7 mm (0.30–0.50 in) long and 8–13 mm (0.31–0.51 in) wide, the wings yellow-orange with pale red markings, 12.3–12.4 mm (0.48–0.49 in) long, and the keel yellow-orange, 11.1–13.1 mm (0.44–0.52 in) long. The filaments of the stamens are green, 10.4–15.2 mm (0.41–0.60 in) long. Flowering occurs throughout the year, and the fruit is a woody, elliptic pod, 16–23.9 mm (0.63–0.94 in) long and 4.7–5.7 mm (0.19–0.22 in) wide.

== Taxonomy ==
Jacksonia compressa was first formally described in 1853 by Nikolai Turczaninow in the Bulletin de la Société Impériale des Naturalistes de Moscou from specimens collected by James Drummond. The specific epithet (compressa) means 'compressed', referring to the flattened fruit and branches.

== Distribution and habitat ==
This species of Jacksonia grows in dense shrubland on grey sand on rocky ridges between West Mount Barren and Hopetoun in the Esperance Plains bioregion of south-west of Western Australia.

== Conservation status ==
Jacksonia compressa is listed as "not threatened" by the Government of Western Australia Department of Biodiversity, Conservation and Attractions.
