= Banksia undata var. splendens =

Scientific classification
- Kingdom: Plantae
- Clade: Tracheophytes
- Clade: Angiosperms
- Clade: Eudicots
- Order: Proteales
- Family: Proteaceae
- Genus: Banksia
- Species: B. undata
- Variety: B. u. var. splendens

Trinomial name
- Banksia undata var. splendens (A.S.George) A.R.Mast & K.R.Thiele

Synonyms
- Dryandra praemorsa var. splendens A.S.George

Variety of shrub endemic to Western Australia

Banksia undata var. splendens is a shrub endemic to Western Australia.

It was first published by Alex George in 1996, based on a specimen collected by him two years earlier. The name given was Dryandra praemorsa var. splendens, the varietal epithet referring to the "splendid" flower heads. In 2007, all Dryandra species were transferred to Banksia by Austin Mast and Kevin Thiele. As there was already a plant named Banksia praemorsa (Cut-leaf Banksia), Mast and Thiele chose the new specific epithet "undata"; thus the current name of this variety is Banksia undata var. splendens (A.S.George) A.R.Mast & K.R.Thiele.

It grows in lateritic loam from Bannister north to the Brookton Highway. It flowers from September to October.

It is popular in cultivation, and is favoured by the cut flower trade. There is a pink-flowered form that is especially popular with the cut flower trade.
