= Dryandra subg. Hemiclidia =

Obsolete clade of plants

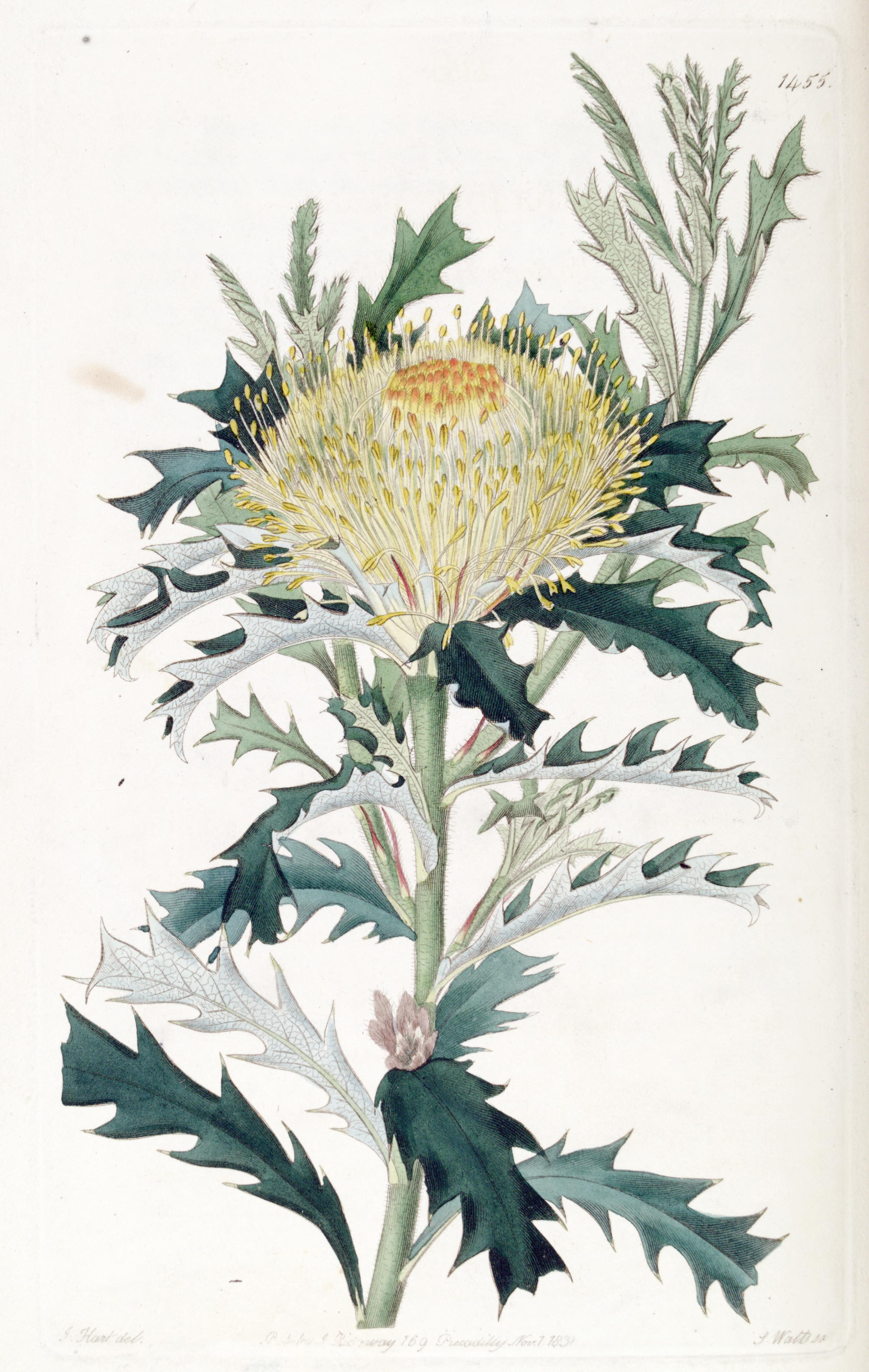
Banksia falcata as figured in Plate 1455 of Edwards's Botanical Register (Volume 17, 1831). This is the type species of Hemiclidia under the name Hemiclidia baxteri, and the type species of Dryandra subg. Hemiclidia under the name Dryandra falcata.

Dryandra subg. Hemiclidia is an obsolete plant taxon that encompassed material that is now included in Banksia. Published at genus rank as Hemiclidia by Robert Brown in 1830, it was set aside by George Bentham in 1870, but reinstated at subgenus rank by Alex George in 1996. In 2007, all Dryandra species were transferred into Banksia at series rank, and the infrageneric Dryandra taxa, including D. subg. Hemiclidia, were set aside.

== According to Brown ==
In 1810, Robert Brown published the genus Dryandra in his On the Proteaceae of Jussieu. Thirteen species were published, including Dryandra falcata (now Banksia falcata), but no infrageneric arrangement was proffered. Twenty years later, Brown published a further eleven species and the first infrageneric arrangement in his Supplementum primum prodromi florae Novae Hollandiae. By this time, Brown had observed the tendency in D. falcata for one of the two ovules in each follicle to abort, thereafter developing into a winglike appendage to the seed separator. On this basis, he transferred the species into a monotypic genus, which he named Hemiclidia, from the Greek hemi ("half") and perhaps kleidos ("barrier", "means of closing").

Hemiclidia was retained in the 1856 arrangement of Carl Meissner, but discarded by George Bentham in his 1870 revision of the genus. Bentham correctly observed that the abortion of seeds occurs in other Dryandra species, and is a diagnostically unimportant character:

as far as I can understand the characters given, the difference in the fruit upon which the genus Hemiclidia was founded is merely the result of the abortion of one ovule, which occurs occasionally or perhaps constantly in one or two other species of Dryandra.

== According to George ==
In 1996, Alex George published a thorough revision of Dryandra in preparation of his monograph on that genus for the Flora of Australia series. He segregated D. falcata and the newly published D. glauca (now Banksia glaucifolia) into a subgenus based on their unusual follicles, which are small, hairy and pliable. Needing a name for the subgenus, George noted that Hemiclidia was available, and had an appropriate type species in D. falcata. He therefore demoted Hemiclidia to subgenus rank as Dryandra subg. Hemiclidia (R.Br.) A.S.George. Its placement and circumscription in George's taxonomic arrangement of Dryandra may be summarised as follows:

Genus Dryandra (now Banksia ser. Dryandra)

Subgenus Dryandra (24 series, 91 species, 39 subspecies, 23 varieties)
Subgenus Hemiclidia

D. falcata (now Banksia falcata)
D. glauca (now Banksia glaucifolia)

Subgenus Diplophragma (1 species)

This arrangement remained current until 2007, when Austin Mast and Kevin Thiele transferred Dryandra into Banksia. They were not yet ready, however, to tender an infrageneric arrangement encompassing Dryandra, so as an interim measure they transferred Dryandra into Banksia at series rank. This minimised the nomenclatural disruption of the transfer, but also caused George's rich infrageneric arrangement to be set aside. Thus under the interim arrangements implemented by Mast and Thiele, D. subg. Hemiclidia has been set aside.
