= Calothamnus macrocarpus =

Conservation status
- Priority Two — Poorly Known Taxa (DEC)

Scientific classification
- Kingdom: Plantae
- Clade: Tracheophytes
- Clade: Angiosperms
- Clade: Eudicots
- Clade: Rosids
- Order: Myrtales
- Family: Myrtaceae
- Genus: Calothamnus
- Species: C. macrocarpus

Binomial name
- Calothamnus macrocarpus Hawkeswood

Synonyms
- Melaleuca macrocarpa (Hawkeswood) Craven & R.D.Edwards

Species of flowering plant

Calothamnus macrocarpus is a plant in the myrtle family, Myrtaceae and is endemic to the south-west of Western Australia. It is an erect shrub with bright red flowers in spring and large, almost spherical fruit. It has a limited distribution near Hopetoun. (In 2014 Craven, Edwards and Cowley proposed that the species be renamed Melaleuca macrocarpa.)

== Description ==
Calothamnus macrocarpus is an erect shrub with many branches growing to a height of about 2–3 metres (7–10 ft). Its leaves are crowded, 20–30 millimetres (0.8–1 in) long, 1–2 millimetres (0.04–0.08 in) in diameter, cylindrical in shape and taper to a non-prickly point. There are prominent oil glands on the leaves.

The flowers are deep red usually in small clusters between the leaves. The petals are 6–8 millimetres (0.2–0.3 in) long, thin, papery and pink to brown. The stamens are arranged in 5 claw-like bundles usually with 26 to 28 stamens per bundle. Flowering occurs from August to December and is followed by fruits which are woody, almost spherical capsules, 13–18 millimetres (0.5–0.7 in) in diameter, which are often hidden in the foliage.

== Taxonomy and naming ==
Calothamnus macrocarpus was first formally described in 1984 by Trevor Hawkeswood in the botanical journal Nuytsia. The specific epithet (macrocarpus) is derived from the Greek macros meaning "large" or "long" and carpos meaning "fruit" and refers to the prominently large, almost spherical fruit of this species.

== Distribution and habitat ==
Calothamnus macrocarpus occurs near the summit of East Mount Barren near Hopetoun in the Esperance Plains biogeographic region where it grows in sand and soils derived from quartzite.

== Conservation ==
Calothamnus macrocarpus is classified as "Priority Two" by the Government of Western Australia Department of Biodiversity, Conservation and Attractions, meaning that it is poorly known and from one or a few locations.
