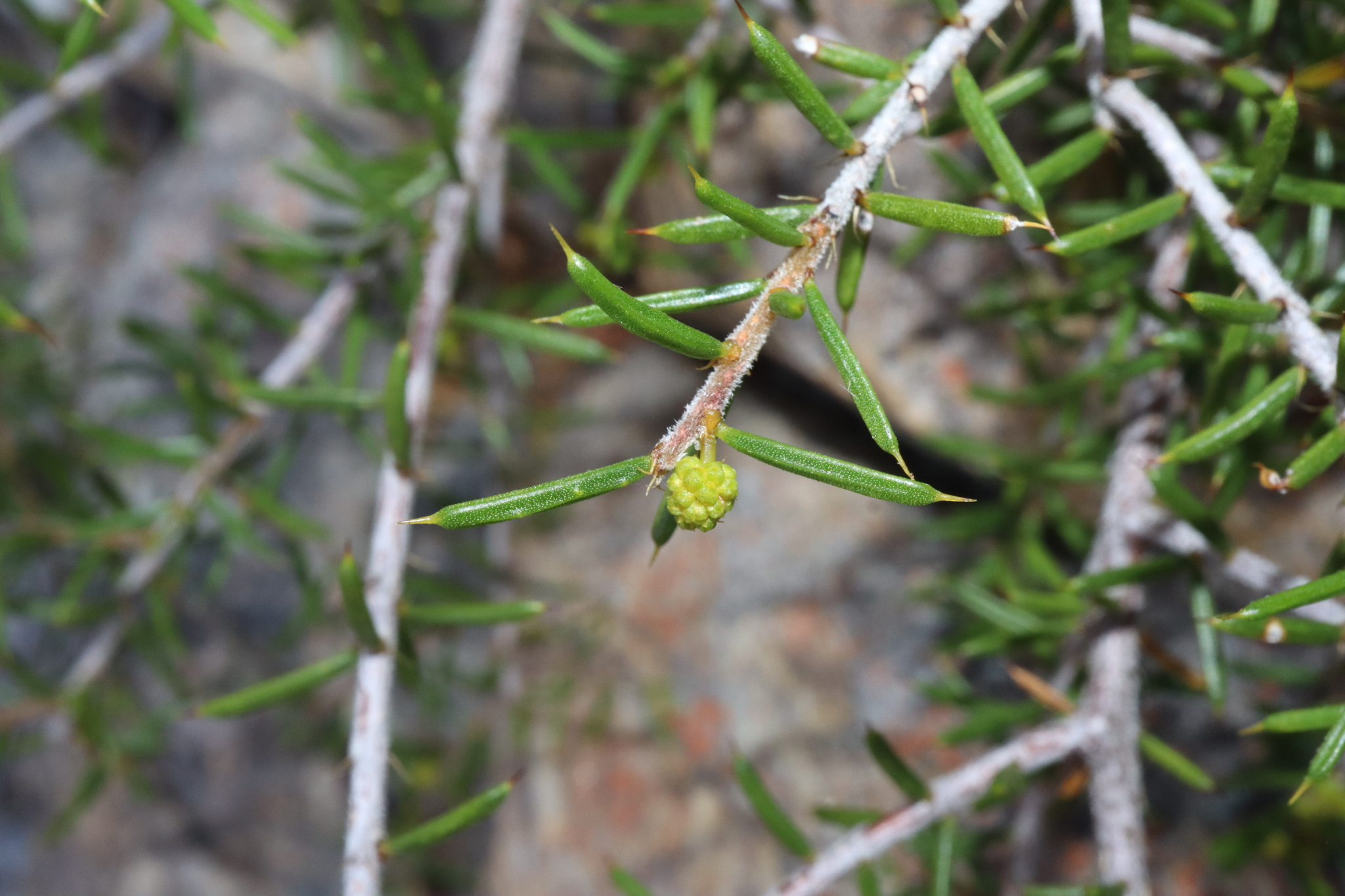

Conservation status
- Priority Four — Rare Taxa (DEC)

Scientific classification
- Kingdom: Plantae
- Clade: Tracheophytes
- Clade: Angiosperms
- Clade: Eudicots
- Clade: Rosids
- Order: Fabales
- Family: Fabaceae
- Subfamily: Caesalpinioideae
- Clade: Mimosoid clade
- Genus: Acacia
- Species: A. argutifolia

Binomial name
- Acacia argutifolia Maslin
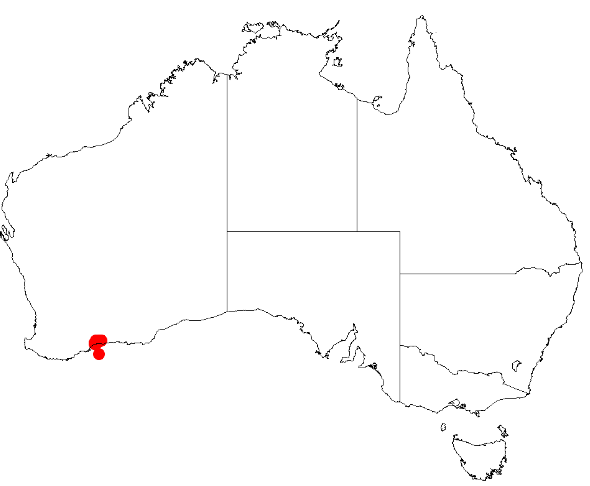
- Occurrence data from AVH

Synonyms
- Racosperma argutifolium (Maslin) Pedley

= Acacia argutifolia =

Species of legume

Acacia argutifolia, commonly known as East Barrens wattle, is a species of flowering plant in the family Fabaceae and is endemic to the south of Western Australia. It is a low, spreading, intricate shrub with linear phyllodes, spherical heads of pale yellow flowers, and narrowly oblong, somewhat papery pods up to 40 mm (1.6 in) long.

== Description ==
Acacia argutifolia is a low, spreading, intricate shrub that typically grows to a height of 20–70 cm (7.9–27.6 in), dividing at ground level into three or four main branches. Its phyllodes are linear, triangular in cross section, 6–13 mm (0.24–0.51 in) long and about 1 mm (0.039 in) wide with a midrib prominent on the lower surface. There are stipules 1.5–2 mm (0.059–0.079 in) long at the base of the phyllodes. The phyllodes are sharply-pointed and glabrous, sometimes with a gland on the upper surface. The flowers are arranged in a spherical head at the base of phyllodes on a peduncle 5 mm (0.20 in) long with 23 to 25 pale yellow flowers. Flowering occurs from late July to January, and the fruit is a somewhat papery, narrowly oblong pod up to 40 mm (1.6 in) long and 2–4 mm (0.079–0.157 in) wide with dull brown seeds about 3 mm (0.12 in) long and 1.8 mm (0.071 in) wide.

== Taxonomy ==
Acacia argutifolia was first formally described in 1976 by Bruce Maslin in the journal Nuytsia from specimens he collected in the Whoogarup Range, about 29 km (18 mi) west of Hopetoun in 1975. The specific epithet (argutifolia) means 'sharply-pointed', referring to the phyllodes.

== Distribution and habitat ==
East Barrens wattle is mostly restricted to the Fitzgerald River National Park in the Esperance Plains bioregion of southern Western Australia, where it grows in shallow sand over quartzite in low open heath, shrubland and mallee communities.

== See also ==
- List of Acacia species
