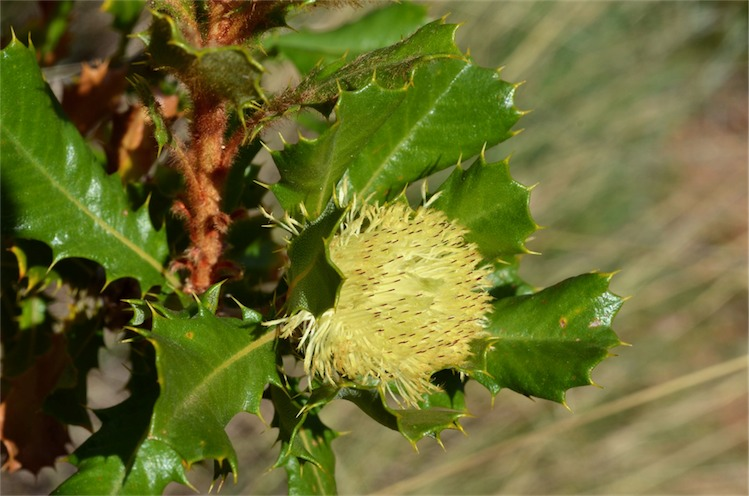
- Banksia obovata in the ANBG

Scientific classification
- Kingdom: Plantae
- Clade: Tracheophytes
- Clade: Angiosperms
- Clade: Eudicots
- Order: Proteales
- Family: Proteaceae
- Genus: Banksia
- Subgenus: Banksia subg. Banksia
- Series: Banksia ser. Dryandra
- Species: B. obovata

Binomial name
- Banksia obovata A.R.Mast and K.R.Thiele

Synonyms
- Dryandra cuneata R.Br.; Dryandra cuneata var. brevifolia Sweet nom. inval., nom. nud.; Dryandra cuneata var. longifolia Sweet nom. inval., nom. nud.; Josephia cuneata (R.Br.) Poir.

= Banksia obovata =

Wedge-leaved dryandra

Species of shrub in Western Australia

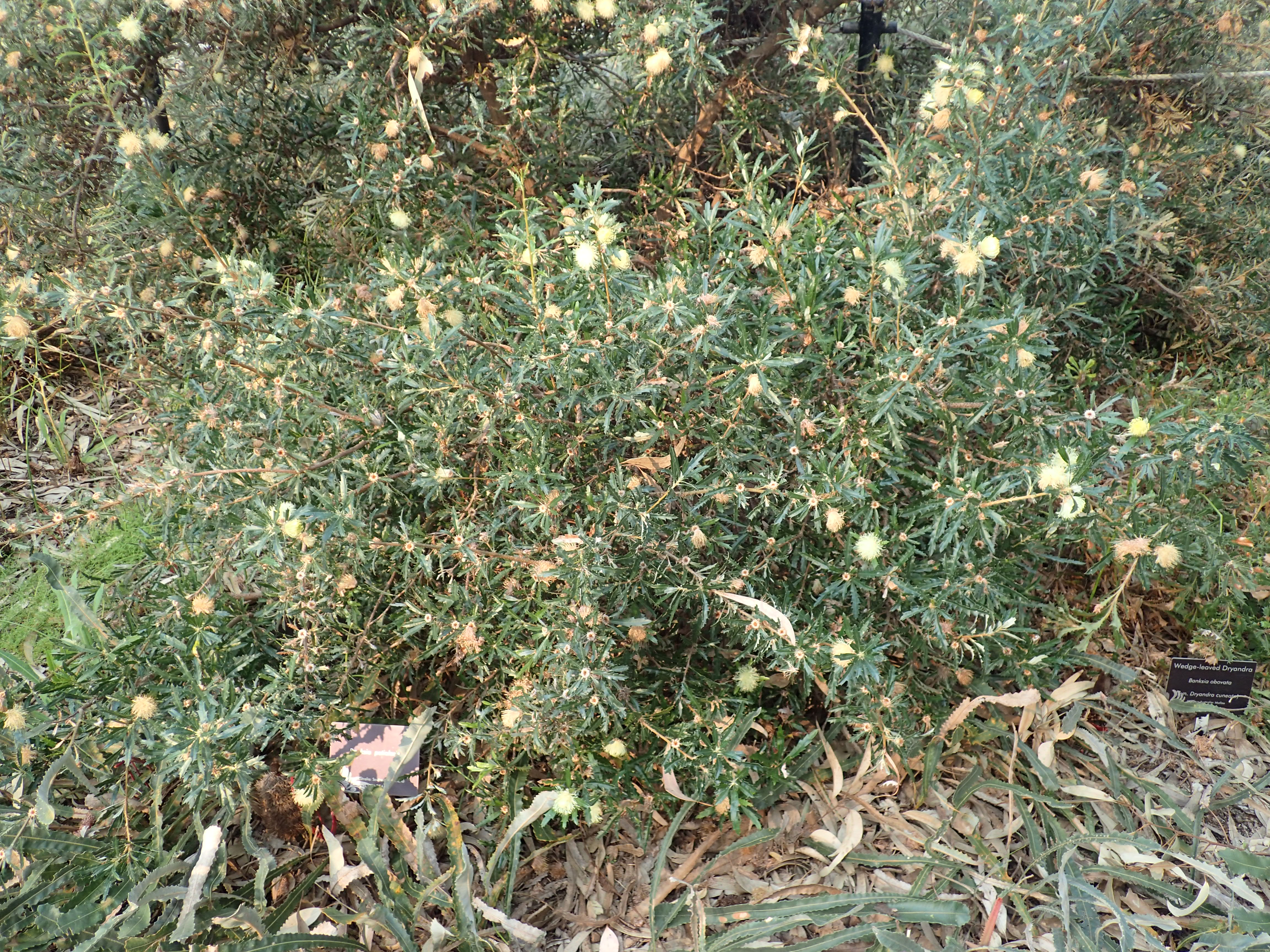
Habit in Kings Park

Banksia obovata, commonly known as wedge-leaved dryandra, is a species of shrub that is endemic to Western Australia. It has hairy stems, serrated, wedge-shaped to egg-shaped leaves with the lower end towards the base, cream-coloured or pale yellow flowers in heads of up to 100, and egg-shaped follicles. It is found in near-coastal areas in the south of the state.

== Description ==
Banksia obovata is a shrub that typically grows to a height of 2 m (6 ft 7 in) but does not form a lignotuber. It has wedge-shaped to egg-shaped leaves with the narrower end at the base, 25–65 mm (0.98–2.56 in) long and 10–30 mm (0.39–1.18 in) wide on a petiole up to 15 mm (0.59 in) long, with between four and twelve serrations on each side. Between thirty-five and one hundred cream-coloured or pale yellow flowers are borne in a head with linear to egg-shaped involucral bracts up to 12 mm (0.47 in) long at the base of the head. The perianth is 23–38 mm (0.91–1.50 in) long and the pistil 24–40 mm (0.94–1.57 in) long. Flowering mainly occurs from April to November, but also in other months and the follicles are egg-shaped, 10–14 mm (0.39–0.55 in) long.

== Taxonomy and naming ==
This species was first formally described in 1810 by Robert Brown in Transactions of the Linnean Society of London and was given the name Dryandra cuneata. The specific epithet (cuneata) is a Latin word meaning wedge-shaped.

In 2007, Austin Mast and Kevin Thiele transferred all dryandras to the genus Banksia. As there was already a plant named Banksia cuneata (matchstick banksia), Mast and Thiele chose the epithet obovata, meaning "inverted egg-shaped, in reference to the obovate leaves.

== Distribution and habitat ==
Wedge-leaved dryandra occurs near the south coast of Western Australia between Narrogin, Albany and the Cape Arid National Park, including in the Stirling Range. It grows in kwongan.
