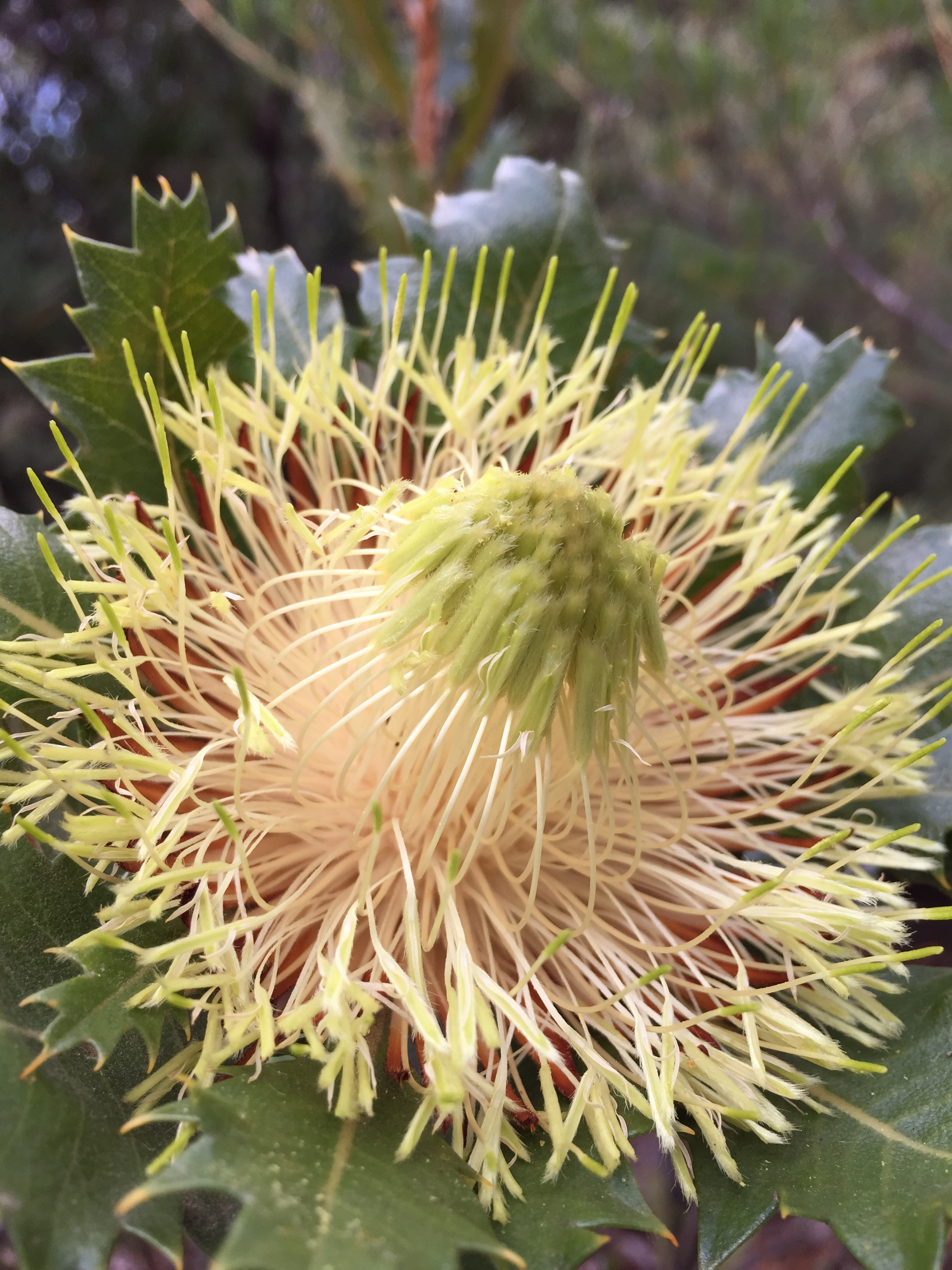
- Banksia heliantha in the ANBG

Scientific classification
- Kingdom: Plantae
- Clade: Tracheophytes
- Clade: Angiosperms
- Clade: Eudicots
- Order: Proteales
- Family: Proteaceae
- Genus: Banksia
- Subgenus: Banksia subg. Banksia
- Series: Banksia ser. Dryandra
- Species: B. heliantha

Binomial name
- Banksia heliantha A.R.Mast & K.R.Thiele

Synonyms
- Dryandra quercifolia Meisn.; Josephia quercifolia (Meisn.) Kuntze

= Banksia heliantha =

Oak-leaved dryandra

Species of shrub endemic to Western Australia

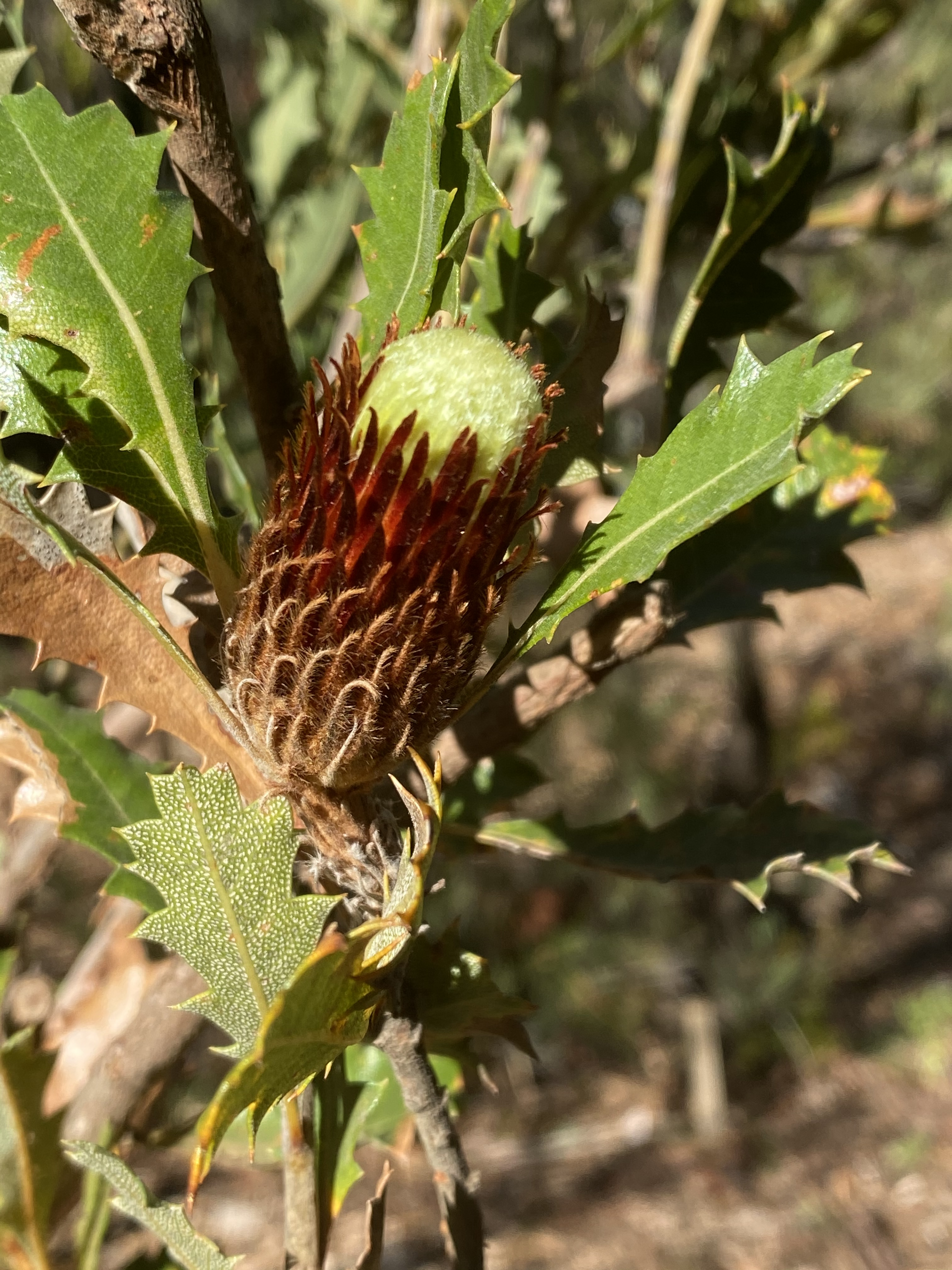
Young flower head, showing bracts

Banksia heliantha, commonly known as oak-leaved dryandra, is a species of shrub that is endemic to Western Australia. It has hairy stems, serrated, egg-shaped to wedge-shaped leaves, golden yellow flowers and partly woolly follicles.

== Description ==
Banksia heliantha is a robust, openly-branched shrub that typically grows to a height of 0.6–3 m (2 ft 0 in – 9 ft 10 in) and has hairy stems but does not form a lignotuber. The leaves are wedge-shaped to egg-shaped with the narrower end towards the base, 50–90 mm (2.0–3.5 in) long and 22–50 mm (0.87–1.97 in) wide on a petiole up to 10 mm (0.39 in) long. The leaves have between five and fifteen sharply-pointed teeth up to 6 mm (0.24 in) long on each side. The flowers are borne in groups of between 140 and 160 in a head on the ends of branches with hairy, tapering linear involucral bracts up to 50 mm (2.0 in) long at the base of the head. The flowers have a golden yellow perianth is 35–41 mm (1.4–1.6 in) long that is hairy at its base and a yellow pistil 41–52 mm (1.6–2.0 in) long and glabrous. Flowering occurs in March or from July to October and the follicles are egg-shaped, 15–20 mm (0.59–0.79 in) long and woolly in the upper half. Up to fifteen follicle form in each head.

== Taxonomy and naming ==
The oak-leaved dryandra was first formally described in 1856 by Carl Meissner who gave it the name Dryandra quercifolia and published the description in de Candolle's Prodromus Systematis Naturalis Regni Vegetabilis from specimens collected by James Drummond. The specific epithet (quercifolia) is a Latin word meaning "oak-leaved".

In 2007, Austin Mast and Kevin Thiele transferred all the Dryandra species to Banksia but there was already a different species known as Banksia quercifolia, so the name of this dryandra was changed to Banksia heliantha. The epithet (heliantha) is from ancient Greek, meaning "sun-flowered".

== Distribution and habitat ==
Banksia heliantha grows in dense kwongan on rocky hills near the south coast of Western Australia between the Gairdner River and East Mount Barren, and inland as far as the ranges north of Ravensthorpe, in the Esperance Plains and Mallee biogeographic regions.

== Conservation status ==
This banksia is classified as "not threatened" by the Government of Western Australia Department of Parks and Wildlife.
