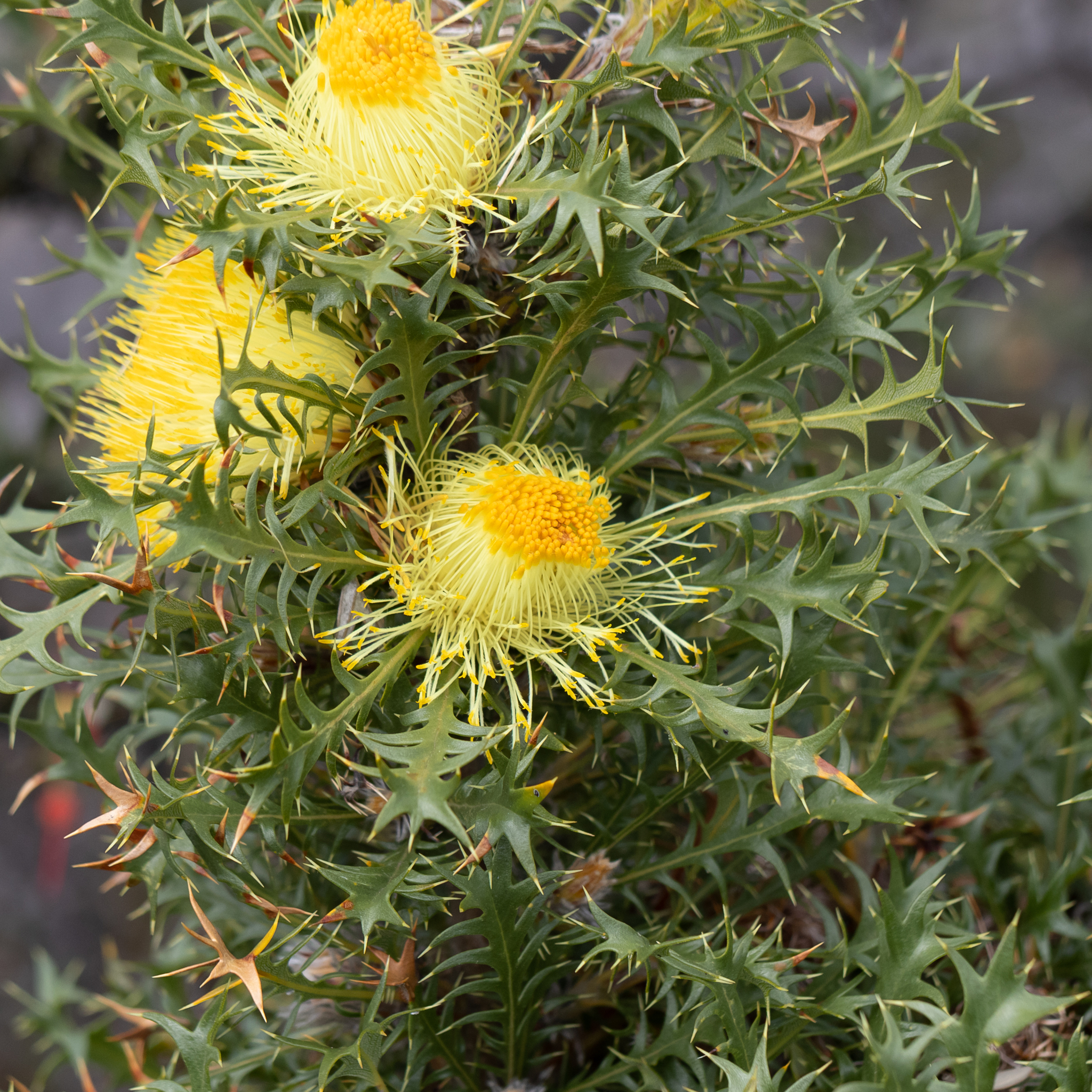
- Banksia falcata in Fitzgerald River National park

Scientific classification
- Kingdom: Plantae
- Clade: Tracheophytes
- Clade: Angiosperms
- Clade: Eudicots
- Order: Proteales
- Family: Proteaceae
- Genus: Banksia
- Subgenus: Banksia subg. Banksia
- Series: Banksia ser. Dryandra
- Species: B. falcata

Binomial name
- Banksia falcata (R.Br.) A.R.Mast & K.R.Thiele

Synonyms
- Dryandra dorrienii Domin; Dryandra falcata R.Br.; Hemiclidia baxteri R.Br. nom. illeg., nom. superfl.; Josephia falcata (R.Br.) Poir.

= Banksia falcata =

Prickly dryandra

Species of shrub endemic to Western Australia

Banksia falcata, commonly known as prickly dryandra, is a species of prickly, column-shaped shrub that is endemic to Western Australia. It has serrated or pinnatipartite leaves, heads of up to 150 yellow flowers and soft-hairy fruit.

== Description ==
Banksia falcata is a column-shaped shrub that typically grows to a height of 2.3 m (7 ft 7 in) but does not form a lignotuber. It has undulating, serrated to pinnatipartite leaves that are wedge-shaped in outline, 35–80 mm (1.4–3.1 in) long and 15–30 mm (0.59–1.18 in) wide on a petiole 5–12 mm (0.20–0.47 in) long, with between seven and thirteen sharply-pointed teeth on each side. The flowers are borne on a head containing between 110 and 150 flowers in each head. There are linear to narrow lance-shaped involucral bracts 15–20 mm (0.59–0.79 in) long covered with rusty, woolly hairs at the base of the head. The flowers have a bright yellow perianth 30–39 mm (1.2–1.5 in) long and a yellow pistil 32–45 mm (1.3–1.8 in) long. Flowering occurs from September to November or January and the follicles are oval, 6–7 mm (0.24–0.28 in) long and covered with soft hairs.

== Taxonomy and naming ==
This banksia was first formally described in 1810 by Robert Brown in the journal Transactions of the Linnean Society of London and given the name Dryandra falcata. In 2007, Austin Mast and Kevin Thiele transferred all the dryandras to the genus Banksia and this species became Banksia falcata. The specific epithet (falcata) is a Latin word meaning "falcate" or "shaped like a scythe or sickle".

== Distribution and habitat ==
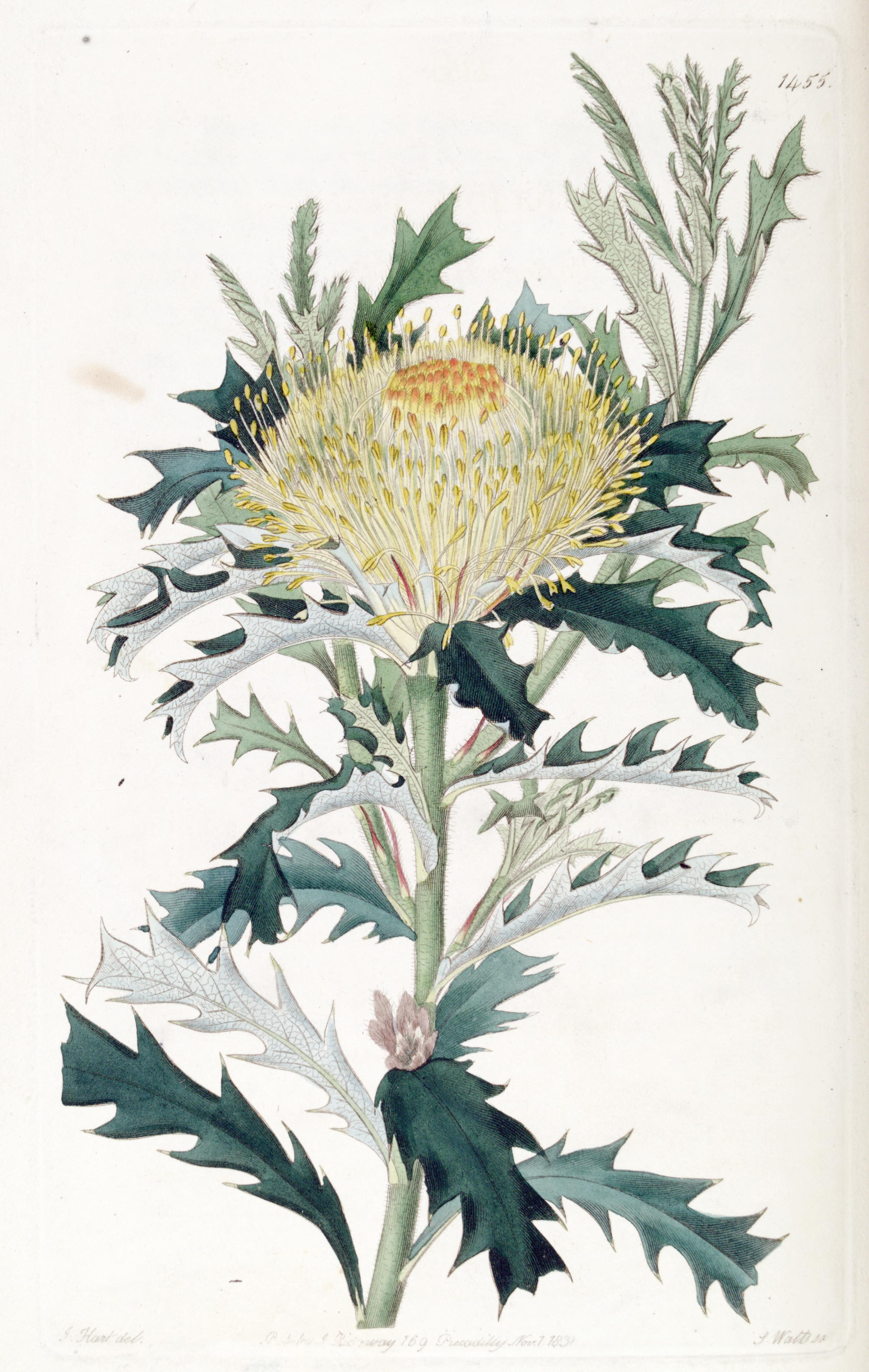
Illustration of Banksia falcata from Edwards's Botanical Register

Banksia falcata grows in kwongan between the Stirling Range and Esperance in the Avon Wheatbelt, Esperance Plains, Jarrah Forest and Mallee biogeographic regions.
