= Leucopogon compactus =

Conservation status
- Priority Four — Rare Taxa (DEC)

Scientific classification
- Kingdom: Plantae
- Clade: Tracheophytes
- Clade: Angiosperms
- Clade: Eudicots
- Clade: Asterids
- Order: Ericales
- Family: Ericaceae
- Genus: Leucopogon
- Species: L. compactus

Binomial name
- Leucopogon compactus Stschegl.
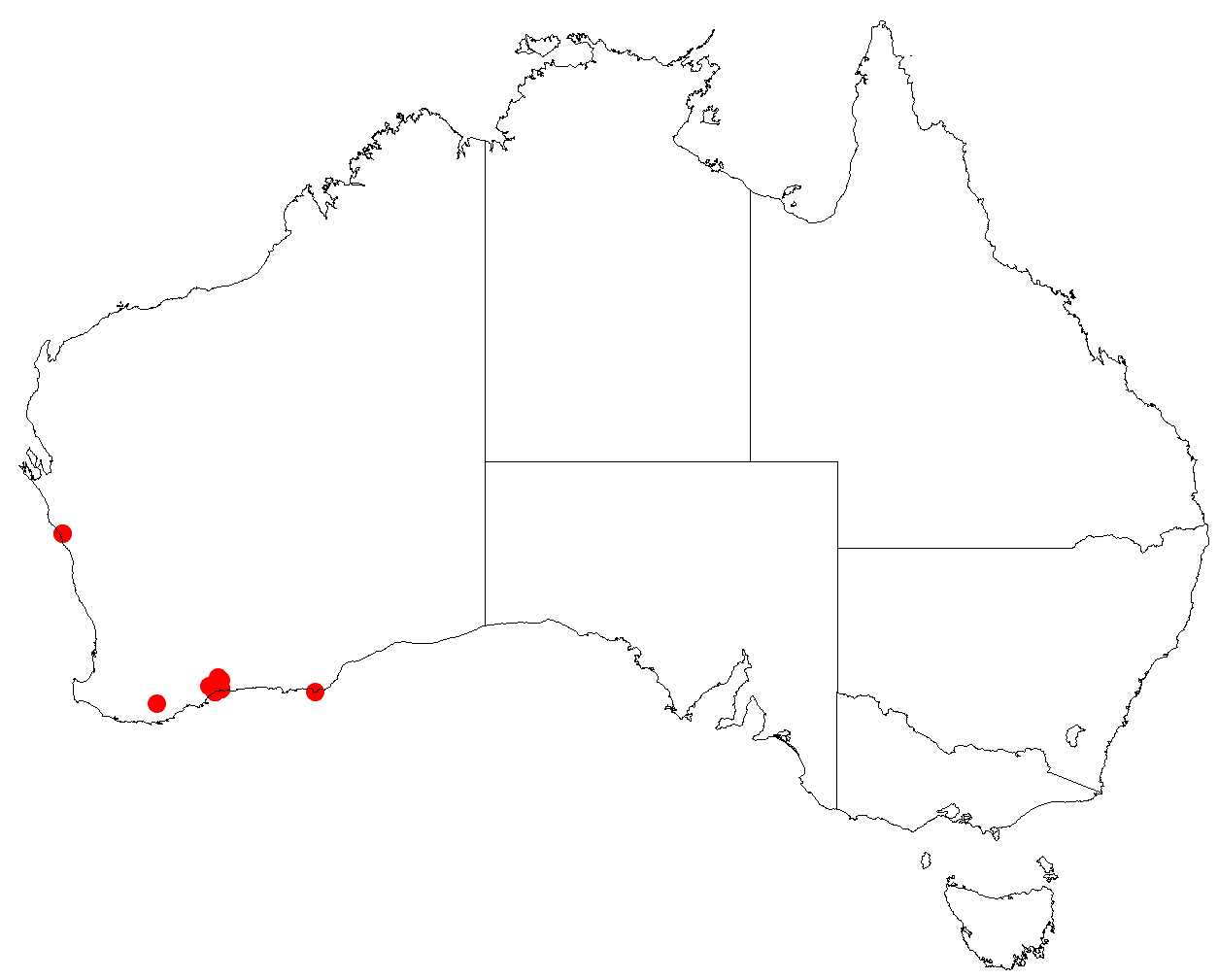
- Occurrence data from AVH

Synonyms
- Styphelia compacta (Stschegl.) F.Muell.; Styphelia commutata Sleumer

Species of plant

Leucopogon compactus is a species of flowering plant in the heath family Ericaceae and is endemic to the south of Western Australia. It is an erect shrub with oblong leaves and dense clusters of white, tube-shaped flowers.

== Description ==
Leucopogon compactus is a shrub that typically grows to a height of 0.3–1 m (1 ft 0 in – 3 ft 3 in), its leaves and branches covered with grey, shaggy hairs. The leaves are oblong, mostly less than 12 mm (0.47 in) long with the edges rolled under. The flowers are white and arranged in dense clusters on the ends of branches and in upper leaf axils. The sepals are about 2.5 mm (0.098 in) long, with the bracts, covered with long hairs. The petals are about 4 mm (0.16 in) long and the lobes are longer than the petal tube. Flowering occurs from June to August or December.

== Taxonomy ==
Leucopogon compactus was first formally described in 1859 by Sergei Sergeyevich Sheglejev in the Bulletin de la Société impériale des naturalistes de Moscou. The specific epithet (compactus) means "compact" or "united".

== Distribution and habitat ==
This leucopogon grows on plains and hillslopes in the Esperance Plains bioregion of southern Western Australia.

== Conservation status ==
Leucopogon compactus is listed as "Priority Four" by the Government of Western Australia Department of Biodiversity, Conservation and Attractions, meaning that it is rare or near threatened.
