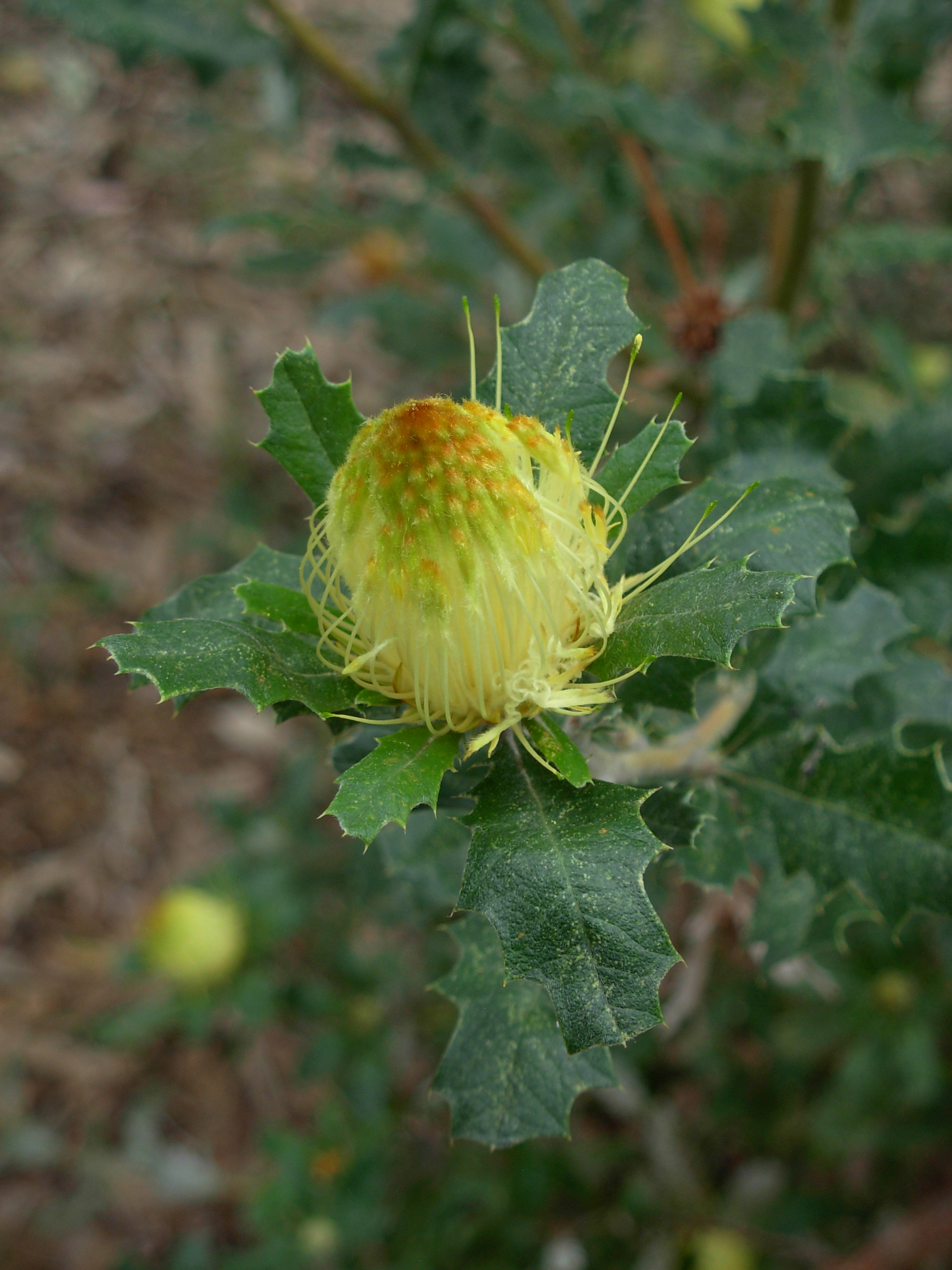

Scientific classification
- Kingdom: Plantae
- Clade: Tracheophytes
- Clade: Angiosperms
- Clade: Eudicots
- Order: Proteales
- Family: Proteaceae
- Genus: Banksia
- Subgenus: Banksia subg. Banksia
- Series: Banksia ser. Dryandra
- Species: B. undata

Binomial name
- Banksia undata A.R.Mast & K.R.Thiele

Synonyms
- Dryandra praemorsa Meisn.; Josephia praemorsa (Meisn.) Kuntze

= Banksia undata =

Urchin dryandra

Species of shrub endemic to Western Australia

Banksia undata, commonly known as urchin dryandra, is a species of shrub that is endemic to the southwest of Western Australia. It has sessile, wedge-shaped, wavy, serrated leaves, pale yellow flowers in heads of between 80 and 160, and later up to eight follicles in each head.

== Description ==
Banksia undata is a shrub that typically grows to a height of 3 m (9.8 ft) but does not form a lignotuber. It has wavy, serrated, wedge-shaped leaves that are 25–110 mm (0.98–4.33 in) long and 10–60 mm (0.39–2.36 in) wide and sessile or on a very short petiole. There are between four and nine irregular teeth on each side of the leaves. The flowers are pale yellow, arranged in heads of between 80 and 160 with hairy egg-shaped to narrow lance-shaped involucral bracts 12–15 mm (0.47–0.59 in) long at the base of each head. The perianth is 30–38 mm (1.2–1.5 in) long, sometimes pinkish, and the pistil 31–52 mm (1.2–2.0 in) long. Flowering occurs from July to October up to eight egg-shaped to elliptical follicles, 12–15 mm (0.47–0.59 in) long form in each head.

== Taxonomy and naming ==
This species was first formally described in 1848 by Swiss botanist Carl Meissner who gave it the name Dryandra praemorsa and published the description in Lehmann's Plantae Preissianae from specimens collected by James Drummond near the Swan River.

In 1996, Alex George describe two varieties of D. praemorsa:

- Dryandra praemorsa var. praemorsa that has a pistil 30–38 mm (1.2–1.5 in) long and leaves usually 25–60 mm (0.98–2.36 in) long and 10–40 mm (0.39–1.57 in) wide;
- Dryandra praemorsa var. splendens that has a pistil 47–52 mm (1.9–2.0 in) long and leaves usually 40–110 mm (1.6–4.3 in) long and 25–60 mm (0.98–2.36 in) wide.

In 2007 Austin Mast and Kevin Thiele transferred all dryandras to the genus Banksia. As there was already a plant named Banksia praemorsa (cut-leaf banksia), Mast and Thiele were forced to choose a new specific epithet; their choice, "undata", is from the Latin undatus ("undulate"), in reference to the wavy leaves. The names of the two varieties, var. splendens and var. undata are accepted by the Australian Plant Census.

== Distribution and habitat ==
Urchin dryandra occurs between Clackline, Dwellingup and Bannister where it grows in jarrah forest. Variety splendens is found from the Brookton Highway south to Bannister and var. undata between Clackline and Dwellingup.

== Ecology ==
An assessment of the potential impact of climate change on this species found that its range is likely to contract by between 50% and 80% by 2080, depending on the severity of the change.

== Conservation status ==
Banksia undata and its two varieties are classified as "not threatened" by the Western Australian Government Department of Parks and Wildlife.
