= List of acts of the Parliament of Western Australia from 1995 =

This is a list of acts of the Parliament of Western Australia for the year 1995.

== 1995 ==
Short title, or popular name	Citation	Royal assent
Long title
Industrial Legislation Amendment Act 1995	No. 1 of 1995	9 May 1995
An Act to amend the—: Industrial Relations Act 1979; (Note: Industrial Relations Act 1979 (No. 114)); Workplace Agreements Act 1993; (Note: Workplace Agreements Act 1993 (No. 13)); Education Act 1928; (Note: Education Act 1928 (No. 33)) and; Salaries and Allowances Act 1975, (Note: Salaries and Allowances Tribunal Act 1975 (No. 27)); and to amend various other Acts for consequential or related purposes.
Water Corporation Act 1995 or the Water Corporations Act 1995	No. 70 of 1995	27 December 1995
An Act to establish a corporation with the function of providing water services, and with functions necessary for and related to that purpose, and for connected purposes.
Water and Rivers Commission Act 1995	No. 71 of 1995	27 December 1995
An Act to establish a Commission with functions relating to water resources, including functions under various written laws, and for connected purposes.
Water Services Coordination Act 1995 or the Water Services Licensing Act 1995 or the Plumbers Licensing Act 1995	No. 72 of 1995	27 December 1995
An Act to establish a scheme for the licensing of water services, to provide for a public officer—: to administer the licensing scheme; to coordinate and advise on water services policy; and; to perform functions under certain written laws relating to the provision of water services, and to confer powers and make related provisions.
Water Agencies Restructure (Transitional and Consequential Provisions) Act 1995	No. 73 of 1995	27 December 1995
An Act to amend the Water Authority Act 1984, (Note: Water Authority Act 1984 (No. 3)) the Waterways Conservation Act 1976 (Note: Waterways Conservation Act 1976 (No. 131)) and other Acts and to repeal the Western Australian Water Resources Council Act 1982 (Note: Western Australian Water Resources Council Act 1982 (No. 38)) as part of a scheme for the abolition of the Water Authority and the Waterways Commission and their replacement with—: a corporation to supply water services; a commission responsible for water resources; and; a public official to coordinate and regulate the provision of water services, to provide for the devolution of the assets and liabilities of the Water Authority and the Waterways Commission and for other transitional matters, and for related purposes.
Local Government Act 1995	No. 74 of 1995	9 January 1996
An Act to provide for a system of local government in Western Australia, to amend the Local Government Act 1960 (Note: Local Government Act 1960 (No. 84)) and for related purposes.
	No. X of 1995	
Industrial Relations Legislation Amendment and Repeal Act 1995	No. 79 of 1995	16 January 1996
An Act: to amend the following Acts—: Industrial Relations Act 1979; Legal Practitioners Act 1893; (Note: Legal Practitioners Act 1893 (57 Vict. No. 12)); Workplace Agreements Act 1993; Minimum Conditions of Employment Act 1993; (Note: Minimum Conditions of Employment Act 1993 (No. 14)) and; Long Service Leave Act 1958, (Note: Long Service Leave Act 1958 (No. 44)); to repeal the following Acts —: The Masters and Servants Act 1892; (Note: Masters and Servants Act 1892 (55 Vict. No. 28)); Truck Act 1899; (Note: Truck Act 1899 (63 Vict. No. 15)); Trade Unions Act 1902; (Note: Trade Unions Act 1902 (1 & 2 Edw. VII. No. 19)); Factories and Shops Act 1963; (Note: Factories and Shops Act 1963 (No. 44)); Salaries and Wages Freeze Act 1982; (Note: Salaries and Wages Freeze Act 1982 (No. 129)) and; Temporary Reduction of Remuneration (Senior Public Officers) Act 1983, (Note: Temporary Reduction of Remuneration (Senior Public Officers) Act 1983 (No. 7)); and consequentially amend other Acts, and for related purposes.

== Sources ==
- "legislation.wa.gov.au".
