= Lightning Swamp Bushland =

Bushland in Perth, Western Australia

Coordinates: 31.8691°S 115.9057°E

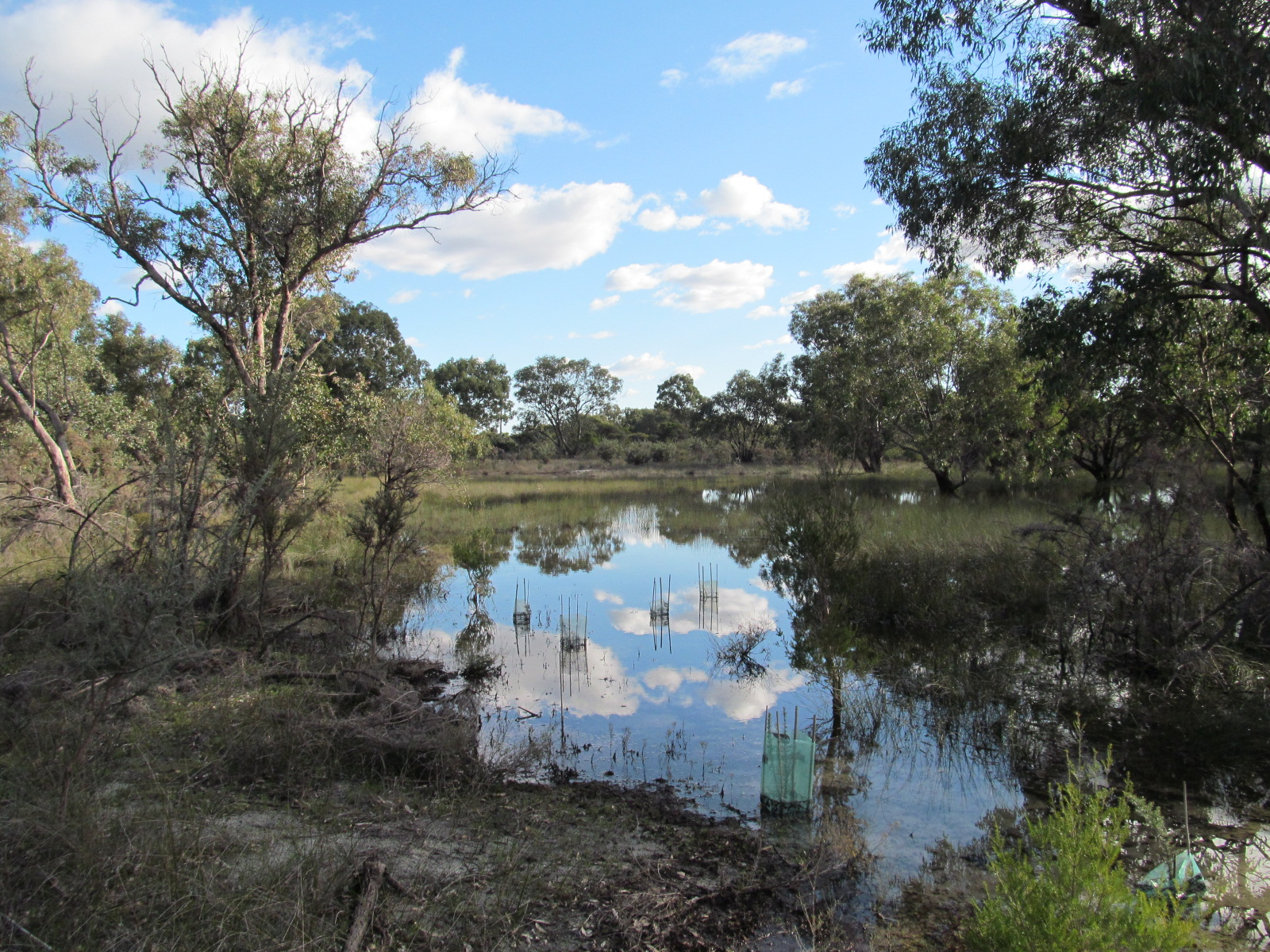
Wetlands at Lightning Swamp Bushland reserve

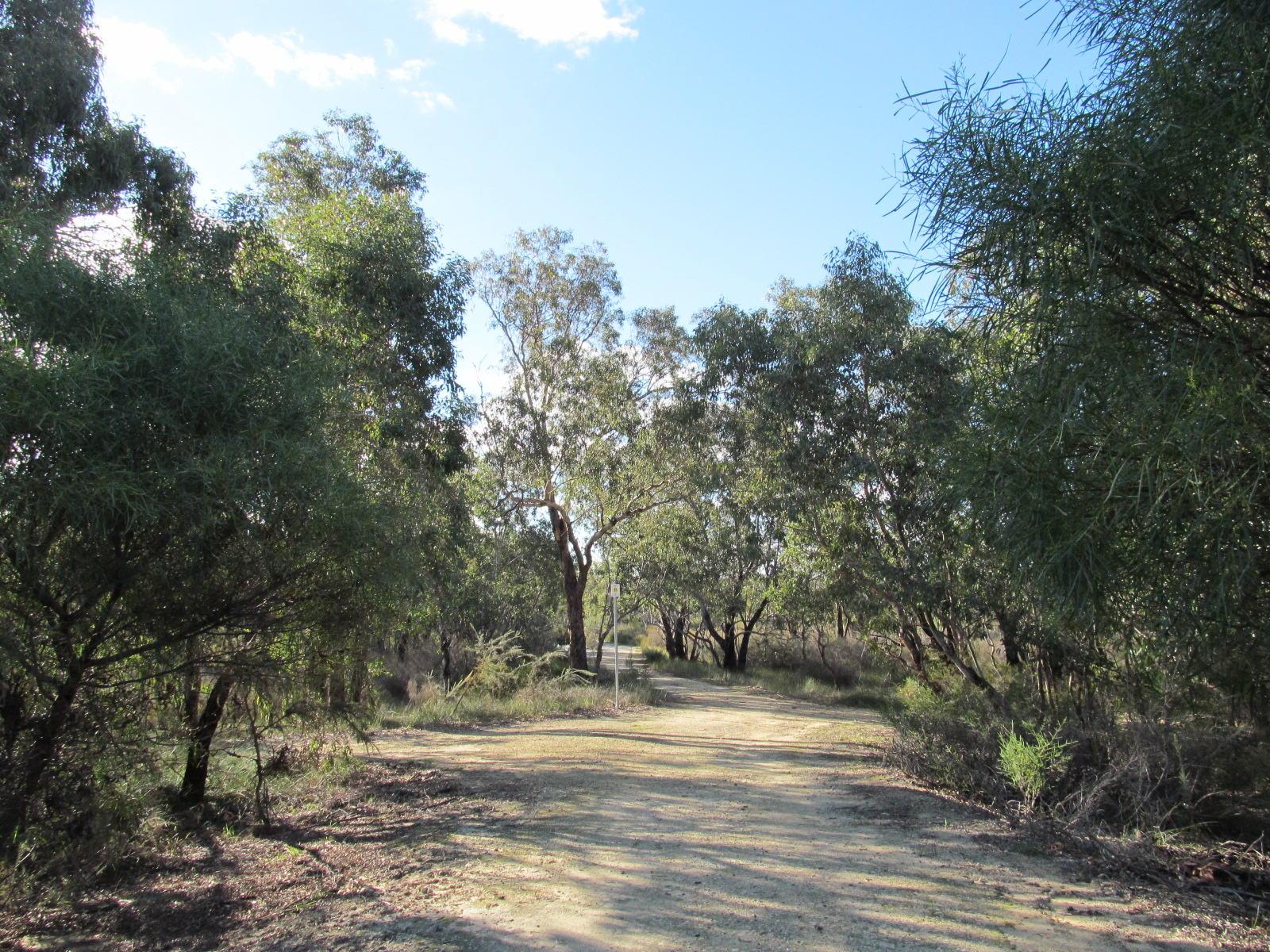
Trail at Lightning Swamp Bushland reserve

Lightning Swamp Bushland is a 71.3-hectare (176-acre) area of natural bush and wetlands in Noranda, Western Australia, a suburb of Perth. It is bounded by Reid Highway to the north, Malaga Drive to the west and south, Matthews Close to the south and Lightning Park Recreation Centre to the east. It is classified as an A class reserve.

The reserve contains several wetlands, one in the north-east and several in the south-east and south-west of the reserve. The north-eastern wetland is a Conservation Class 4 wetland. It contains water year-round due to its peaty clay base. It is a perched wetland (meaning it is not connected to groundwater), which is somewhat rare for the Swan Coastal Plain. The south-eastern and south-western wetlands are seasonal. An open stormwater drain managed by the Water Corporation flows along the length of the reserve and through them. This drain eventually flows into Bennett Brook.

Lightning Swamp Bushland was first reserved in 1963 as part of the initial edition of the Metropolitan Region Scheme. At the time, the surrounding area was undeveloped. The name comes from the lightning-attracting ironstone in the area. The adjacent suburb of Malaga takes its name from the Aboriginal name for ironstone. Prior to 2008, Lightning Swamp Bushland was only an unofficial name for the reserve, with the official name being "Lot 3003 Crown Reserve 46880", but in 2008, the Geographical Names Committee approved a request by the Cities of Bayswater and Swan to rename the reserve to its current name.

From 2000 to 2016, Lightning Swamp Bushland was part of the City of Swan, but managed by the City of Bayswater. On 1 July 2016, the portion of Noranda that was in the City of Swan was transferred to the City of Bayswater. One of the reasons for this was to make it easier for the City of Bayswater to manage the reserve.

Restoring the reserve is done by the City of Bayswater and Friends of Lightning Swamp Bushland. Works included fencing the perimeter of the reserve to keep out motorbikes and off-road vehicles, creating 3.6-kilometre (2.2 mi) of limestone track for people to walk or ride through the reserve whilst protecting it, planting native plants, controlling weeds and dieback, and creating a boardwalk next to the wetland.
