= List of acts of the Parliament of Western Australia from 1984 =

This is a list of acts of the Parliament of Western Australia for the year 1984.

== 1984 ==
Short title, or popular name	Citation	Royal assent
Long title
Supply Act 1984	No. 1 of 1984	17 May 1984
An Act to apply out of the Consolidated Revenue Fund the sum of $1,400,000,000 (Note: A$1,400,000,000 in 1984 is equivalent to A$4.85×10^{9} in 2022.) and from Moneys to Credit of the General Loan Fund $85,000,000 (Note: A$85,000,000 in 1984 is equivalent to A$294,000,000 in 2022.) to the Service of the Year ending 30 June 1985 and to apply out of the Public Account the Sum of $65,000,000 for the purpose of temporary advances to be made by the Treasurer.
Water Authority Act 1984 or the Water Agencies (Powers) Act 1984	No. 3 of 1984	18 May 1984
An Act to ~~establish the Water Authority of Western Australia; to provide for the constitution, maintenance and functions of that Authority and for a Board of Management; and for related purposes~~ vest powers in the Water Corporation, the Water and Rivers Commission and the Coordinator of Water Services, to make other provision in respect of their functions, and for related and other purposes.
Occupational Health, Safety and Welfare Act 1984 or the Occupational Safety and Health Act 1984	No. 101 of 1984	19 December 1984
An Act to promote and improve standards for occupational health, safety and welfare, to establish the Occupational Health, Safety and Welfare Commission, to facilitate the co-ordination of the administration of the laws relating to occupational health, safety and welfare and for incidental and other purposes.
	No. X of 1984	
Conservation and Land Management Act 1984	No. 126 of 1984	8 January 1985
An Act to make better provision for the use, protection and management of certain public lands and waters and the flora and fauna thereof, to establish authorities to be responsible therefor, and for incidental or connected purposes.
Unleaded Petrol Act 1984	No. 127 of 1984	8 January 1985
An Act to provide for the sale, supply and use of unleaded petrol and for connected purposes.

== Sources ==
- "legislation.wa.gov.au".
