= Water and Rivers Commission =

Agency overview
- Formed: 1 January 1996
- Dissolved: 31 December 2005
- Superseding agency: Department of Water
- Jurisdiction: Government of Western Australia
- Headquarters: Perth, Western Australia

The Water and Rivers Commission was an agency of the Government of Western Australia.

== History ==
The Water and Rivers Commission was established on 1 January 1996 pursuant to the Water and Rivers Commission Act 1995, to administer the act and other legislation relevant to development and conservation of Western Australia's water resources.

It joined with the Department of Environmental Protection and Western Australia's Keep Australia Beautiful Council to form the Department of Environment. This was later merged with the Department of Conservation & Land Management to form the Department of Environment & Conservation. Water responsibilities were split off into a separate Department of Water on 1 January 2006.
