= Department of Environment and Conservation (Western Australia) =

Defunct state government department of Western Australia

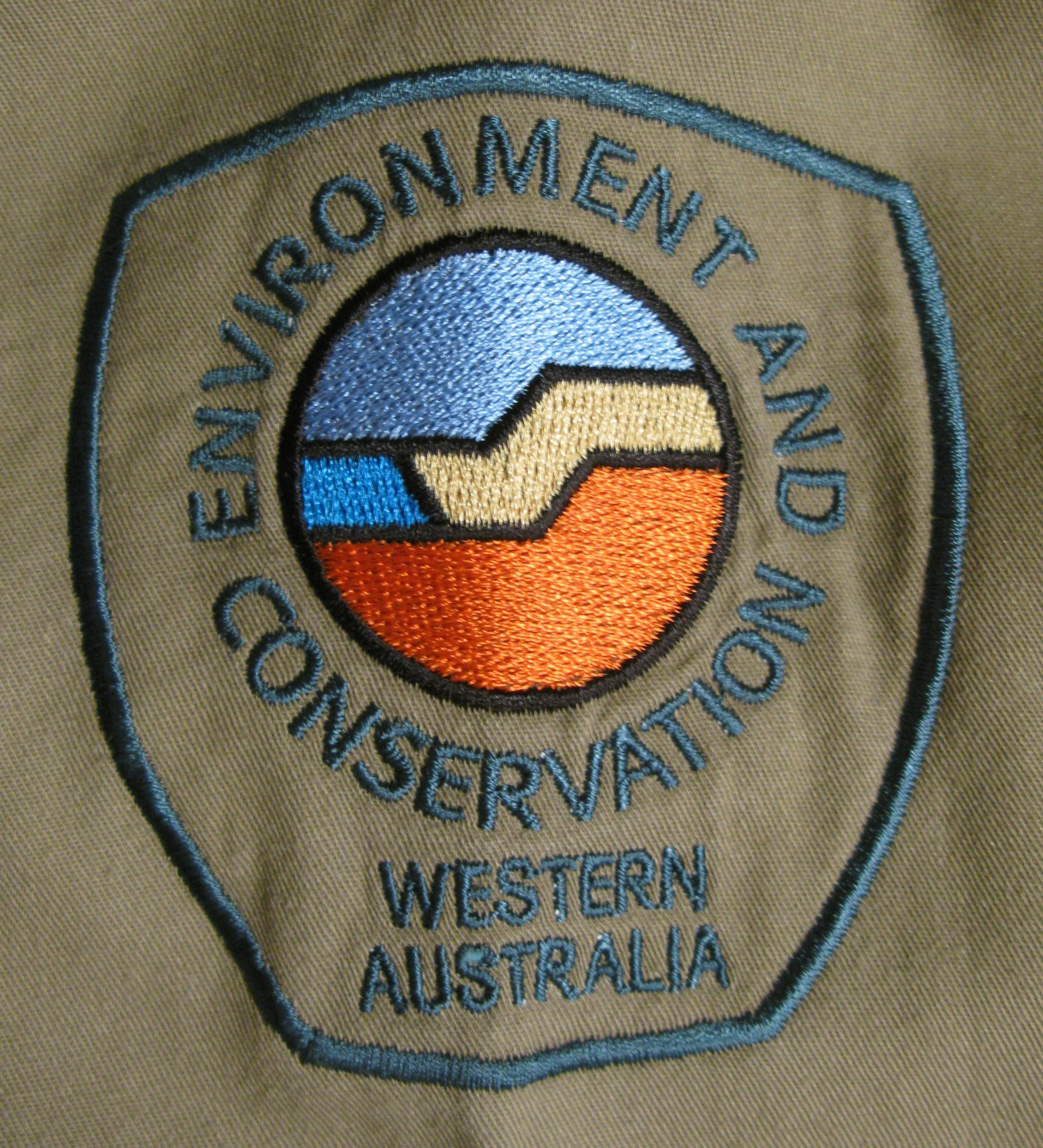
- Generic (Western Australia) shoulder patch for Western Australia Department of Environment and Conservation staff uniform

Agency overview
- Formed: 1 July 2006
- Preceding agencies: Department of Conservation and Land Management; Department of Environment
- Dissolved: 30 June 2013
- Superseding agency: Department of Parks and Wildlife and Department of Environment Regulation (DER)
- Jurisdiction: Government of Western Australia
- Agency executives: Keiran McNamara, Director general; Jim Sharp, Acting director general
- Parent agency: Department of Conservation and Land Management
- Child agency: Department of Parks and Wildlife
- Website: www.dec.wa.gov.au

The Department of Environment and Conservation (DEC) was a department of the Government of Western Australia that was responsible for implementing the state's conservation and environment legislation and regulations. It was formed on 1 July 2006 by the amalgamation of the Department of Environment and the Department of Conservation and Land Management.

The DEC was separated on 30 June 2013 forming the Department of Parks and Wildlife (DPaW) and the Department of Environment Regulation (DER), which both commenced operations on 1 July 2013.

On 1 July 2017 the DER amalgamated with the Department of Water and the Office of the Environmental Protection Authority, to become the Department of Water and Environmental Regulation, while DPaW was merged with other agencies to form the Department of Parks and Wildlife.

== Status (at dissolution, 30 June 2013) ==
The department was managing more than 285,000 km^{2}, including more than nine per cent of WA's land area: its national parks, marine parks, conservation parks, regional parks, state forests and timber reserves, nature reserves, roadside reserves and marine nature reserves. It provided visitor and recreation facilities at a sustainable level for many of these.

It also supported or worked closely with the following authorities:

- Environmental Protection Authority
- Conservation Commission of WA
- Keep Australia Beautiful
- Marine Parks and Reserves Authority
- Swan River Trust
- Waste Authority

The total reportable visitation to DEC-managed lands and waters during the 2012–13 financial year was 16.02 million, with visitor satisfaction levels of 88%.

4,717 people were registered volunteers with the department in 2012–13 that helped in a range of projects across the state with 564,350 hours contributed.

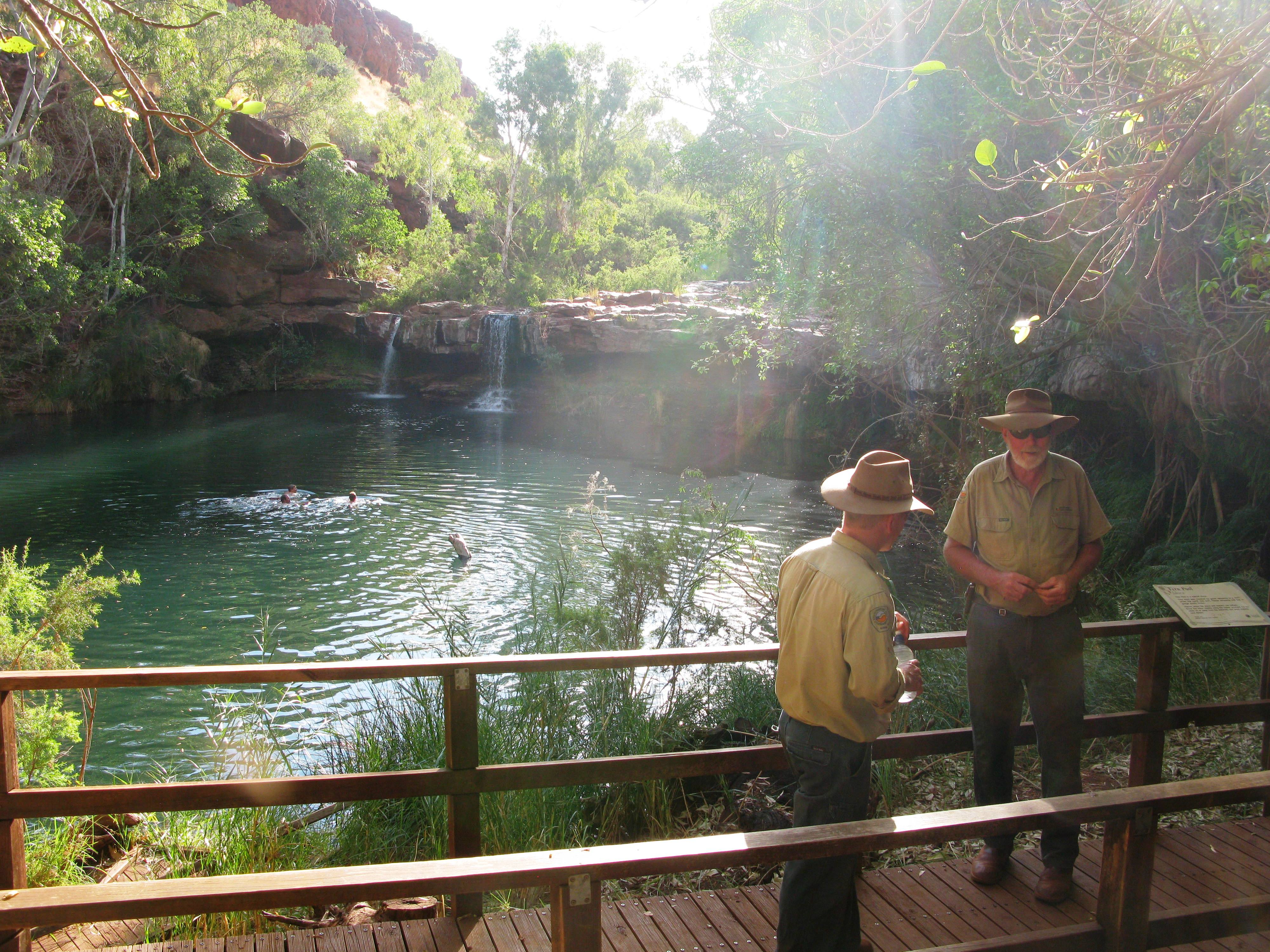
Department of Environment and Conservation national park rangers at Fern Pool, Karijini National Park, Pilbara in September 2012

DEC was responsible from 2007 to 2013 for protecting and conserving the state of Western Australia's environment; this included managing:

- State forests (1,304,442 ha)
- 99 national parks (6,246,692 ha)
- 16 conservation parks (847,578 ha)
- 13 marine parks (2,206,612 ha)
- 1 marine nature reserve (132,000 ha)
- nature reserves (10,244,167 ha)

As of 30 June 2013, the total area under Department of Environment and Conservation's care was 28,531,987 ha.

The department's key responsibilities also included roles in managing, regulating and assessing aspects of the use of the state's natural resources and biodiversity, including the regulation of native vegetation clearing and pollution control. The department initiated 14 environmental prosecutions during 2012–13, involving a broad range of charges including pollution, unauthorised clearing of native vegetation and illegal dumping. As of 30 June 2013, eight environmental prosecutions remained before the courts. There were an additional 18 pending cases that, subject to the evidentiary standard being met, could result in prosecution or other sanction.

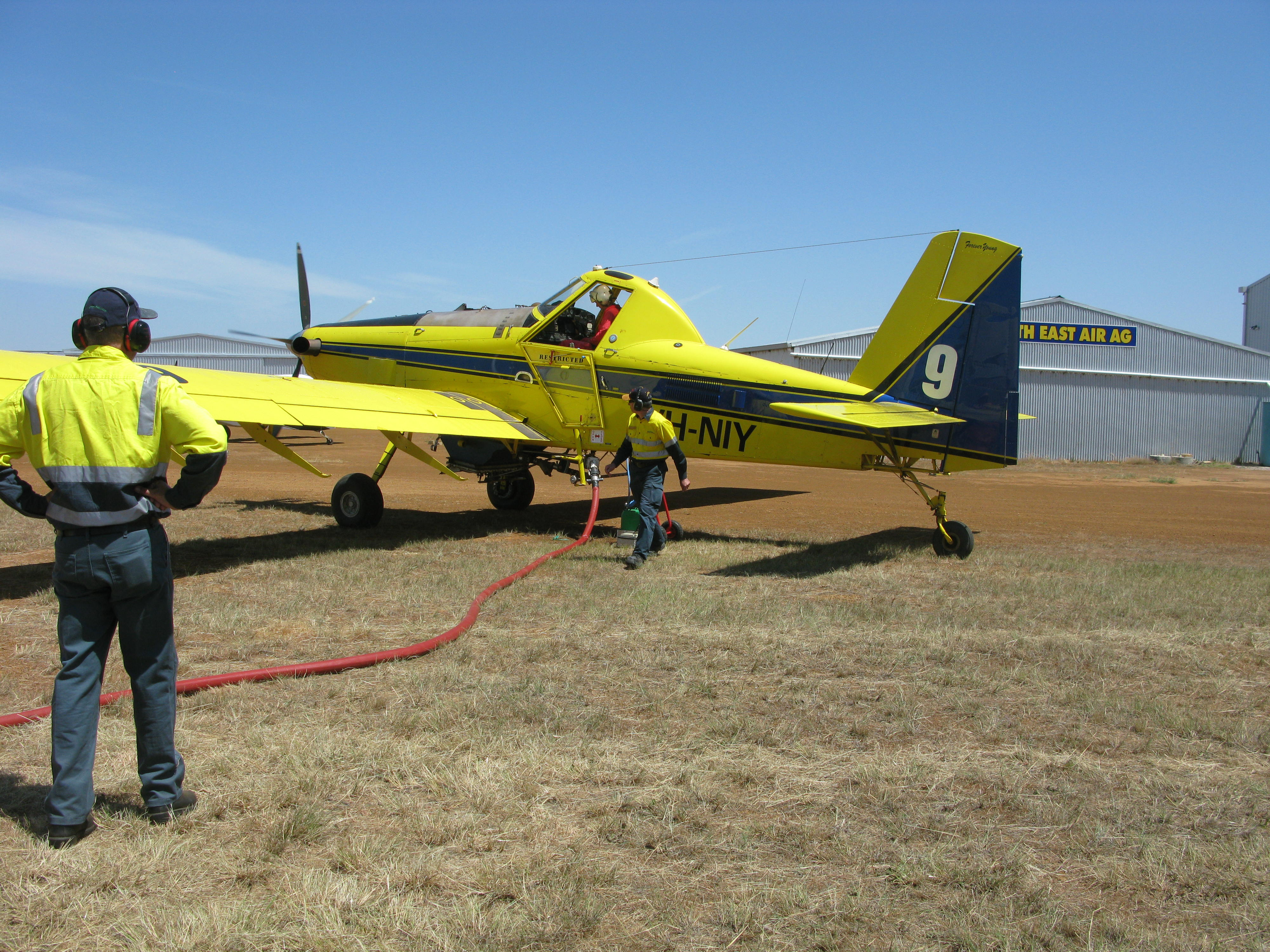
Air Tractor 602 water bomber, based in Albany on reloading at Esperance airport in November 2009

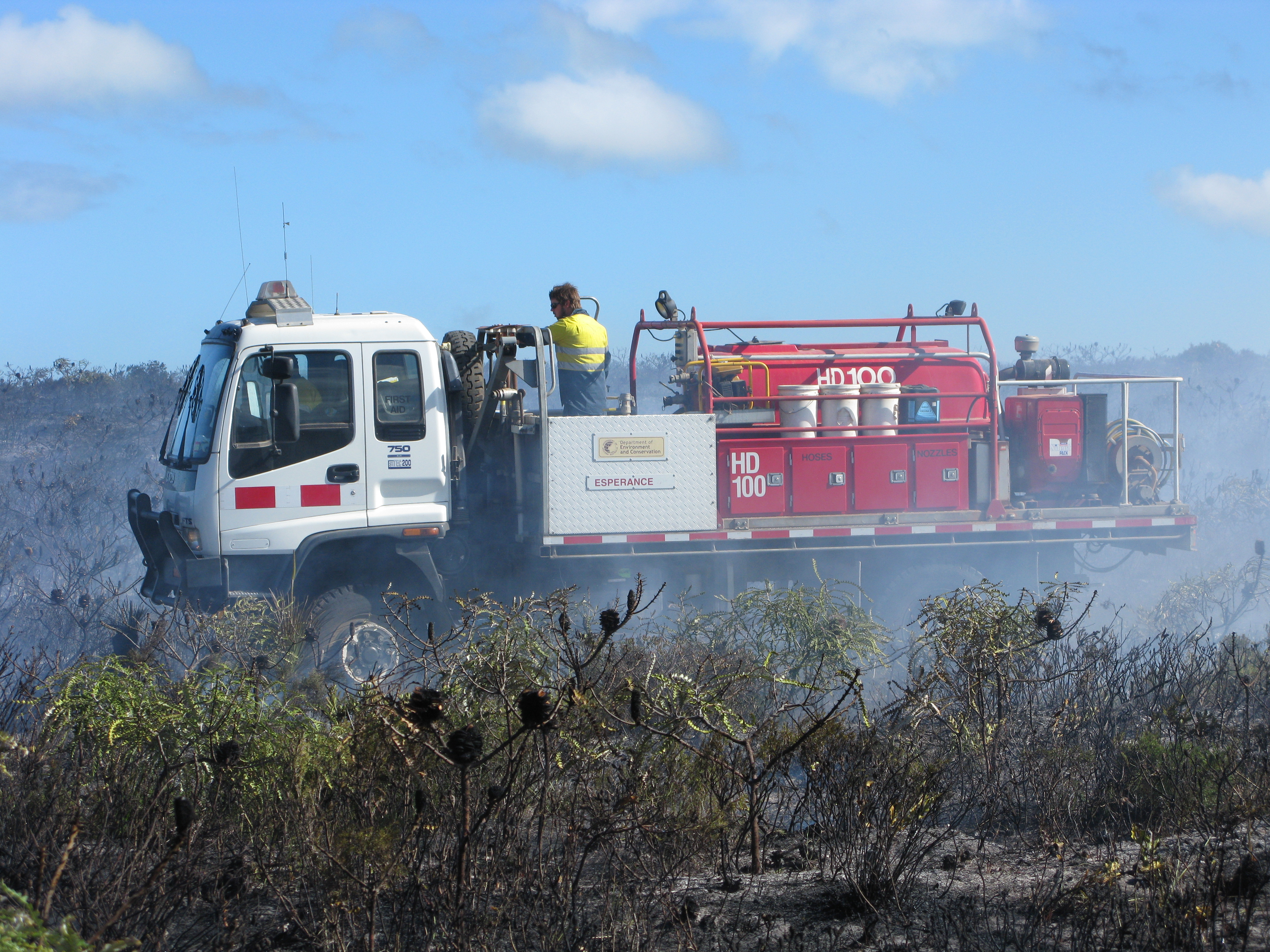
Fire appliance truck Isuzu 750 heavy duty #100 'Esperance 3.4' at Cape Le Grand National Park prescribed burn in May 2009 (Western Australia)

DEC was also responsible for the wildlife conservation project Western Shield.

The department was also in charge of wildfire prevention and suppression on its land as well as fire prevention in unallocated Crown land.

The indicative burn target for 2012–13 in the south-west forest regions was 200,000 hectares. In 2012–13, DEC achieved 23,468 hectares in the south-west forest regions, including about 6,410 hectares that were burnt for pine plantation protection.

The combination of unsuitable weather conditions, fuels remaining dry due to summer conditions extending into autumn, and enhanced requirements in prescribed burn planning and risk management as a result of the 2011 Margaret River bushfire contributed to a significant reduction of the area able to be prescribed burnt this year.

The average area of burning achieved over the past 10 years has been about 163,019 hectares per annum.

A further 6,023,884 hectares was burnt in the Kimberley, Pilbara, Goldfields, Midwest, Wheatbelt and South Coast regions. The burns were carried out on DEC-managed lands as well as on unallocated Crown lands and unmanaged reserves within these regions.

DEC staff attended and monitored 676 bushfires throughout the state in 2012–13, which burnt about 5,477,394 hectares. The causes of these fires were:

- lightning—28 per cent (above the 10-year average of about 24 per cent)
- deliberately lit or arson-caused fires—37 per cent (below the 10-year average of about 43 per cent)
- accidental fires—16 per cent
- escapes from private burns—4 per cent
- escapes from DEC burns—0 per cent
- other causes—4 per cent
- unknown—11 per cent.

Some of the most severe bushfires the department had to suppress, in chronological order, included:

Fire	Location	Area burned (1 ha ≈ 2.5 acres)	Date	Human fatalities	Livestock death/Properties damaged
Dwellingup bushfire	Western Australia	12,000 ha	4 February 2007	0	16
Boorabbin National Park bushfire	Western Australia	40,000 ha	30 December 2007	3	Powerlines and Great Eastern Highway, forced to close for 2 weeks
Toodyay bushfire	Western Australia	3,000+ ha	29 December 2009	0	38
Lake Clifton bushfire	Western Australia	2,000+ ha	11 January 2011	0	10 homes destroyed
Roleystone Kelmscott bushfire	Western Australia	1,500+ ha	6–8 February 2011	0	72 homes destroyed, 32 damaged, Buckingham Bridge on Brookton Highway collapsed and closed for 3 weeks whilst a temporary bridge was constructed and opened a month after the fires
Margaret River bushfire	Western Australia	4,000 ha	24 November 2011	0	34 homes destroyed including the historic Wallcliffe House
Carnarvon bushfire complex	Western Australia	800,000+ ha	27 December 2011 – 3 February 2012	0	11 pastoral stations (fences, watering systems, water points, stock feed).
Black Cat Creek bushfire	Western Australia	1,300 ha	12 October 2012	1 (DEC firefighter Wendy Bearfoot)	Private lands, pine plantations, Two Peoples Bay Nature Reserve.

== Preceding agencies ==
National parks (and the earlier forms) in Western Australia were under:

- Department of Lands and Surveys: 1 January 1890 – (partly split) 31 December 1895
- Wood and Forests Department: 1 January 1896 – 31 December 1918
- Forests Department: 1 January 1919 – 21 March 1985
- State Gardens Board: 15 December 1920 – 30 April 1957 (Parks and Reserves Act 1895)
- National Parks Board: 1 May 1957 – 30 July 1977
- Department of Fisheries and Fauna: 1 October 1964 – 31 December 1973
- National Parks Authority: 1 August 1977 – 15 April 1985 (National Parks Authority Act 1976)
- Wildlife section of the Department of Fisheries and Wildlife: 1 January 1974 – 21 March 1985
- Department of Environment: 1 July 2004 – 30 June 2006
- Department of Conservation and Land Management: 22 March 1985 – 30 June 2006 (Conservation and Land Management Act 1984)

== Vehicles ==
The department maintained and coordinated a range of specialist equipment and emergency response vehicles. This included pumpers, water bombers and tankers and other equipment relating to operations involving search and rescue and firefighting.

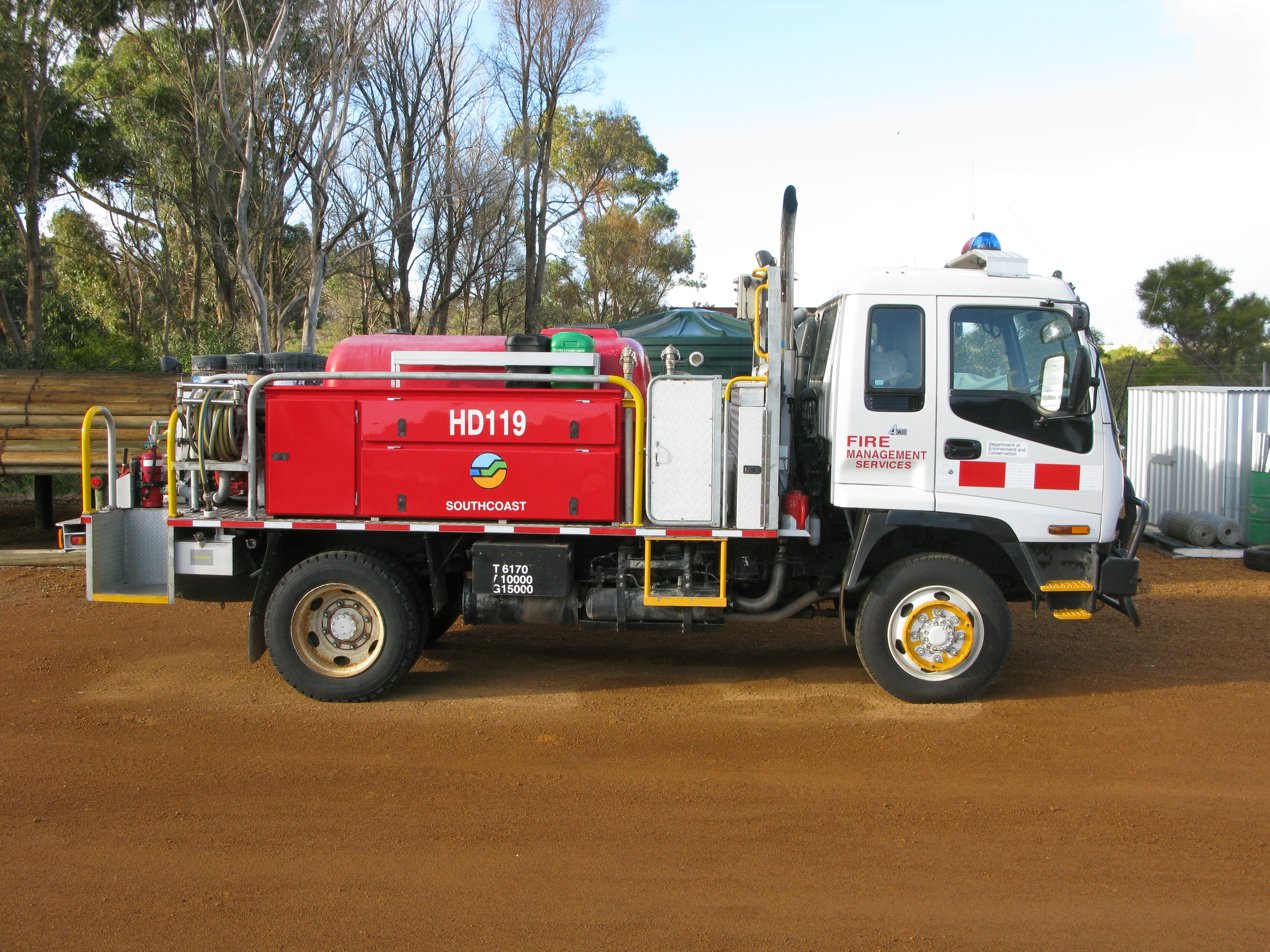
Heavy duty fire appliance Isuzu 550 (HD119 – Cape Le Grand) at Esperance depot, September 2010.

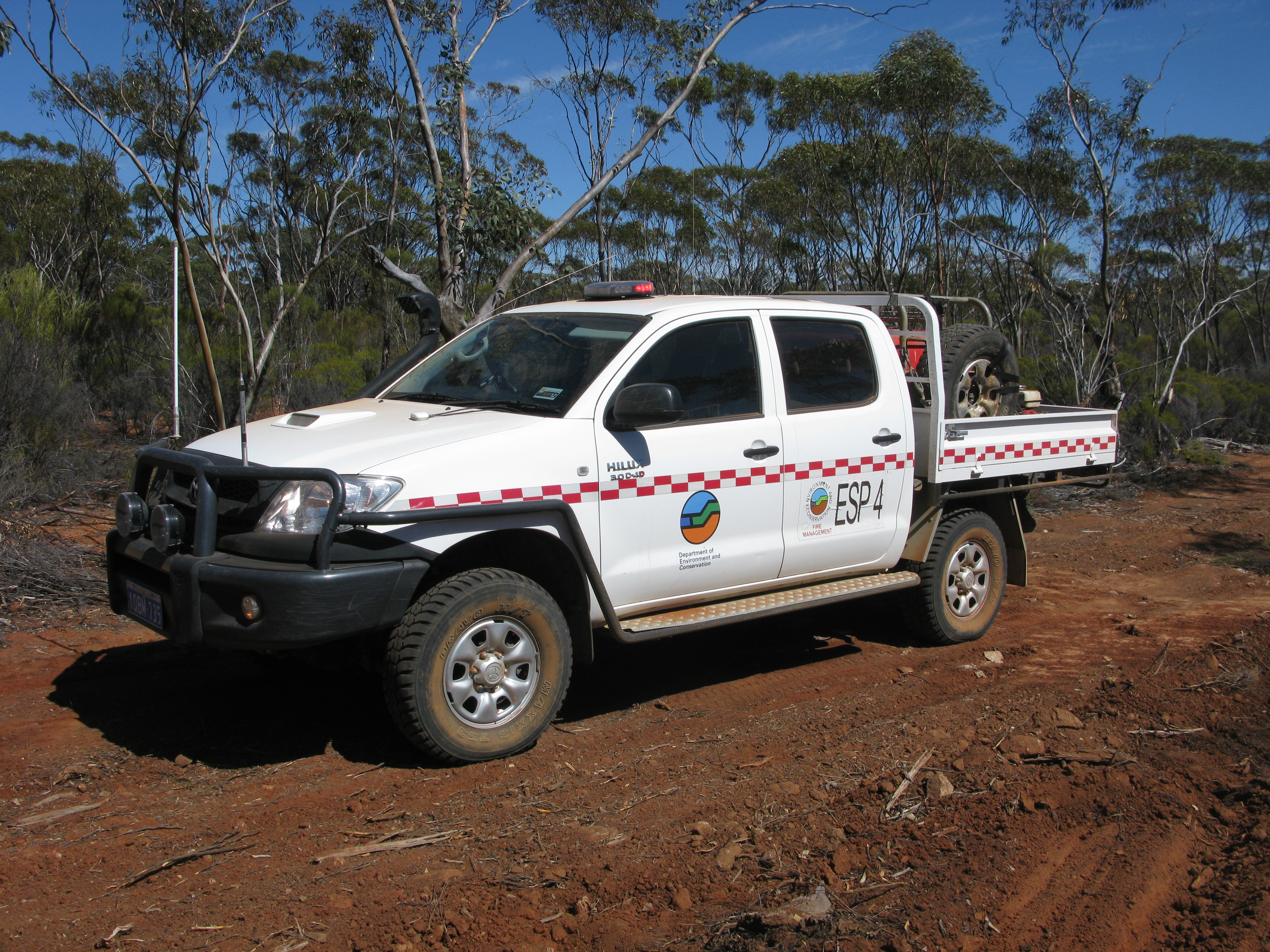
Toyota Hilux 3.0 D4D light patrol used by sector commander (ESP4) on ESP003 bushfire in Dundas Nature Reserve, December 2010.

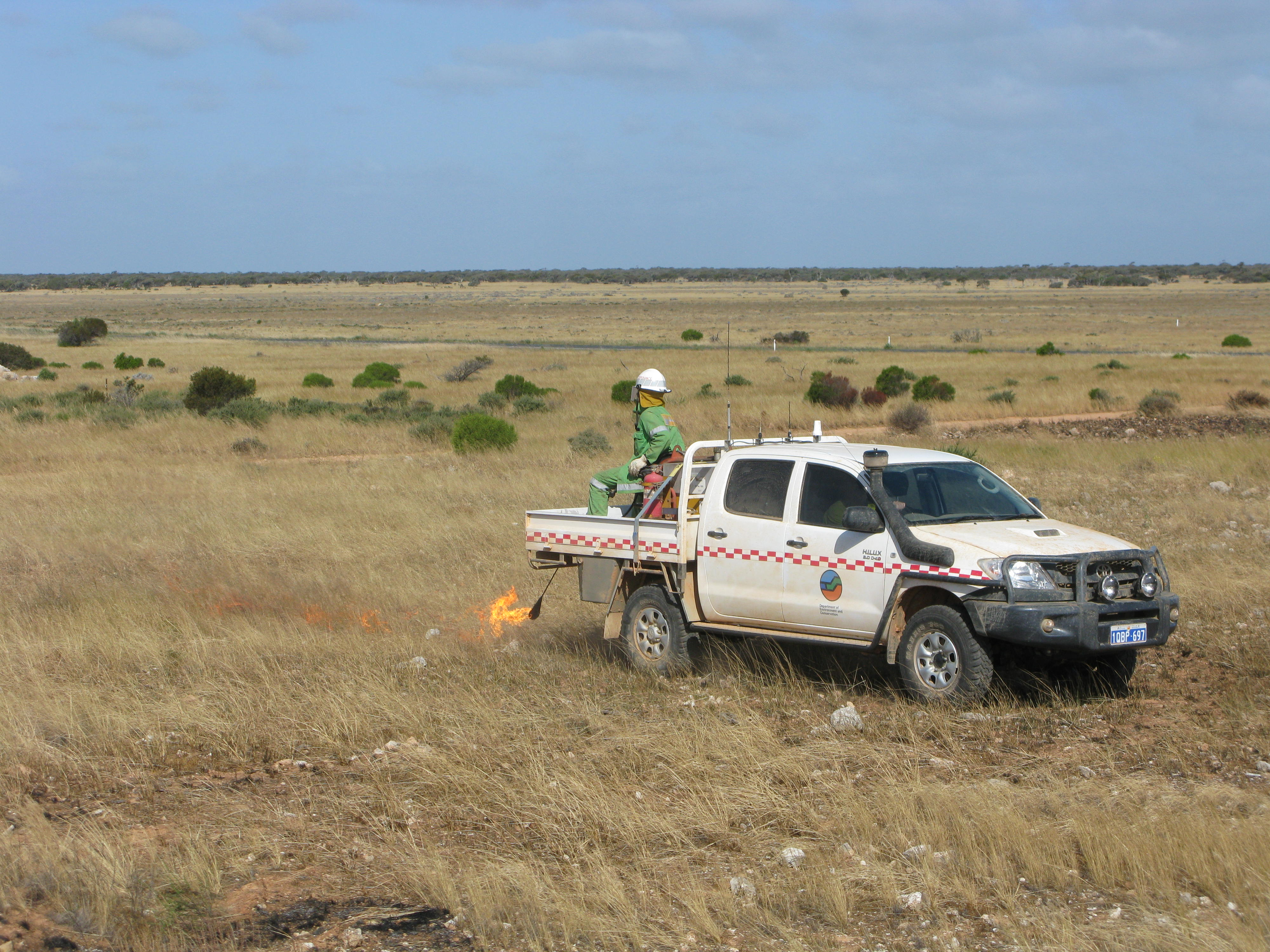
Toyota Hilux with flame-thrower at Eyre Highway buffer prescribed burn, Cocklebiddy, October 2010.

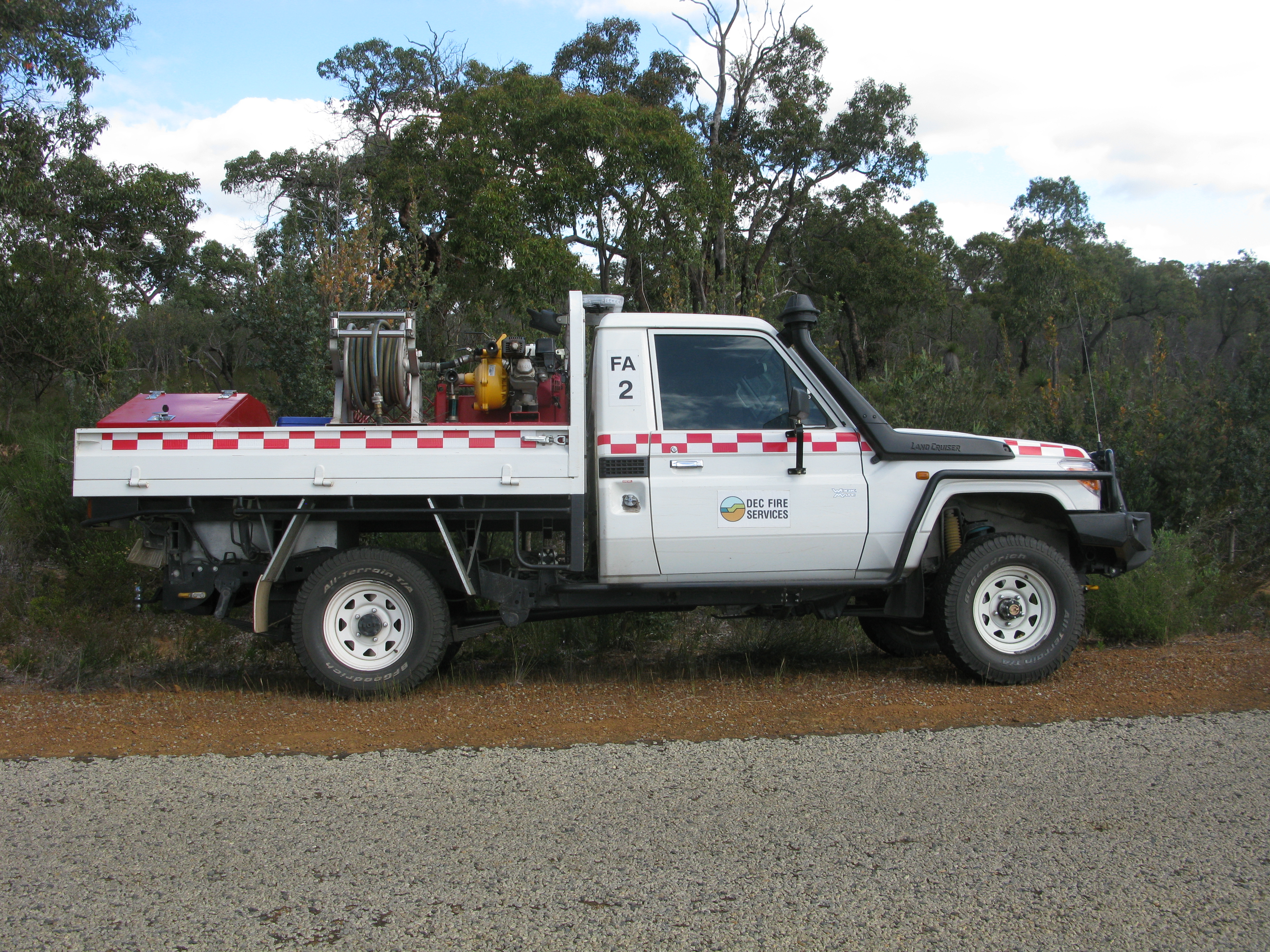
Toyota Landcruiser (FA2 – fire allowance officer in 2nd), Swan Coastal District, October 2013.

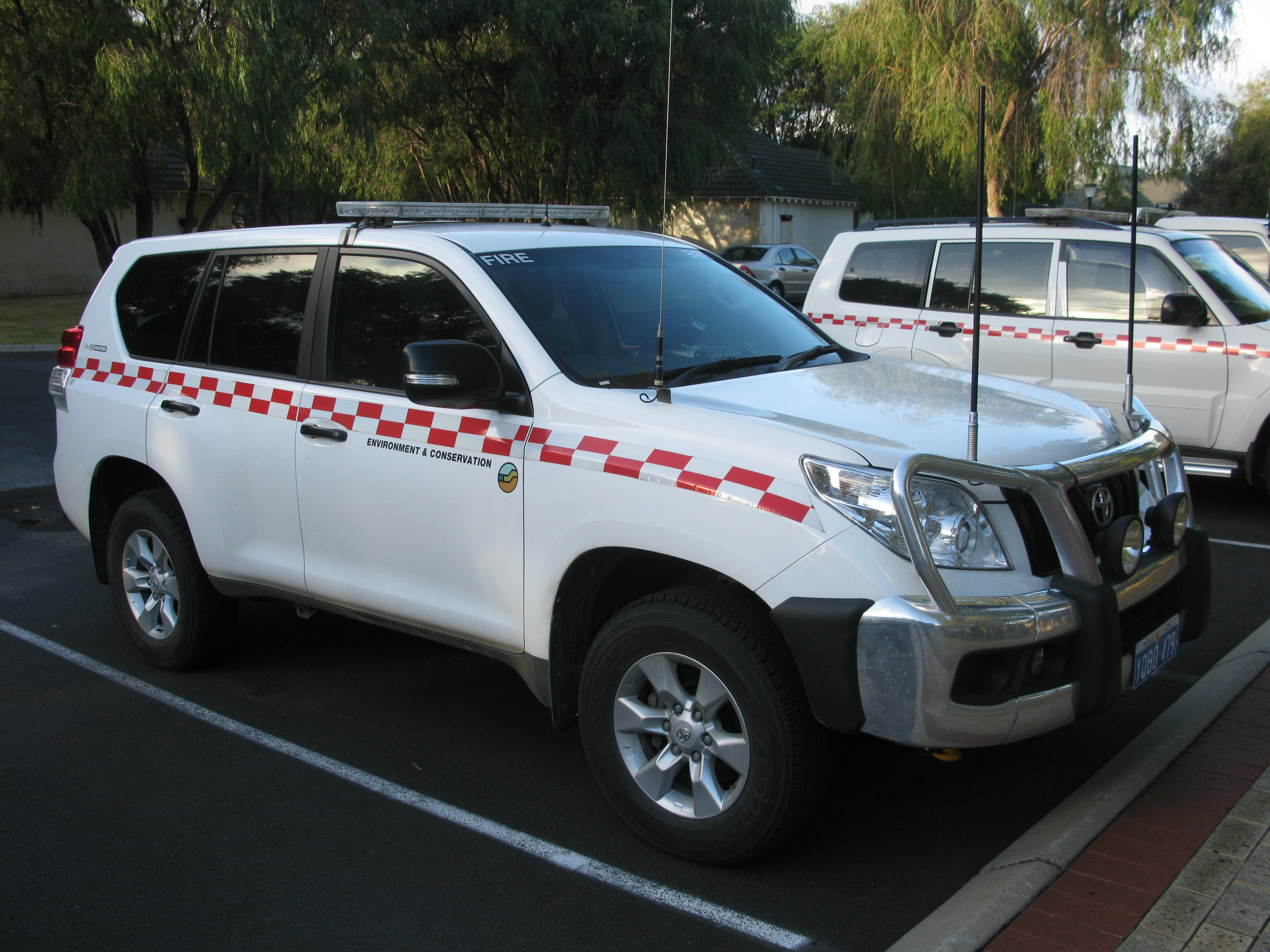
Toyota Landcruiser Prado for operations officer, Blackwood District, Busselton, August 2011.

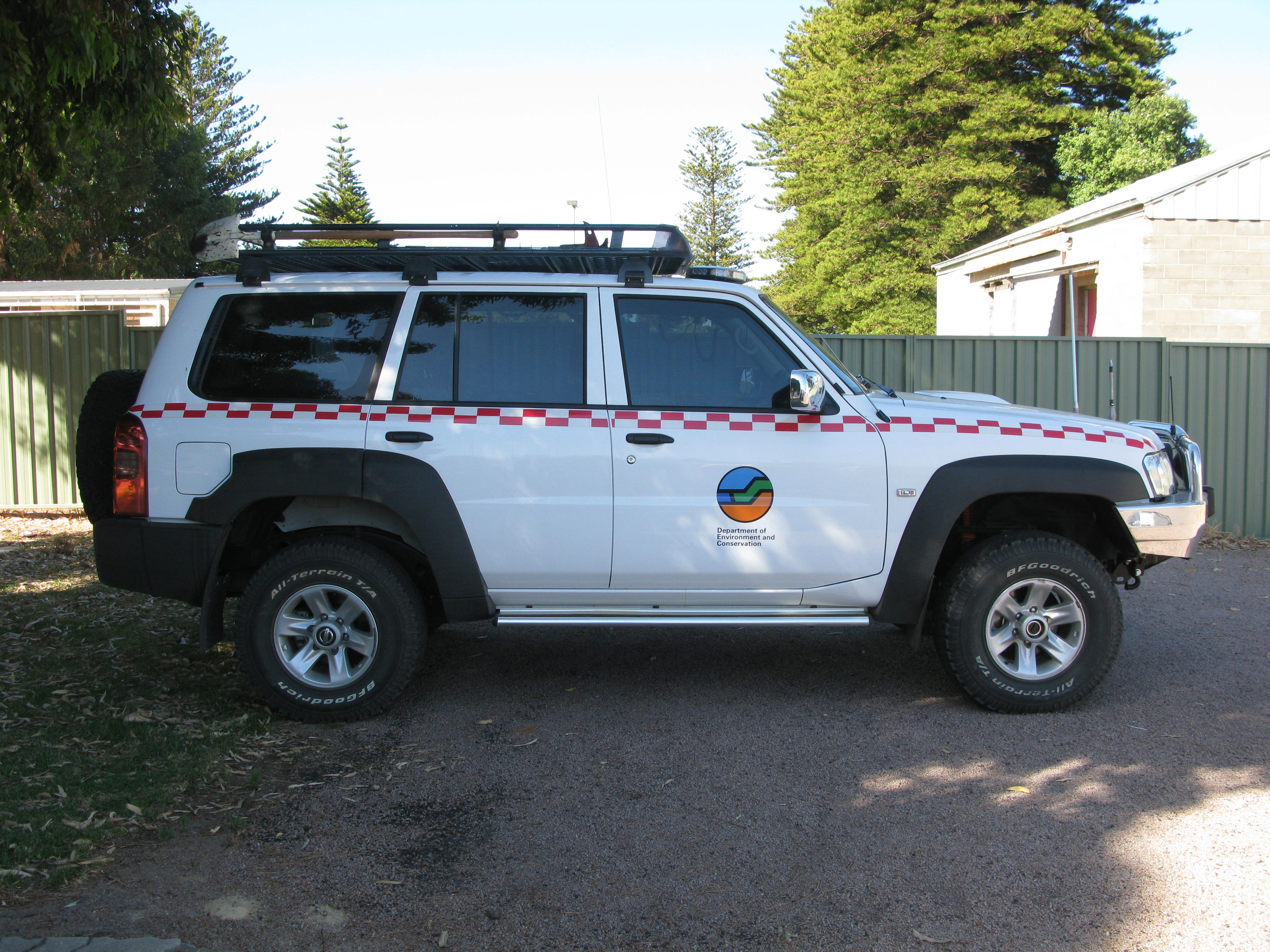
Nissan Patrol sector commander 4WD, Esperance office, January 2011.

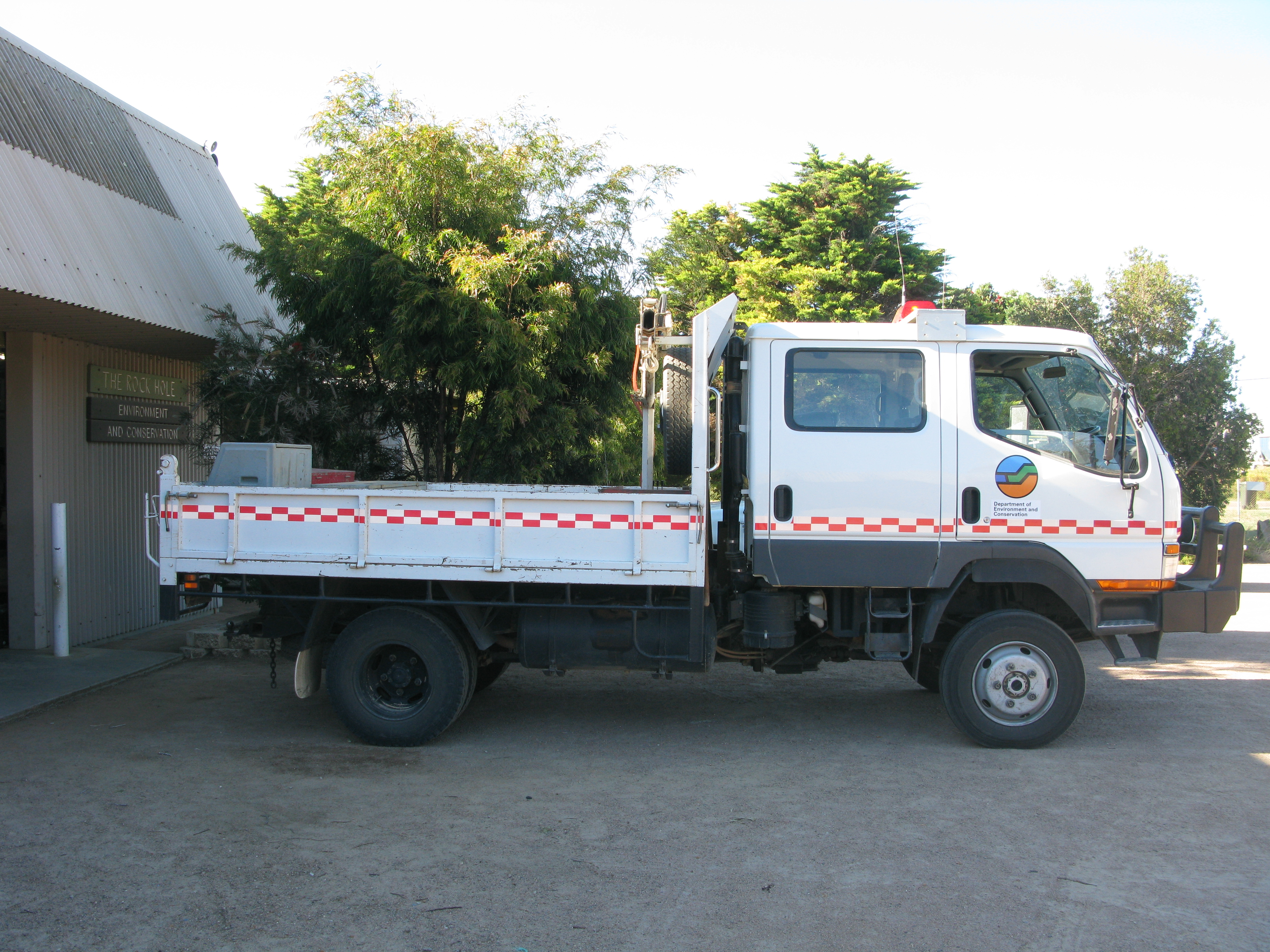
Mitsubishi Canter tender gang truck, Esperance depot, November 2010.

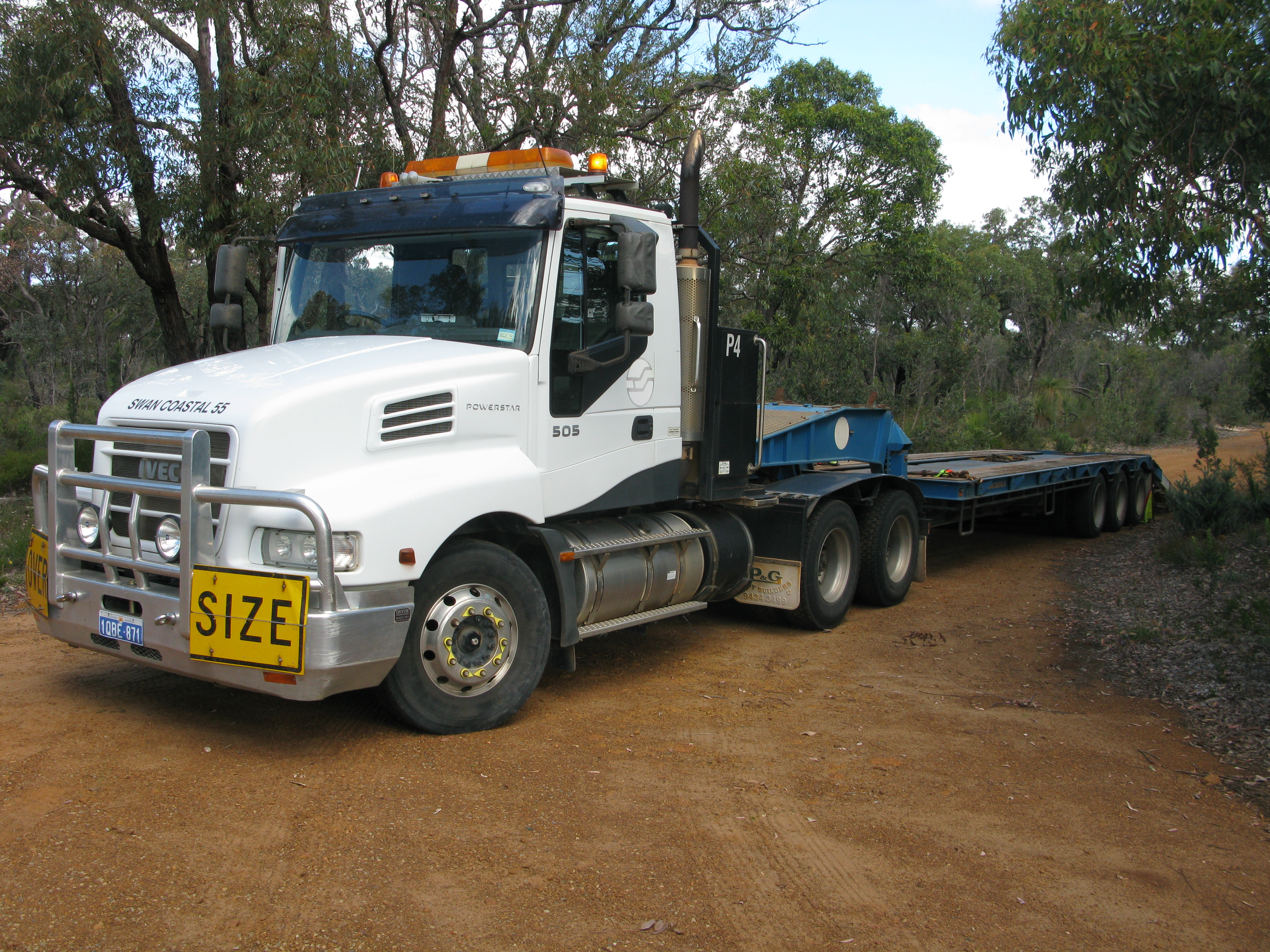
IVECO Float (plant P4 – Swan Coastal 55), Dwellingup, October 2013.

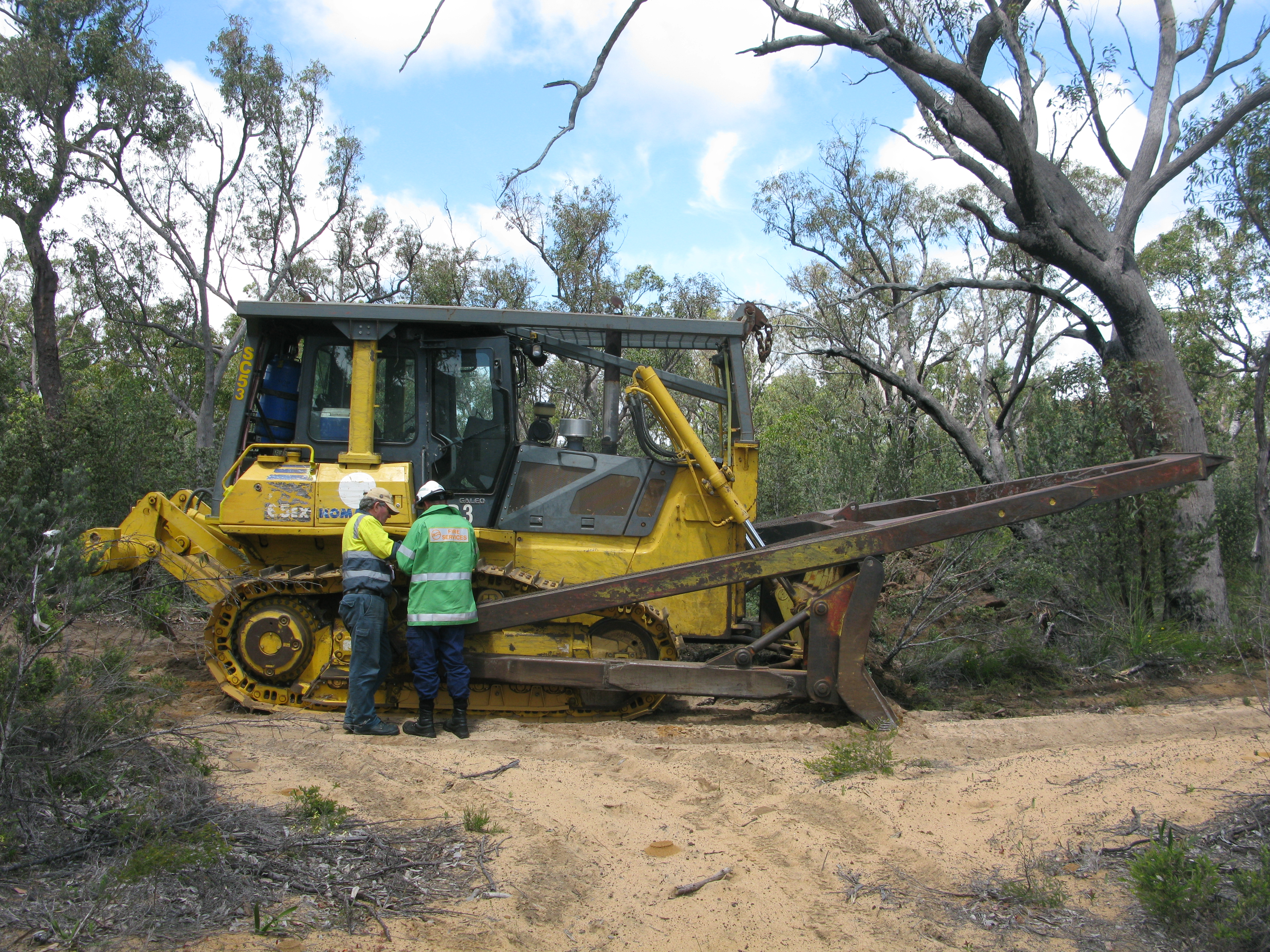
D6 5EX dozer (plant P3 – Swan Coastal 53), Moore River National Park, October 2013.

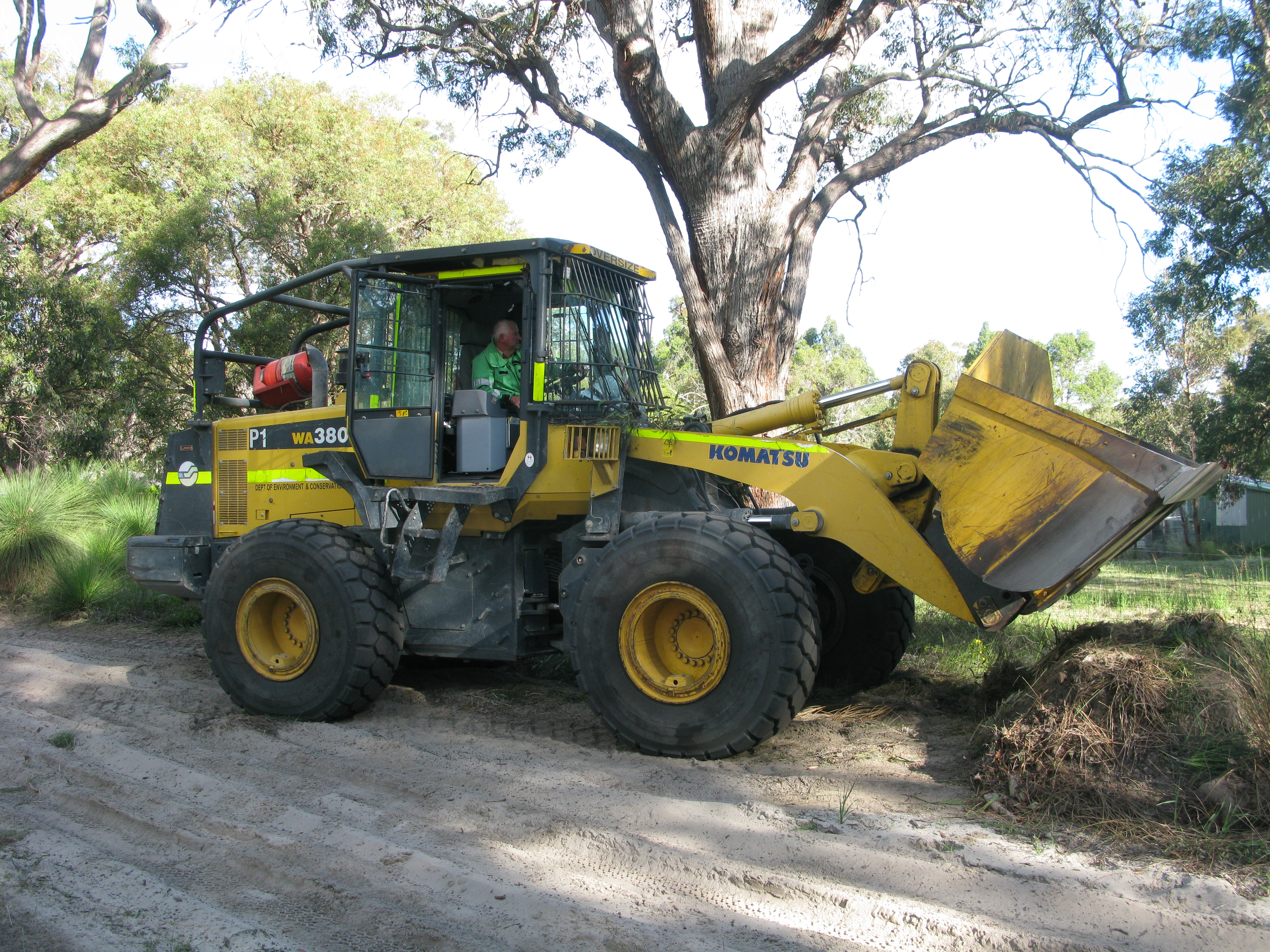
Front end loader (plant P1 – Swan Coastal 50), Swan Coastal District, October 2013.

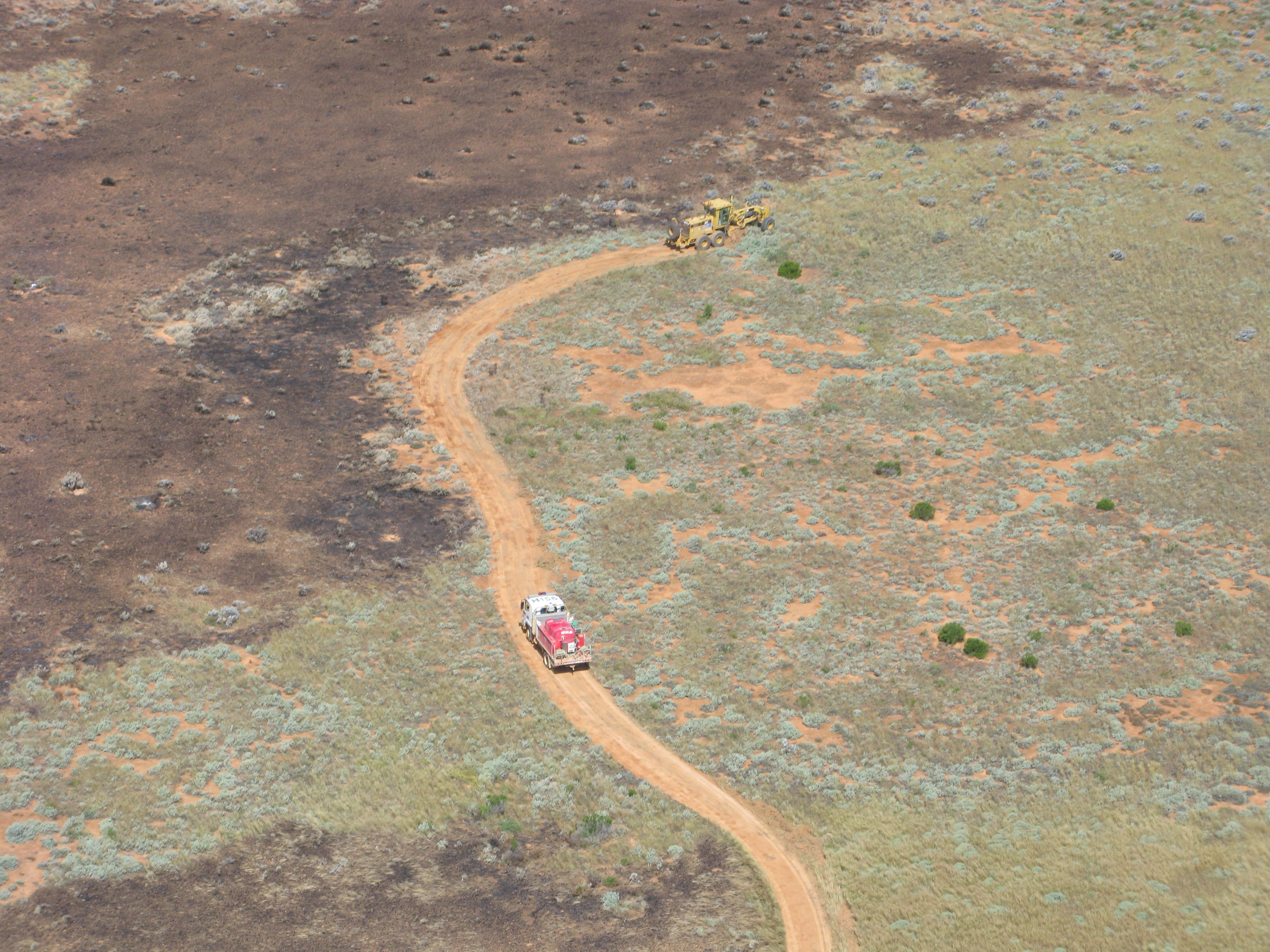
Grader opening a fireline by taking the fuel off the edge, followed by heavy duty fire appliance (HD156) in charge of its protection and avoiding hop overs. ESP001 bushfire at Mundrabilla, October 2011.

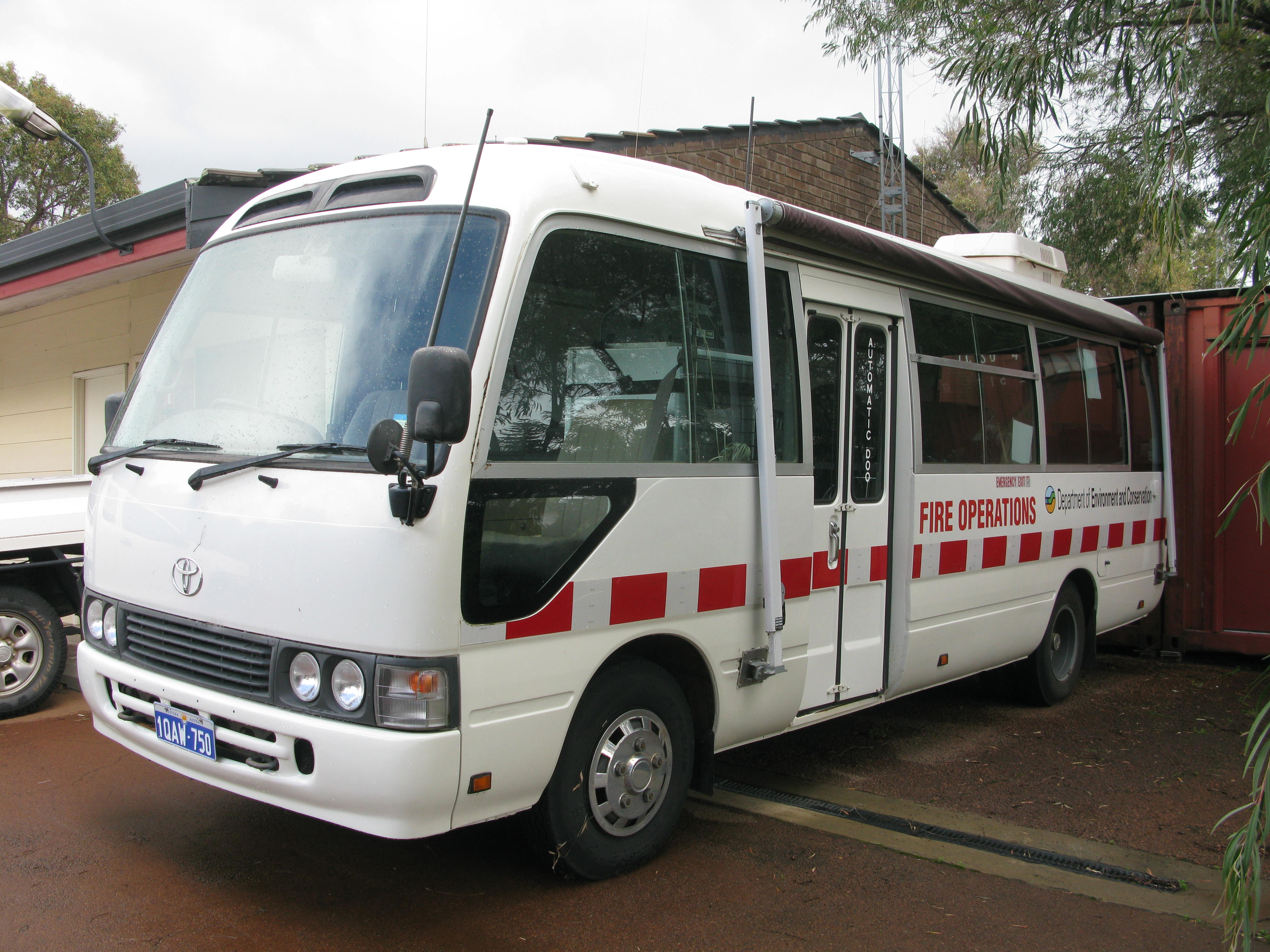
Toyota Coaster fire operations control van, Bunbury state facilities, August 2011.

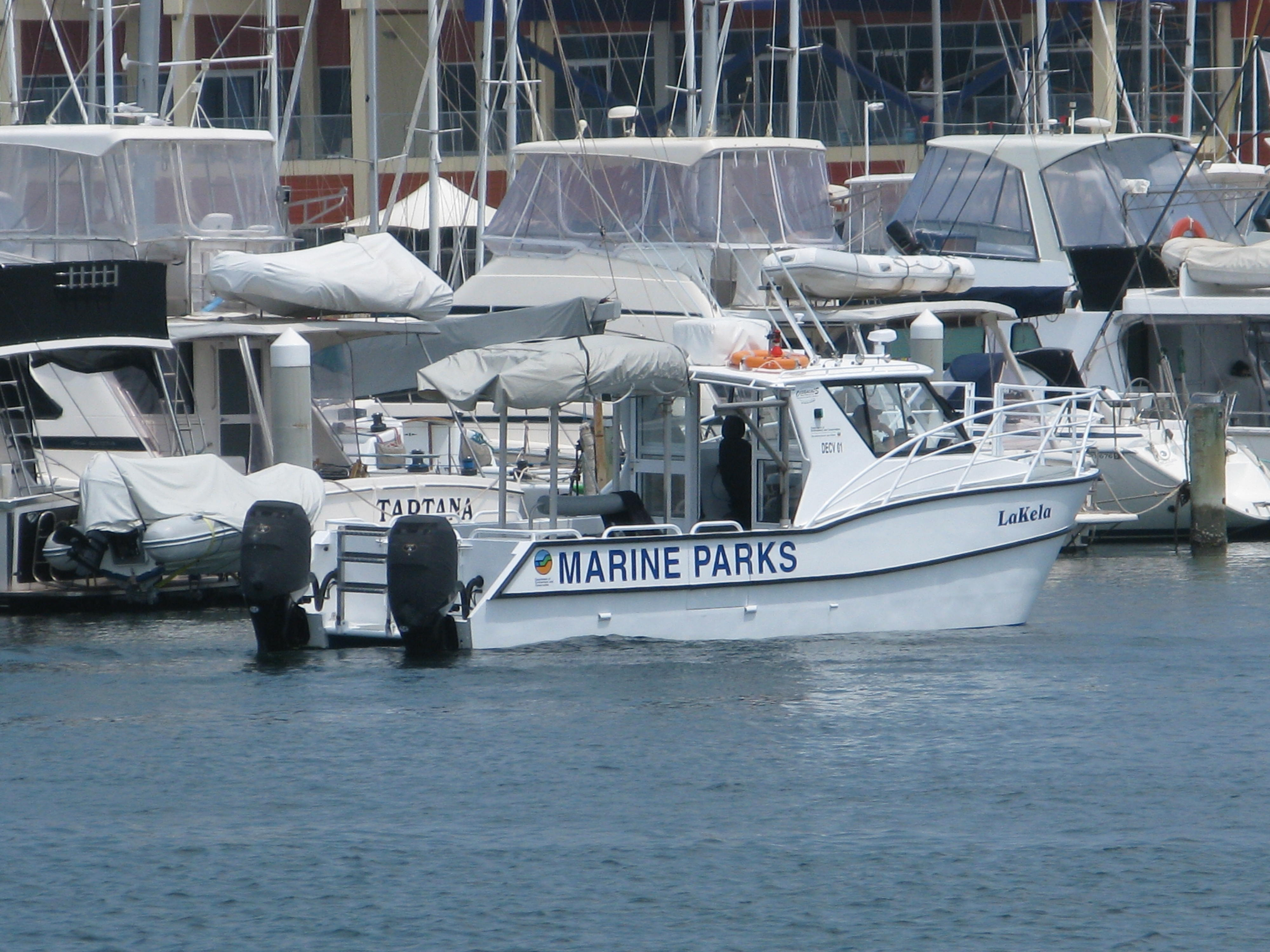
Marmion Marine Park vessel V61 "LaKela", Hillary Harbour, December 2009.

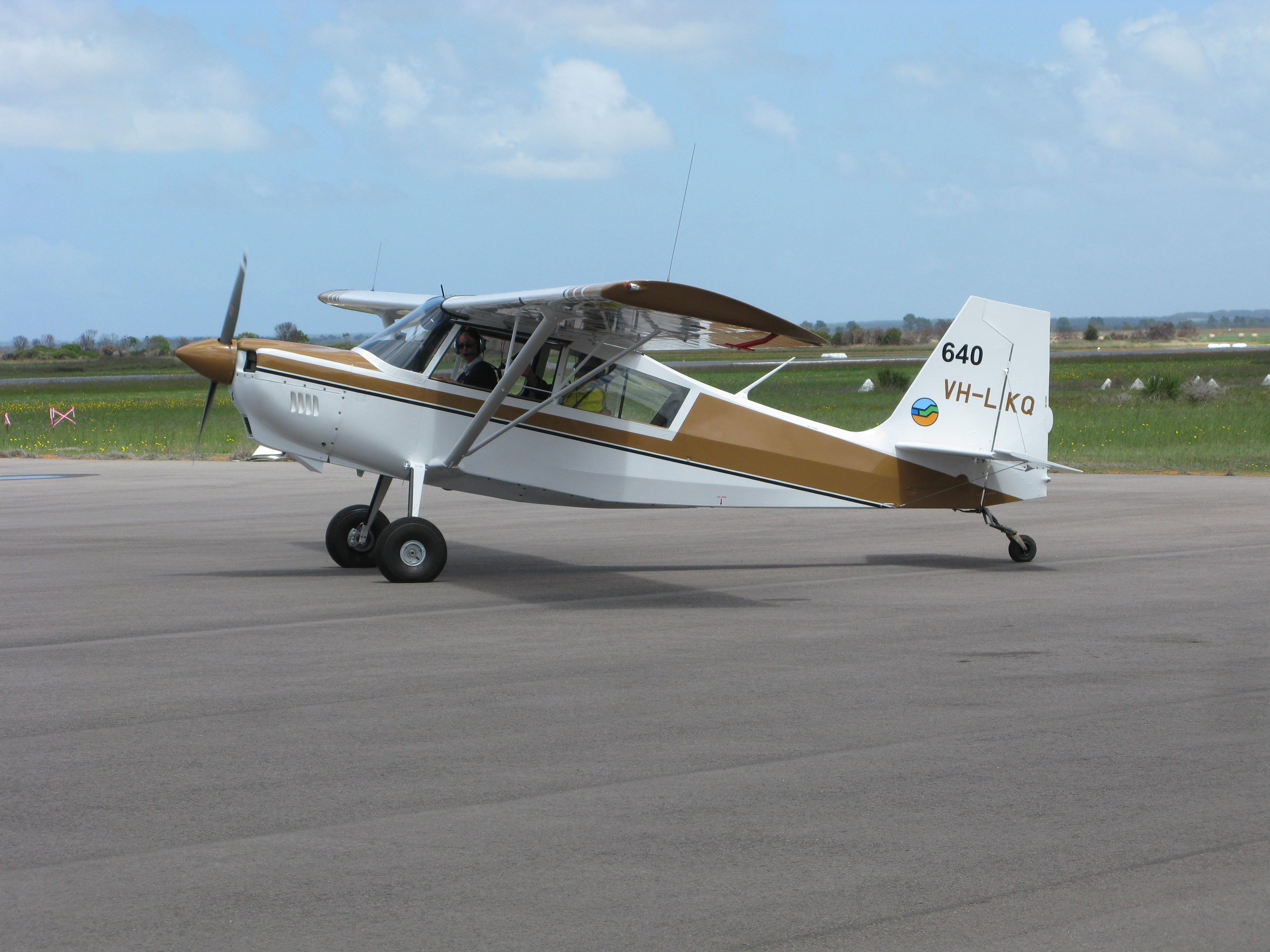
American Champion Scout at Esperance Airport in November 2011. This aircraft was used for bushfire spotting or incident mapping.

== See also ==
- Australasian Fire and Emergency Service Authorities Council
