= Water Authority of Western Australia =

Agency overview
- Formed: 1 January 1985
- Preceding agency: Metropolitan Water Authority; Public Works Department
- Dissolved: 31 December 1995
- Superseding agency: Water Corporation
- Jurisdiction: Government of Western Australia

The Water Authority of Western Australia, also known as WAWA, was a statutory authority of the state government that was responsible for the water supply, sewerage, and main drainage within Western Australia between 1985 and 1995.

== History ==
The Water Authority of Western Australia was founded in 1985 under the Water Authority Act 1984. (Note: Now the Water Agencies (Powers) Act 1984) Its purpose was to manage the water supply, sewerage, and main drainage across the entire state of Western Australia. Previously, these had been managed by two separate entities: the Metropolitan Water Authority covered the metropolitan region, and the Public Works Department covered regional Western Australia.

It was superseded by the Water Corporation on 1 January 1996.

== Education ==
In 1995, the Water Authority created the Waterwise Schools Program, to educate school students – and their parents and teachers – about the value of water resources, and the importance of protecting them. The first "Waterwise School" was Hillarys Primary School. The program has since expanded to include almost half of the schools in WA.
