= Road verge =

Vegetative strip beside a roadway

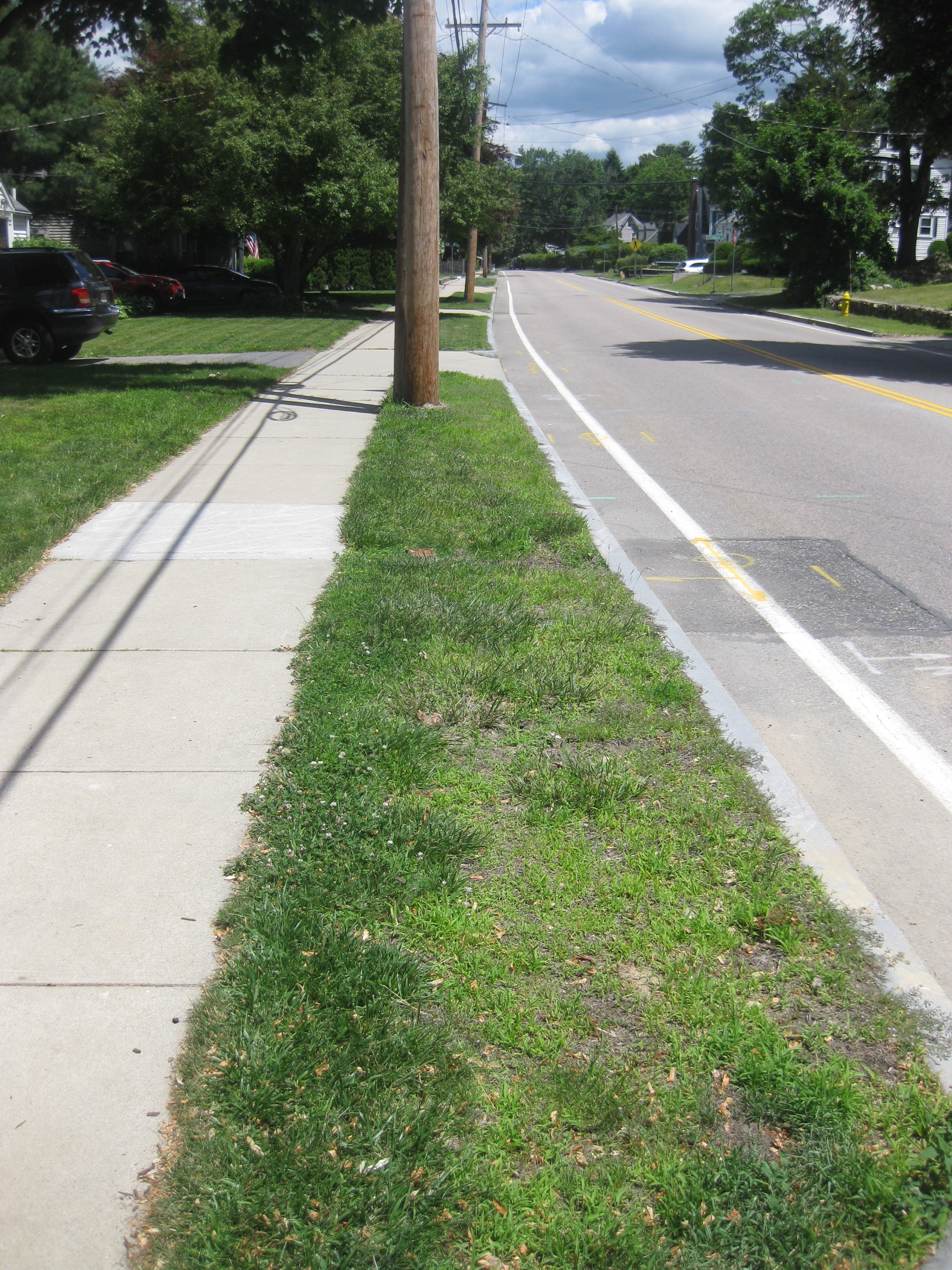
A curb strip in suburban Greater Boston, Massachusetts. Outside of rural areas in New England, curb strips are narrow – the one pictured is 52 inches (130 cm; 1.3 m) from curb to sidewalk. They are usually not maintained by the municipality, but rather by the property owner, and are used primarily to provide space for utility poles.

A road verge is a strip of groundcover consisting of grass or garden plants, and sometimes also shrubs and trees, located between a roadway and a sidewalk. Verges are also known by other names such as easement, parkway, grass strip, nature strip, curb strip, berm, park strip, or tree lawn, the usage of which is often quite regional.

Road verges are often public property. Sometimes they are maintained by municipalities while other local authorities require abutting property owners to perform maintenance (e.g., watering, mowing, edging, trimming/pruning and weeding). Additional maintenance includes clearing the adjunct footpaths and gutters, forms of community work.

Benefits of having road verges include visual aesthetics, increased safety and comfort of sidewalk users, protection from spray from passing vehicles, and a space for benches, bus shelters, street lights, and other public amenities. Verges are also often part of sustainability for water conservation or the management of urban runoff and water pollution and can provide useful wildlife habitat. Snow that has been plowed off the street in colder climates is often stored in the area of the verge by default.

In the British Isles, road verges serve as important habitats for a range of plants, including rare wildflowers. In the UK, around 700 different species of wildflower can be found growing on verges, including 29 of the country's 52 species of orchid. Verges can also support a wide range of animals and plants that may have been displaced from their usual grassland habitats, as the soil is not extensively fertilized and relatively undisturbed by human activity. Animals that reside on verges range from small insects and amphibians, to larger reptiles, mammals and birds, which rely on verges as a corridor connecting areas of undamaged habitat. As a result, verges may be managed by local areas to encourage biodiversity and conserve the ecosystems that rely on them.

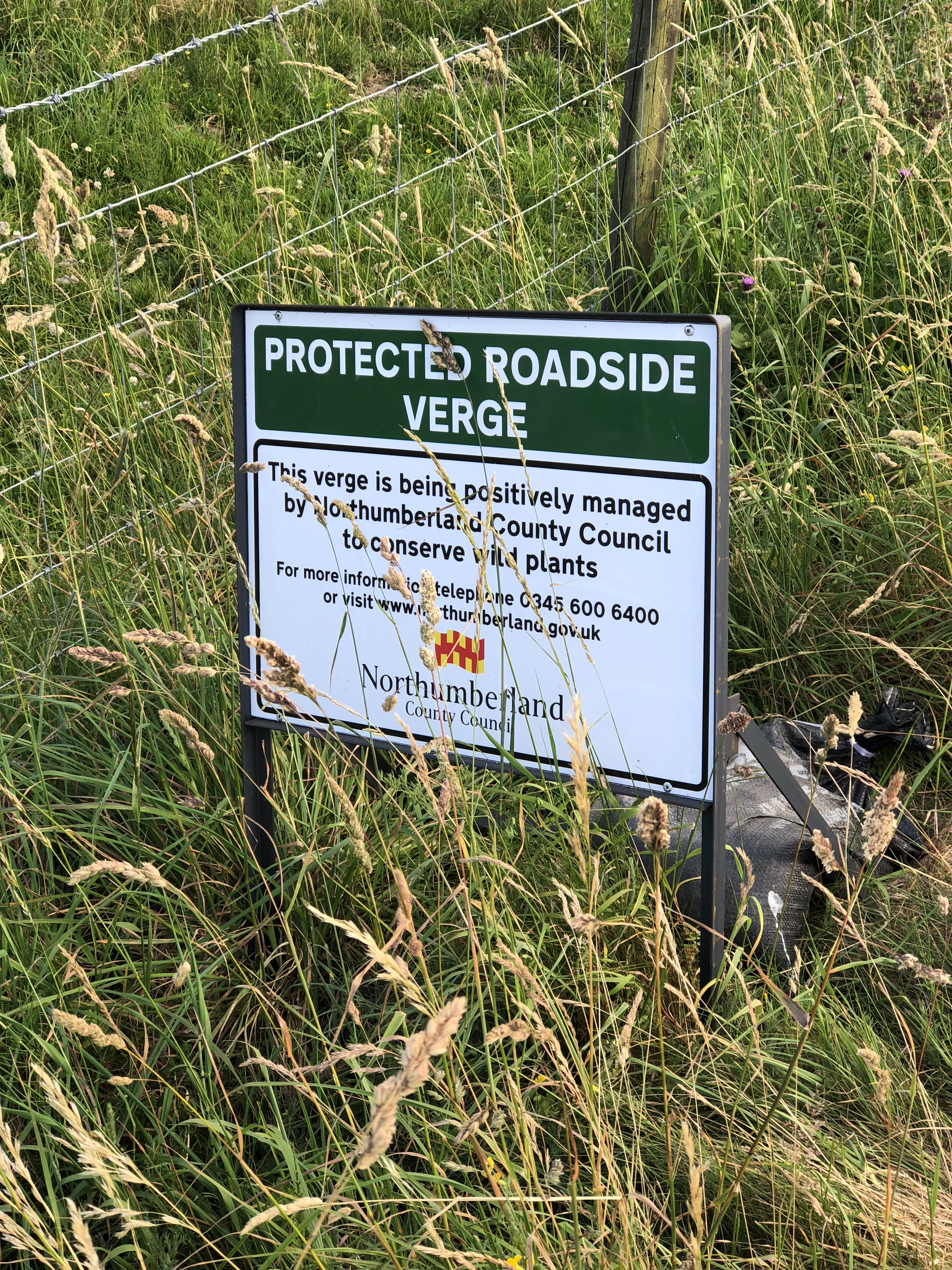
A sign on a road verge in Northumberland, England, indicating that the verge is being managed by the local council to maintain populations of wild plants

The main disadvantage of a road verge is that the right-of-way must be wider, increasing the cost of the road. In some localities, a wider verge offers opportunity for later road widening, should the traffic usage of a road demand this. For this reason, footpaths are usually sited a significant distance from the curb.

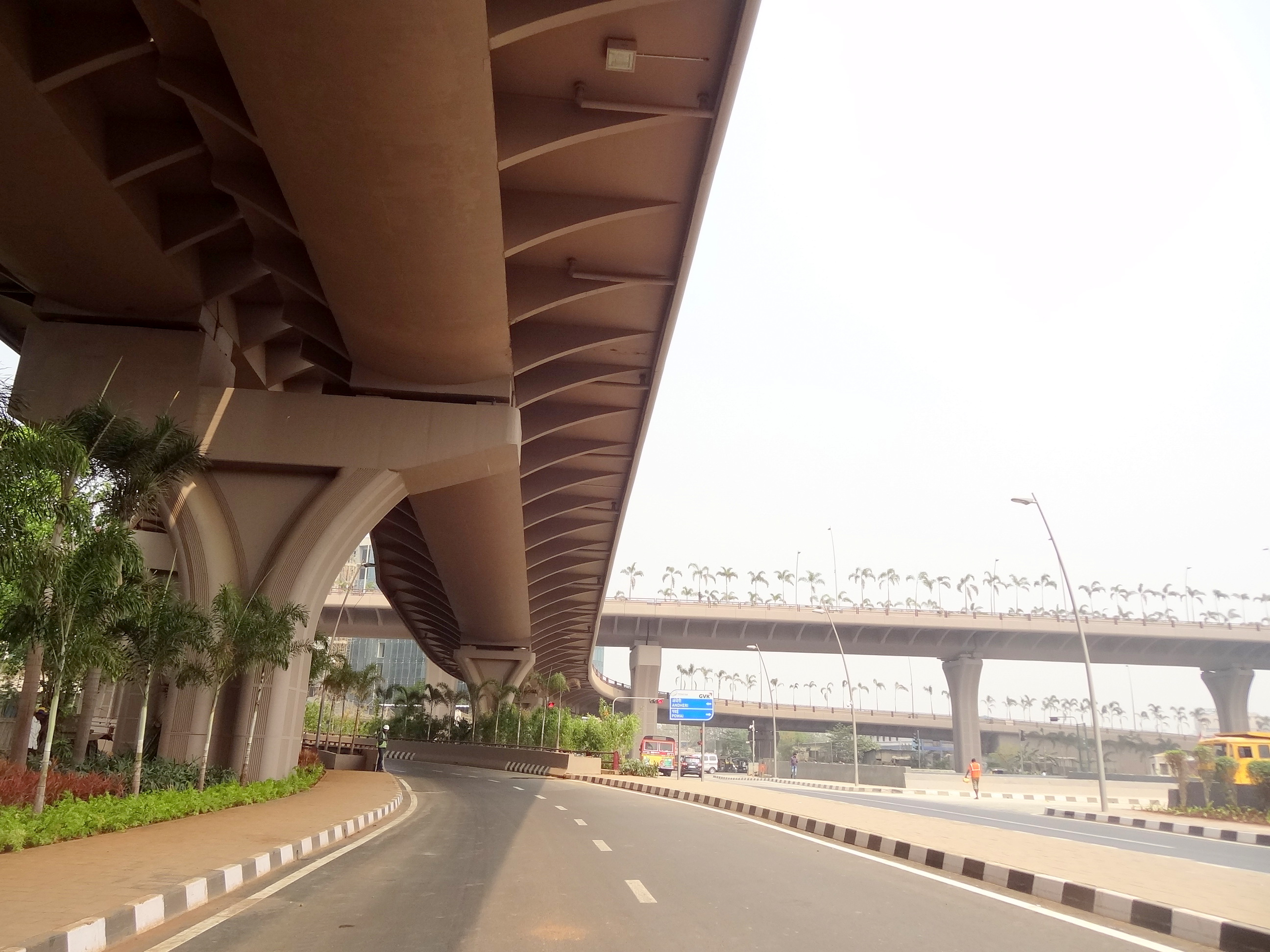
Pavements and planted strips in India ( Mumbai/Bombay)

Certain nutrient amounts in a verge's soil can be influenced by the amount of traffic on the road it sits beside; roads with heavier traffic tend to have more nitrate in the soil due to nitrogen compounds from air pollution leaching out of the atmosphere and into the ground.

== Sustainable urban and landscape design ==
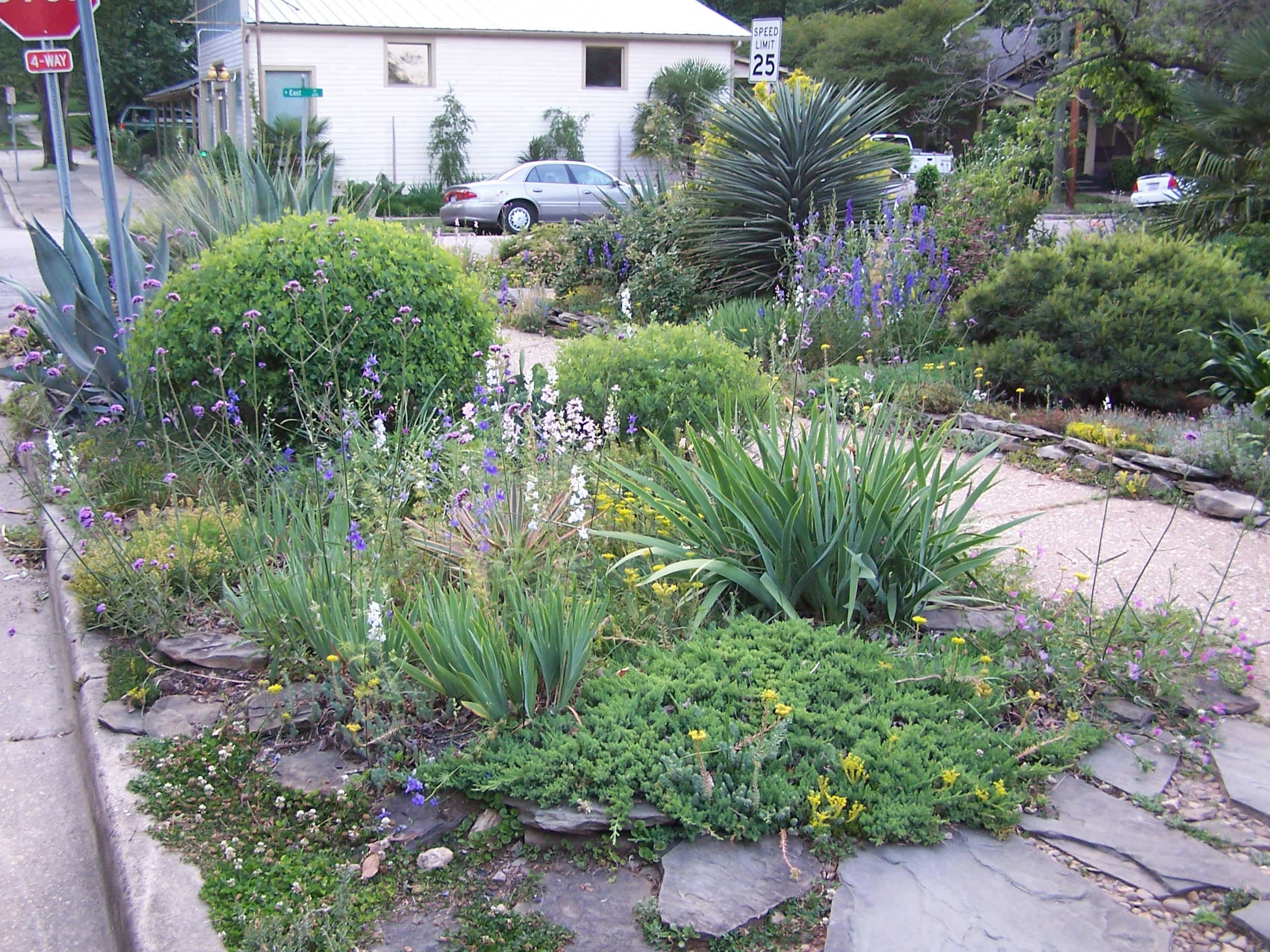
Planted rain garden in the "tree lawn" zone, Raleigh, North Carolina.

In urban and suburban areas, urban runoff from private and civic properties can be guided by grading and bioswales for rainwater harvesting collection and bioretention within the "tree-lawn" (road verge) – parkway zone in rain gardens. This is done for reducing runoff of rain and domestic water: for their carrying waterborne pollution off-site into storm drains and sewer systems; and for the groundwater recharge of aquifers.

In some cities, such as Santa Monica, California, city code mandates specify:

Parkways, the area between the outside edge of the sidewalk and the inside edge of the curb which are a component of the Public Right of Way (PROW) – that the landscaping should require little or no irrigation and the area produce no runoff.

For Santa Monica, another reason for this use of "tree-lawns" is to reduce current beach and Santa Monica Bay ocean pollution that is measurably higher at city outfalls. New construction and remodeling projects needing building permits require that landscape design submittals include garden design plans showing the means of compliance.

In some cities and counties, such as Portland, Oregon, street and highway departments are regrading and planting rain gardens in road verges to reduce boulevard and highway runoff. This practice can be useful in areas with either independent Storm sewers or combined storm and sanitary sewers, reducing the frequency of pollution, treatment costs, and released overflows of untreated sewage into rivers and oceans during rainstorms.

== Rural roadsides ==
In some countries, the road verge can be a corridor of vegetation that remains after adjacent land has been cleared. Considerable effort in supporting conservation of the remnant vegetation is prevalent in Australia, where significant tracts of land are managed as part of the roadside conservation strategies by government agencies.

== Gallery ==
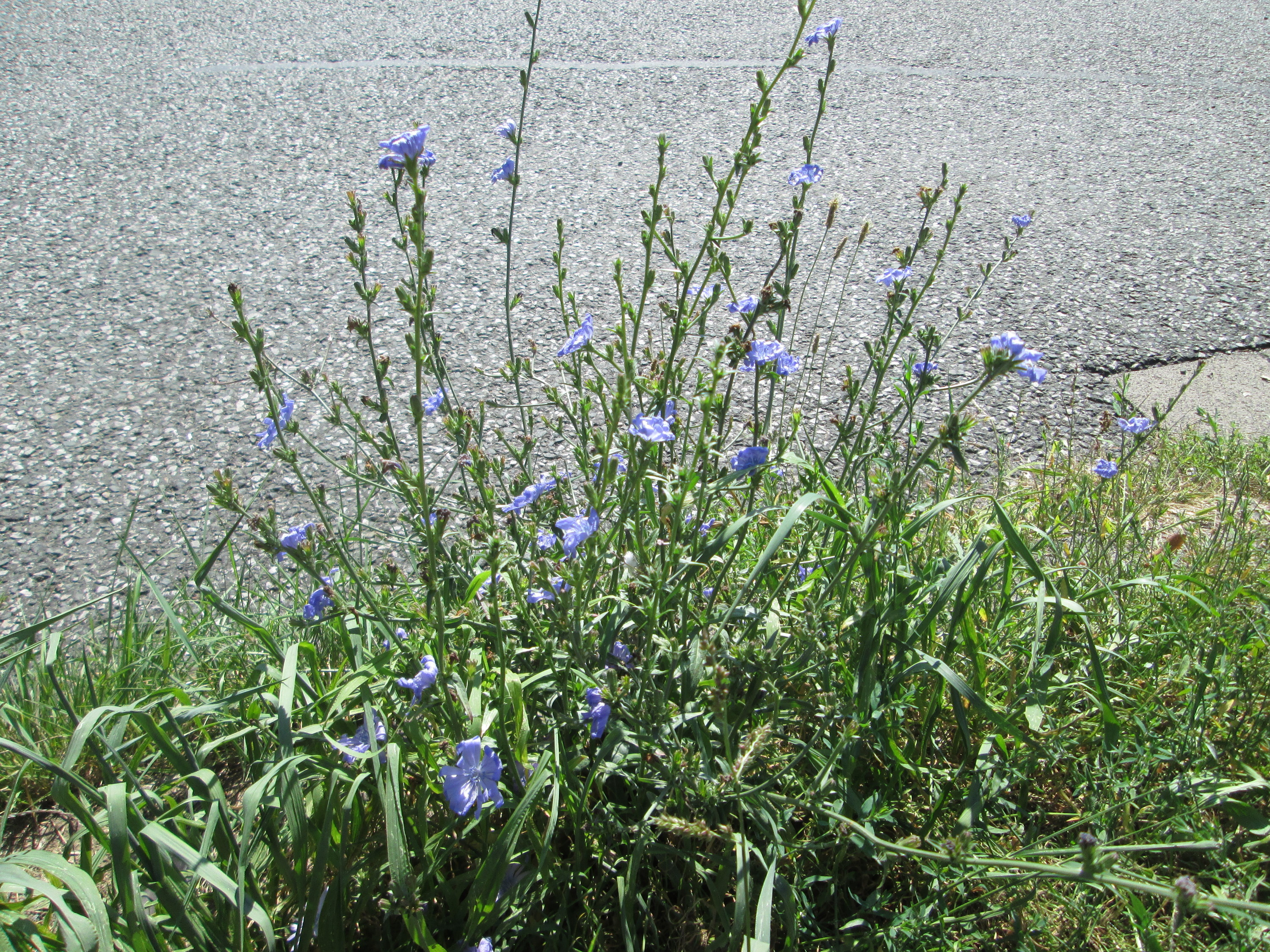
Chicory (Cichorium intybus) blooming on a road verge in Bischmisheim, Saarbrücken, Germany

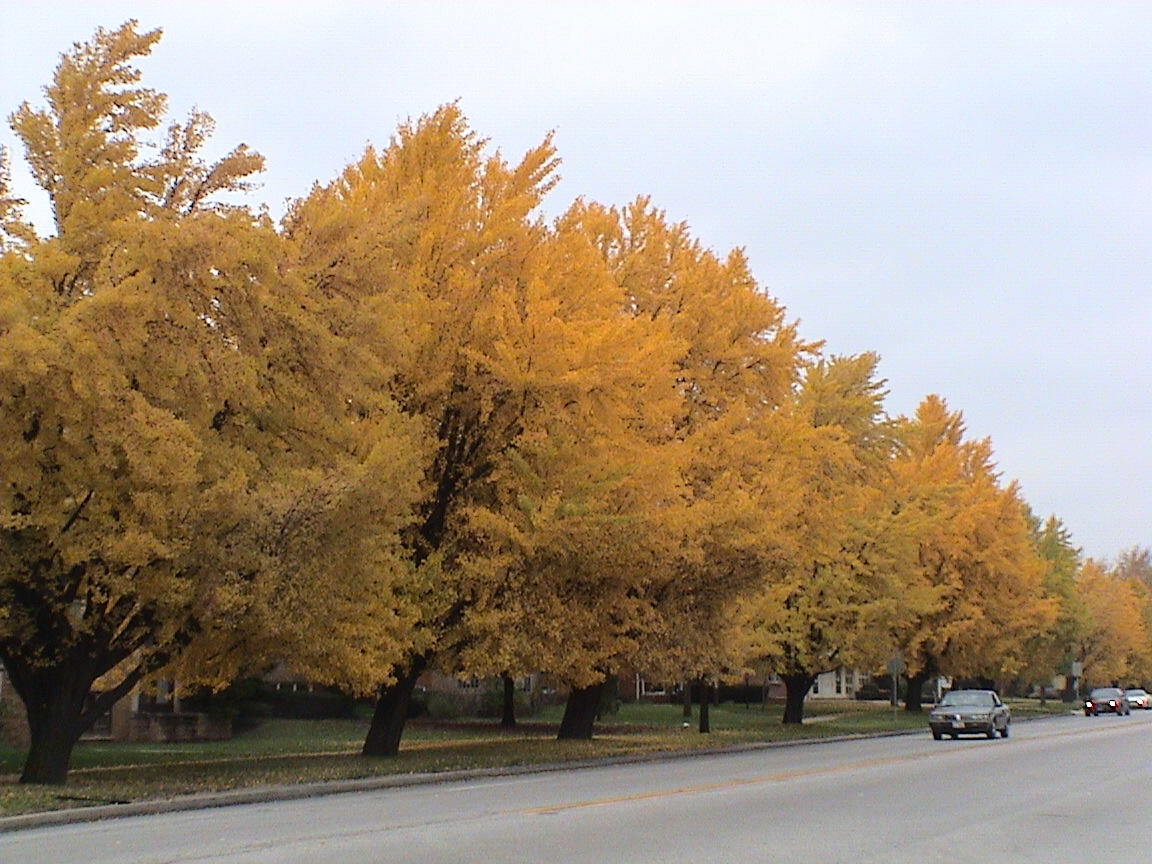
Ginkgo street trees in the "boulevard" area, in Riverside, Illinois

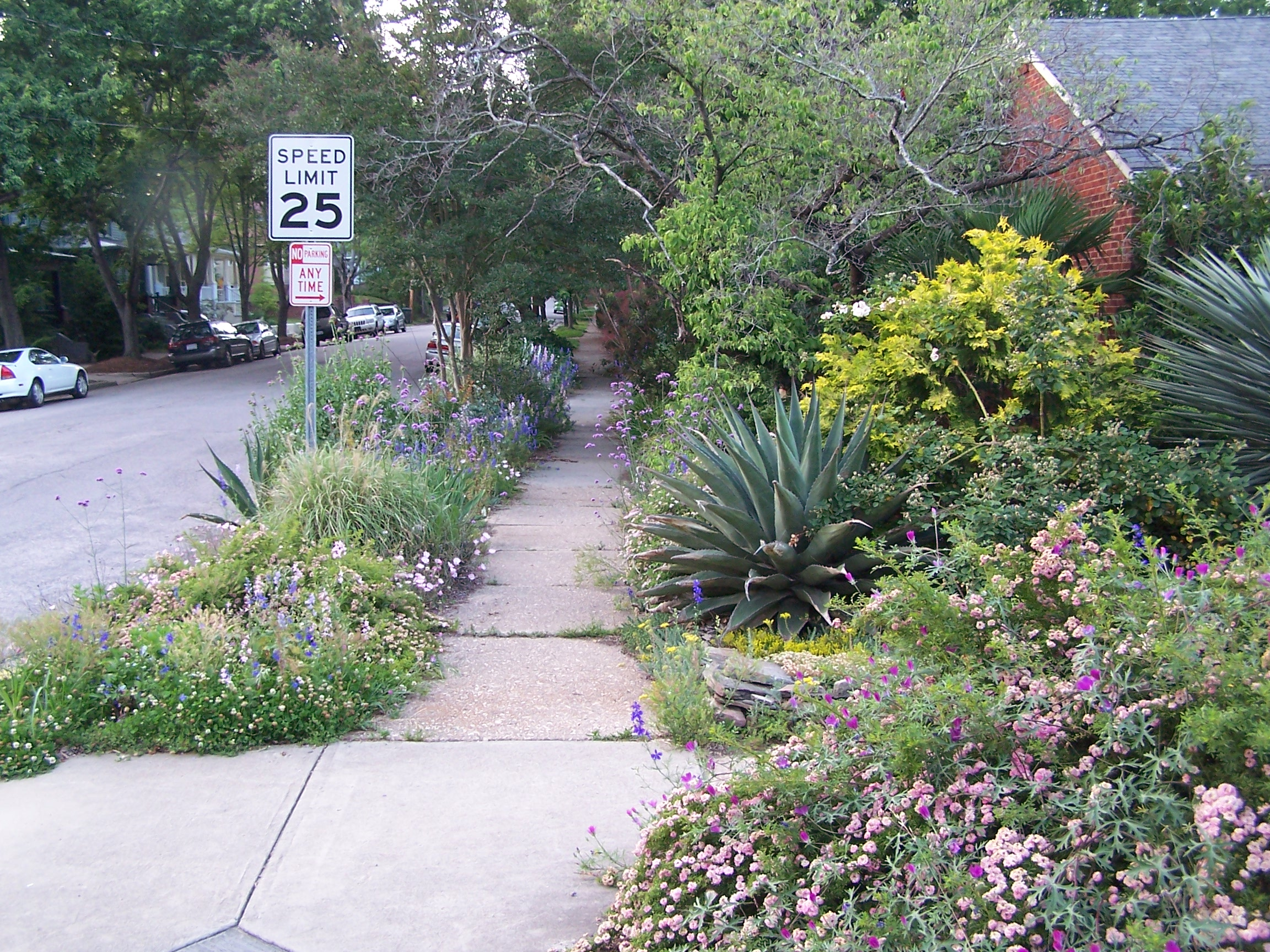
A planted garden in the "tree lawn", in Raleigh, North Carolina

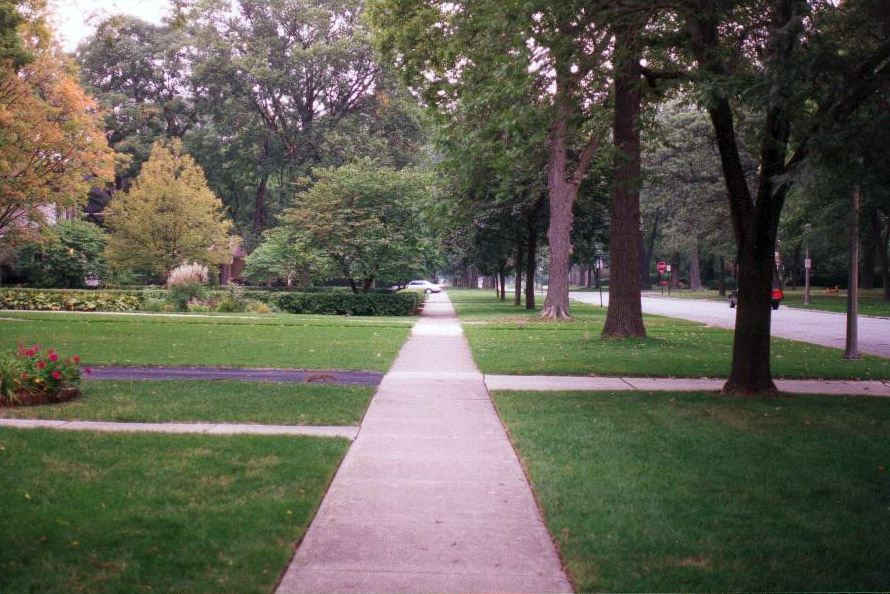
A "parkway" with street trees in Oak Park, Illinois

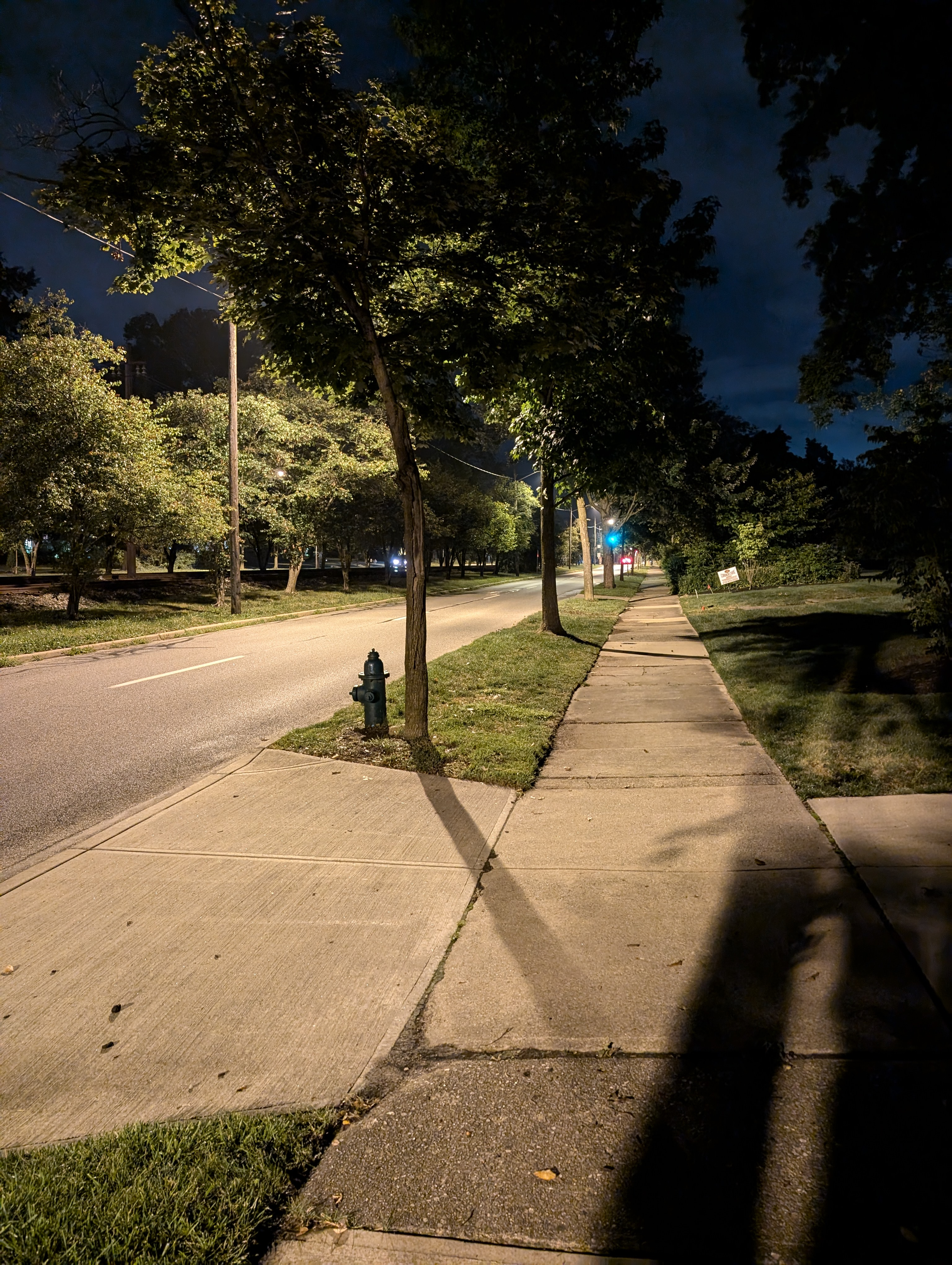
A tree lawn with street trees in Shaker Heights, Ohio

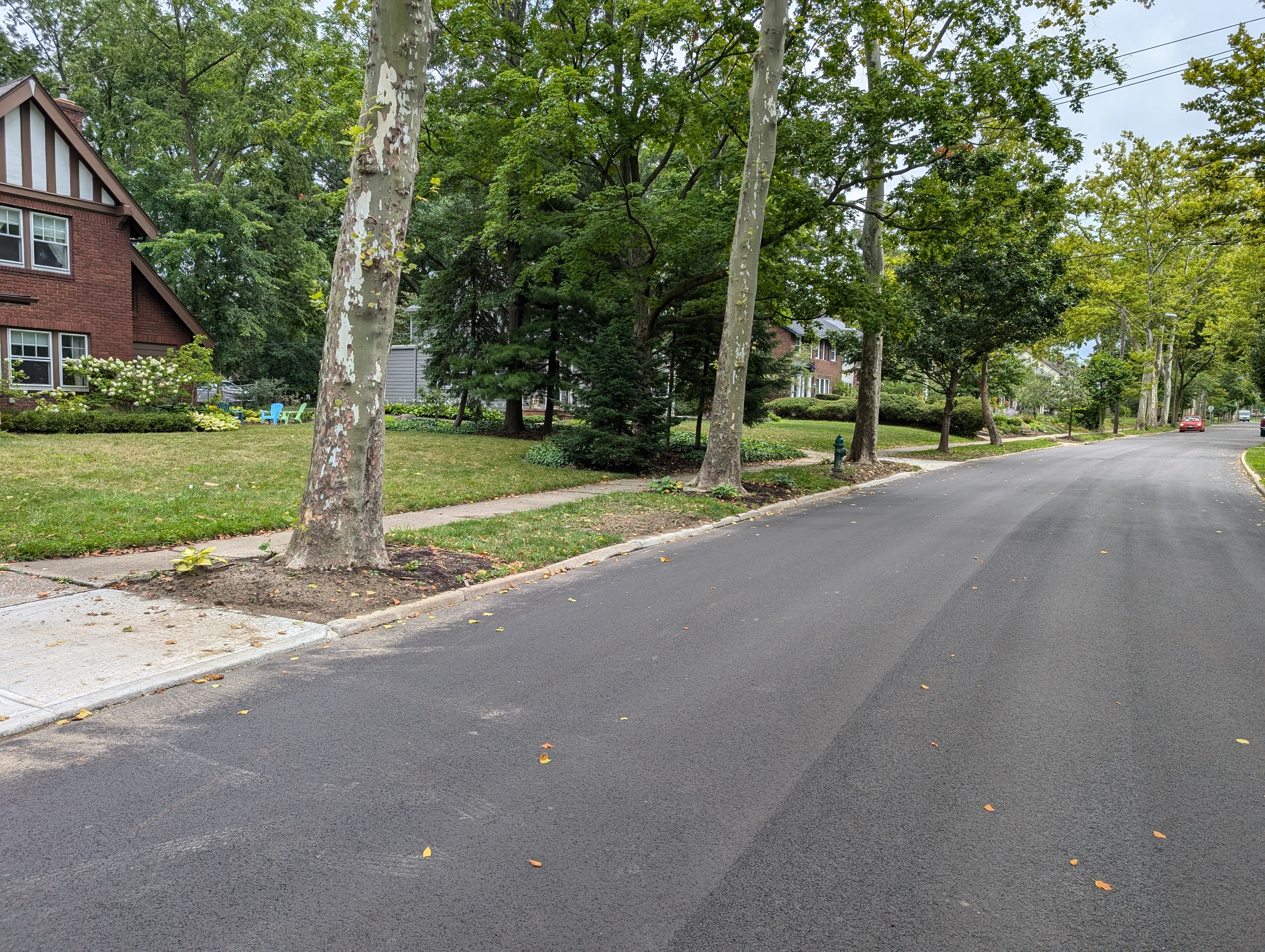
A tree lawn with street trees in Shaker Heights, Ohio

== Terminology ==
The term verge has many synonyms and dialectal differences. Some dialects and idiolects lack a specific term for this area, instead using a circumlocution.

Terms used include:

- Amenity Zone: Las Vegas
- Berm: Pennsylvania, northern Indiana, Ohio, Michigan, Wisconsin, New Zealand
- Besidewalk
- Boulevard: Detroit, Michigan; North Dakota; Minnesota; Iowa; Illinois; Ohio; Wisconsin; United States Upper Midwest; Winnipeg, and western Canada; Toronto, Ontario; Markham, Ontario; Kitchener, Ontario
- Boulevard strip: U.S. Upper Midwest
- Common: New England, generally describes a large strip of grass. Also refers to park-like common-use green spaces in small town centers.
- Curb lawn: Kalamazoo, Michigan; Elyria, Ohio; Miami County, Ohio; Greenville, South Carolina
- Curb strip: New Jersey, New York, North Carolina, Florida, Ohio, Indiana, Massachusetts, Michigan, Iowa, Kansas, Nebraska, Oregon, Washington
- Devil strip or devilstrip: Akron, Ohio; Northeast Ohio. This term was once used more widely to refer to the space between tracks on a streetcar line, a space not wide enough to stand in as cars passed.
- Drivestrip or Drive Strip
- Easement: Southeast Michigan
- Extension lawn: Ann Arbor, Michigan
- Furniture zone, also landscape zone: a term used by urban planners, indicating its suitability for "street furniture" such as utility poles and fire hydrants, as well as trees or planters
- Grassplot: East Coast of the United States, Pennsylvania
- Governor’s Strip: Delaware
- Hellstrip
- Hellscape: Tulsa
- Island strip: Long Island, New York
- Long acre – a traditional term for wide grassy road verges, used by grazing herds or flocks moving from place to place
- Median: Washington, Oregon*
- Mow strip: SF East Bay Area Northern California
- Nature strip: Australia
- Neutral ground: U.S. Gulf states
- Outlawn: Midland, Michigan
- Park strip: Ohio, Utah
- Parking: Illinois, Iowa, Western United States
- Parking strip: Washington, Oregon, Utah, much of California
- Parkrow: Iowa, Oregon
- Parkway: Grand Rapids, Michigan; Greater Los Angeles; San Francisco Bay Area; West Coast of the United States; Casper, Wyoming; Ohio; Illinois; Missouri; Florida; Texas
- Parkway strip: Austin, Texas; Fort Collins, Colorado
- Planter zone: SmartCode/New Urbanist terminology
- Planting strip: Berkeley, California, Seattle, Washington
- Right-of-way: Wisconsin, Illinois
- Road allowance: Ottawa, Canada
- Road verge: Australia
- Roadside: Australia
- Shoulder
- Sidewalk lawn: Georgia
- Sidewalk plot: Virginia, Maryland, Indiana, Tennessee
- Sidewalk strip: California, North Carolina, Oregon, Utah, Washington
- Street lawn: Ohio
- Subway: Western New York
- Swale: South Florida
- Terrace: U.S. Great Lakes region, Missouri
- Tree bank: The Fox River Valley including Elgin, Illinois.
- Tree belt: Massachusetts
- Tree box: Washington, DC
- Tree lawn or treelawn: Ohio, Indiana, New York, and elsewhere
- Verge: UK, New Zealand, South Africa, Western Australia

== See also ==
- Category:Environmental conservation
- Central reservation
- Median strip
- Road ecology
- Roadside conservation
- Shoulder (road)
- Urban forestry
