= Department of Water and Environmental Regulation =

Western Australian government department

Agency overview
- Formed: 1 July 2017
- Preceding agencies: Department of Environment Regulation Department of Water Office of the Environmental Protection Authority; Department of Environment and Conservation
- Jurisdiction: Government of Western Australia
- Agency executive: Michelle Andrews, Director General
- Child agency: Keep Australia Beautiful Council WA Waste Authority of Western Australia Office of the Appeals Convenor Cockburn Sound Management Council Contaminated Sites Committee
- Website: www.der.wa.gov.au

The Department of Water and Environmental Regulation was formed on 1 July 2017, when the Department of Environment Regulation (DER) amalgamated with the Department of Water and the Office of the Environmental Protection Authority. It is responsible for looking after the environment and the regulation of water resources in the state of Western Australia.

The department provides services to the Environmental Protection Authority, and support to Keep Australia Beautiful Council WA, the Waste Authority of Western Australia, the Office of the Appeals Convenor, the Cockburn Sound Management Council and the Contaminated Sites Committee.

In May 2021, the department was one of eight Western Australian Government departments to receive a new Director General with Michelle Andrews being appointed to the role effective from 31 May 2021.
