= Roadside conservation =

Method of conservation

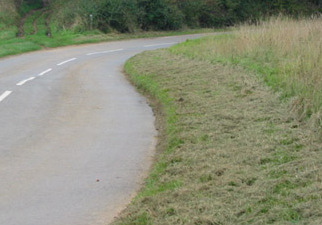
Roadside conservation area, near Croxton Kerrial and Denton

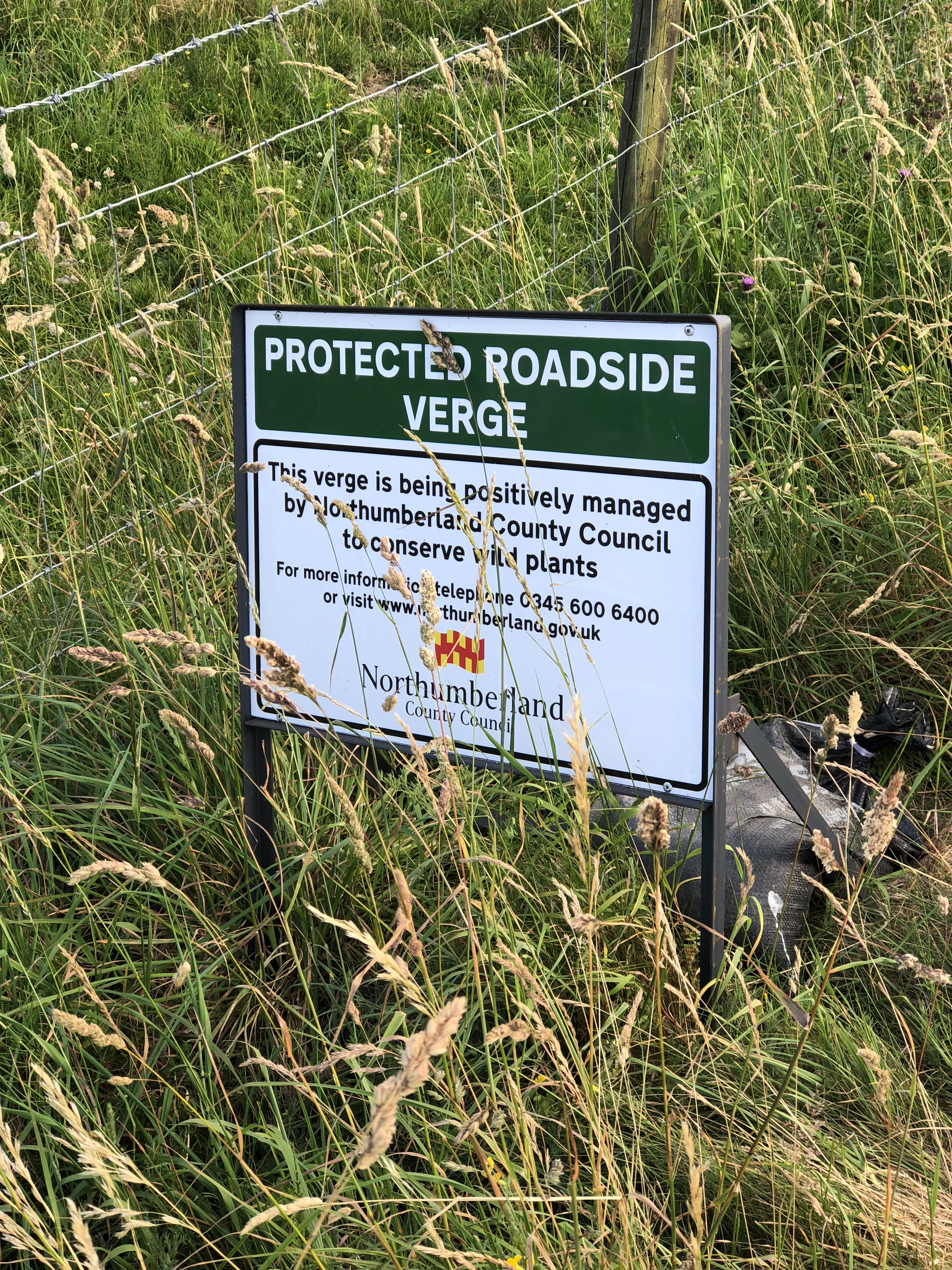
A sign on a road verge in Northumberland, England, indicating that the verge is being managed by the local council to maintain populations of wild plants

Roadside conservation is a conservation strategy in Australia and other countries where road verge flora and habitats are protected or improved. The general aim is to conserve or increase the amount of native flora species; especially where that work will lead to higher conservation value, for example providing food or habitat for rare or endangered native fauna.

== Issues ==
Potential benefits of roadside conservation strategies can include:

- Maintenance of the biodiversity of the roadsides
- Sustaining available corridors for fauna movement and habitat
- Preserving remnants of native vegetation adjoining man-made environments

Problems with the maintaining of roadsides include:

- Removal, cutting of native vegetation
- Conflicts with road safety, such as foliage growth which restricts visibility for road users
- Work-load due to the extent of roadsides (i.e. the great length)

== Western Australia ==
Formal recognition of the importance of roadside reserves occurred in the 1960s when then-Premier of Western Australia, the Hon. David Brand, ensured all new roads in Western Australia would have road reserves at least 40 metres wider than that needed for transport purposes.
