= Department of Water (Western Australia) =

Former government department in Western Australia

Agency overview
- Formed: 1 January 2006
- Preceding agency: Water & Rivers Commission
- Dissolved: 30 June 2017
- Superseding agency: Department of Water & Environmental Regulation
- Jurisdiction: Government of Western Australia
- Headquarters: 168 St Georges Terrace, Perth, Western Australia
- Agency executive: Mike Rowe, Director General
- Website: www.water.wa.gov.au/

The Department of Water was a department of the Government of Western Australia that was responsible for management of Western Australia's water resources.

== History ==
The Department of Water was established on 1 January 2006 succeeding the Water & Rivers Commission.

It was succeeded by the Department of Water & Environmental Regulation on 1 July 2017.

The department provides information to industry, technical support and professional guidance to government on the status of water and the viability of new water source developments. It also issues licences for artesian groundwater wells throughout the state.
