= Water Agencies (Powers) Act 1984 =

Parliament of Western Australia
- Long title: An Act to vest powers in the Water Corporation, the Water and Rivers Commission and the Coordinator of Water Services, to make other provision in respect of their functions, and for related and other purposes.
- Citation: No. 3 of 1984
- Royal assent: 18 May 1984

The Water Agencies (Powers) Act 1984, previously known as the Water Authority Act 1984, is an act of the Western Australian Parliament that provided for the development, protection and monitoring of water resources, mainly through the establishment of the Water Authority of Western Australia.
