= Water Corporation =

Supplier of water, wastewater and drainage services in Western Australia

Agency overview
- Formed: 1 January 1996
- Preceding agency: Water Authority of Western Australia
- Jurisdiction: Government of Western Australia
- Agency executive: Pat Donovan, chief executive officer
- Website: www.watercorporation.com.au

Water Corporation is the principal supplier of water, wastewater and drainage services throughout the state of Western Australia. It is the seventh successive agency to deal with the services in Perth, Western Australia.

With offices in Perth, Bunbury, Albany, Karratha, Geraldton, Northam and Kalgoorlie, Water Corporation's services, projects and activities span 2.6 million square kilometres (1.0 million square miles). The organisation employs over 4000 people and manages an asset base over A$37 billion in water supply, wastewater, drainage infrastructure and bulk water for irrigation.

Water Corporation is owned by the Western Australian Government and is accountable to its sole shareholder, the Minister for Water. Most of Water Corporation's surplus is returned to the Government as a dividend to contribute to the development of the state, with the remainder invested in capital works.

== Formation ==
Water Corporation was created in January 1996, in a restructure of the water industry in Western Australia. The Water Authority in turn had been created in 1985 through a merger of the former Metropolitan Water Authority, which operated in Perth, the state capital, and the water and wastewater operations of the former Public Works Department of Western Australia.

=== Agency name history ===
- 1 October 1896 – 1 April 1909: Metropolitan Water Works Board
- 1 April 1909 – 1 January 1910: Metropolitan Board of Water Supply and Sewerage
- 1 January 1910 – 1 July 1964: Metropolitan Water Supply, Sewerage and Drainage Department
- 1 January 1912 – 1 January 1921: Water Supply, Sewerage and Drainage Department
- 1 July 1964 – 1 July 1982: Metropolitan Water Supply Sewerage and Drainage Board
- 1 July 1982 – 1 July 1985: Metropolitan Water Authority
- 1 July 1985 – 1 January 1996: Water Authority of Western Australia
- 1 January 1996: Water Corporation

== Operations ==
=== Irrigation ===
Water Corporation provides more than 5,234 megalitres (1.383 billion US gallons) per year of bulk water supplies to irrigation schemes operated by farmer cooperatives in the northwest (Ord Irrigation District), midwest (Gascoyne Irrigation District) and southwest (South West and Preston Valley Irrigation Districts).

=== Drainage ===
Water Corporation manages main drainage systems in Perth and some regional areas to prevent flooding and optimise land usage while minimising impacts on property and protecting the natural environment. These services involve about 1,420 kilometres (880 mi) of rural main drains and more than 1,126 kilometres (700 mi) of drains in the Perth metropolitan area. Local councils manage most of Perth's smaller reticulation drains. Corporation drainage services benefit 320,000 hectares (790,000 acres) of agricultural land in parts of the South West and Albany on the south coast.

== Planning for the future ==
To ensure water services for a state that is growing rapidly yet at the same time suffering reduced rainfall, Water Corporation plans well ahead on multiple fronts. It aims to reduce water use and increase wastewater recycling while developing new water sources with a strong focus on those that are independent of climate. At the same time, it aims to reduce environmental impact from its operations.

In October 2009, 16 years ago, Water Corporation released a 50-year plan that provides a portfolio of options to manage demand and supply balance by 2060.

The Water Corporations most recent strategy is called Thrive2035 and provides direction to manage water services sustainably through to 2035.
