= Drummond Nature Reserve =

Nature reserve in Western Australia

- IUCN category Ia (strict nature reserve)
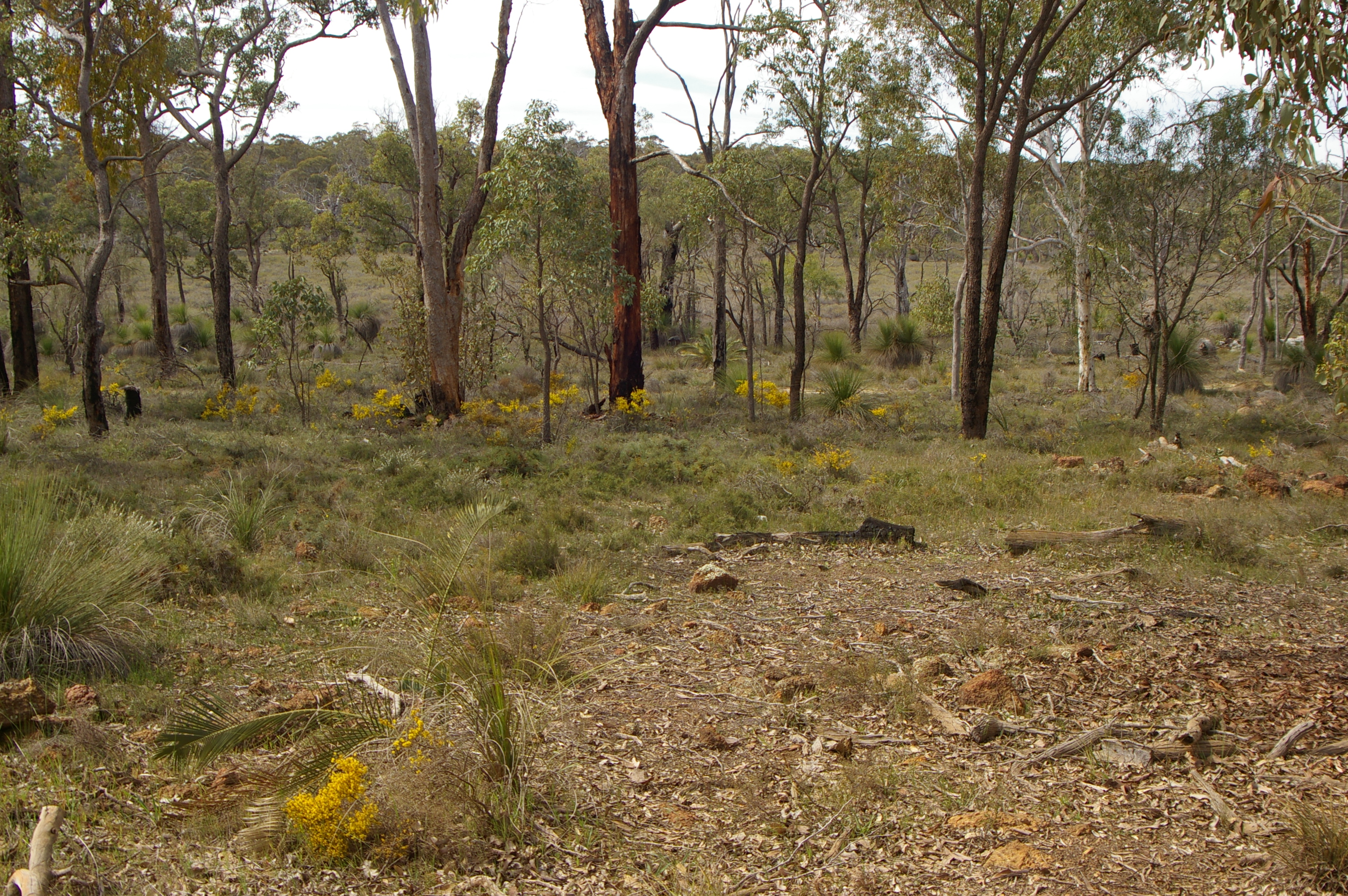
- View from the south western boundary into the reserve. The yellow flowers are species of Acacia.

- Location within Western Australia
- Location: Western Australia
- Nearest city: Bolgart
- Coordinates: 31.317°S 116.407°E
- Area: 439 ha (1,080 acres)
- Established: 1993
- Governing body: Department of Biodiversity, Conservation and Attractions

The Drummond Nature Reserve is an A class nature reserve 10 kilometres (6.2 mi) west of Bolgart, Western Australia. Named after the botanist James Drummond, the reserve has 439 species of vascular plants within its boundaries, including two rare and seven priority species.

== History ==
In 1993 the land was purchased by the Mundaring district office of the Department of Conservation and Land Management and gazetted as an A class reserve. Prior to purchasing the land was uncleared freehold grazing land. Despite this use the land was in excellent condition, though evidence of grazing impact was visible in part of the eastern area of the reserve. The reserve was named after botanist James Drummond who lived in nearby Toodyay. Between 1841 and 1844 Drummond explored and collected specimens in the area which were part of his second collection.

== Topography and vegetation ==
The Drummond Nature Reserve is constructed with a series of lateritic hills with spillway deposits plus a small outcrop of bedrock. There have been ten different vegetation areas identified, and these are based on different soil types, topography and drainage. The area has six different woodland types, two granite heath types, a mallee vegetation type and two of the last claypan wetland areas remaining in the state.

The vegetation of the two granite heath types are; Xanthorrhoea preissii, Gastrolobium calycinum with a Borya herbfield, while the other is dominated by Melaleuca and Dodonaea with a herbfield of Borya. The soil of the mallee area is a yellow sandy clay with the dominant plants being the low dense Eucalyptus drummondii and Allocasuarina.

The north west corner is a wandoo woodland that has been affected by salinity. Most of the trees are either dead or affected by dieback, the understorey has died and been replaced by weeds.

== Flora ==
During 1999 and 2000, the first major survey of the plant species was conducted on foot, identifying 439 species of vascular plants. This consisted of 405 native plant species and 35 alien plant species. There were two declared rare flora; the aquatic herb Trithuria leptogyne (this is the only known location of this species) and Eleocharis keigheryi in two population groups. Additionally there are seven priority species in the reserve.

Species	Priority
Acacia chapmanii subsp. australis	rare
Comesperma rhadinocarpum	two
Tricoryne arenicola	two
Platysace ramosissima	three
Stenanthemum tridentatum	three
Hydrocotyle lemnoides	four
Schoenus natans	four

There are several other factors of botanical interest in Drummond Nature Reserve. The occurrence of Cyathochaeta equitans is the only known inland population, as this species is found predominantly in the sands of the Swan Coastal Plain. A hybrid of Eucalyptus loxophleba has been found within the reserve, Schoenus aff. loliaceus which may be a new species of Schoenus and Rhodanthe pyrethrum is at it northern limit.

== Gallery ==
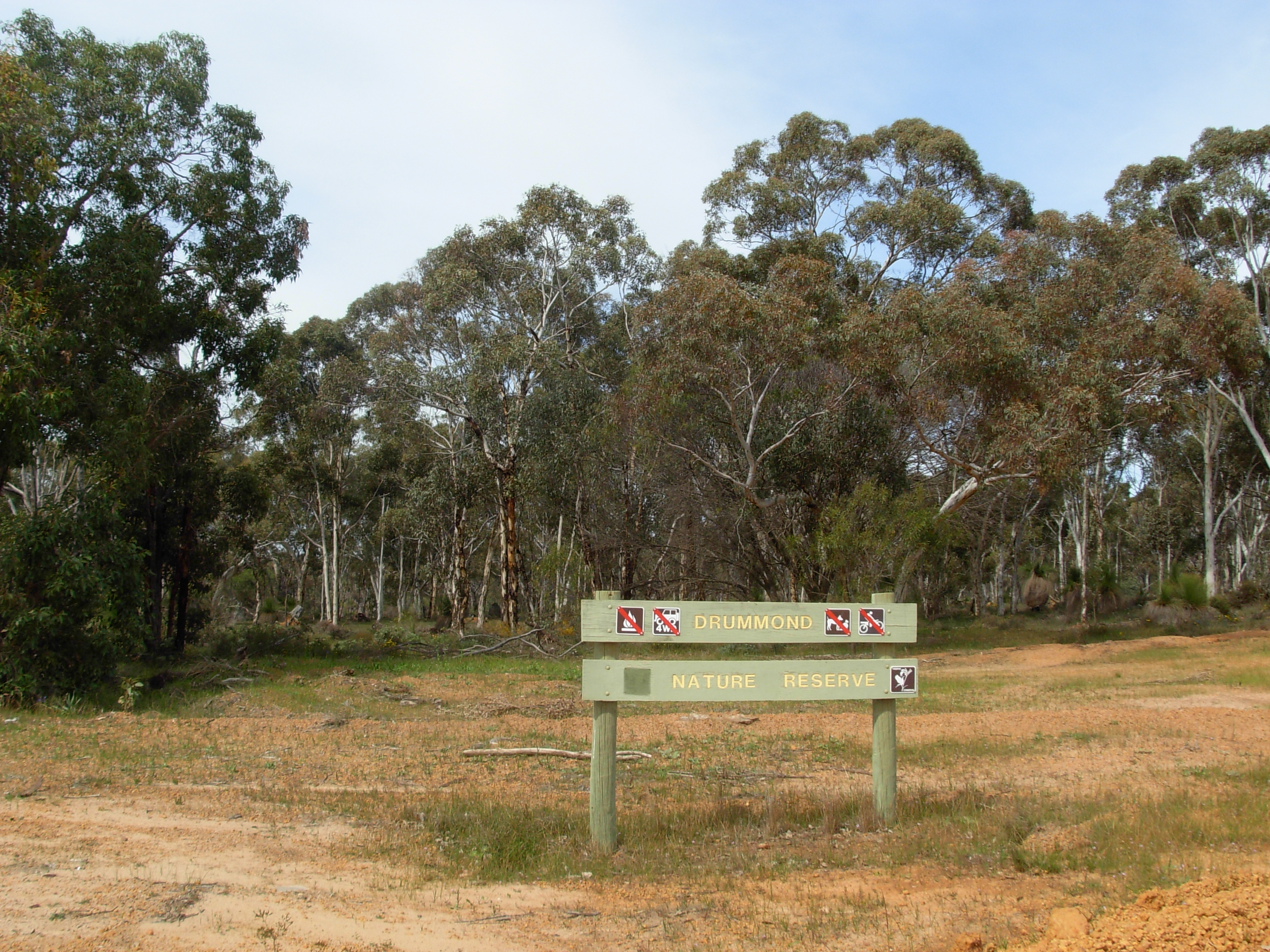
Northern project sign

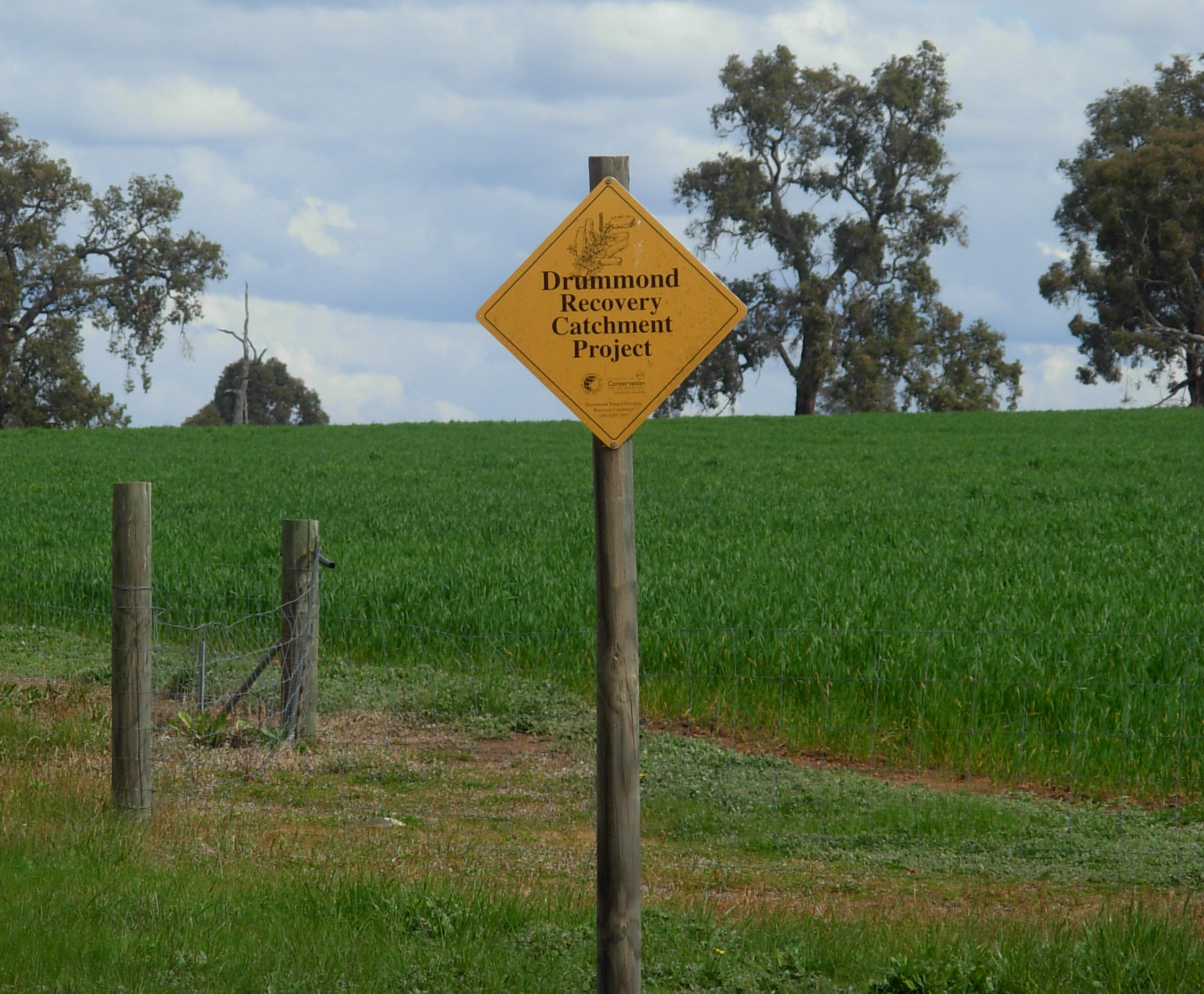
Catchment project sign

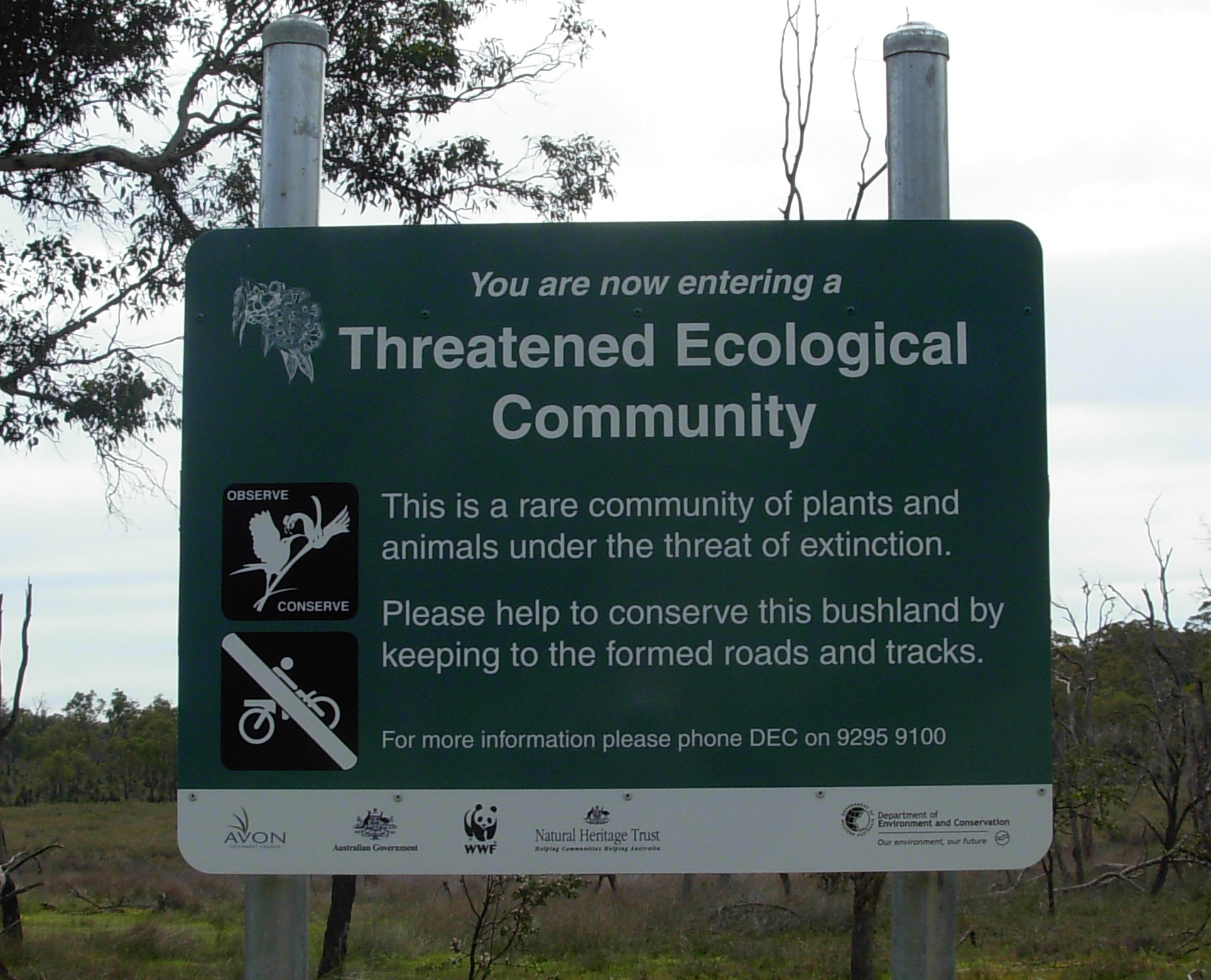
Threatened Ecological Community sign

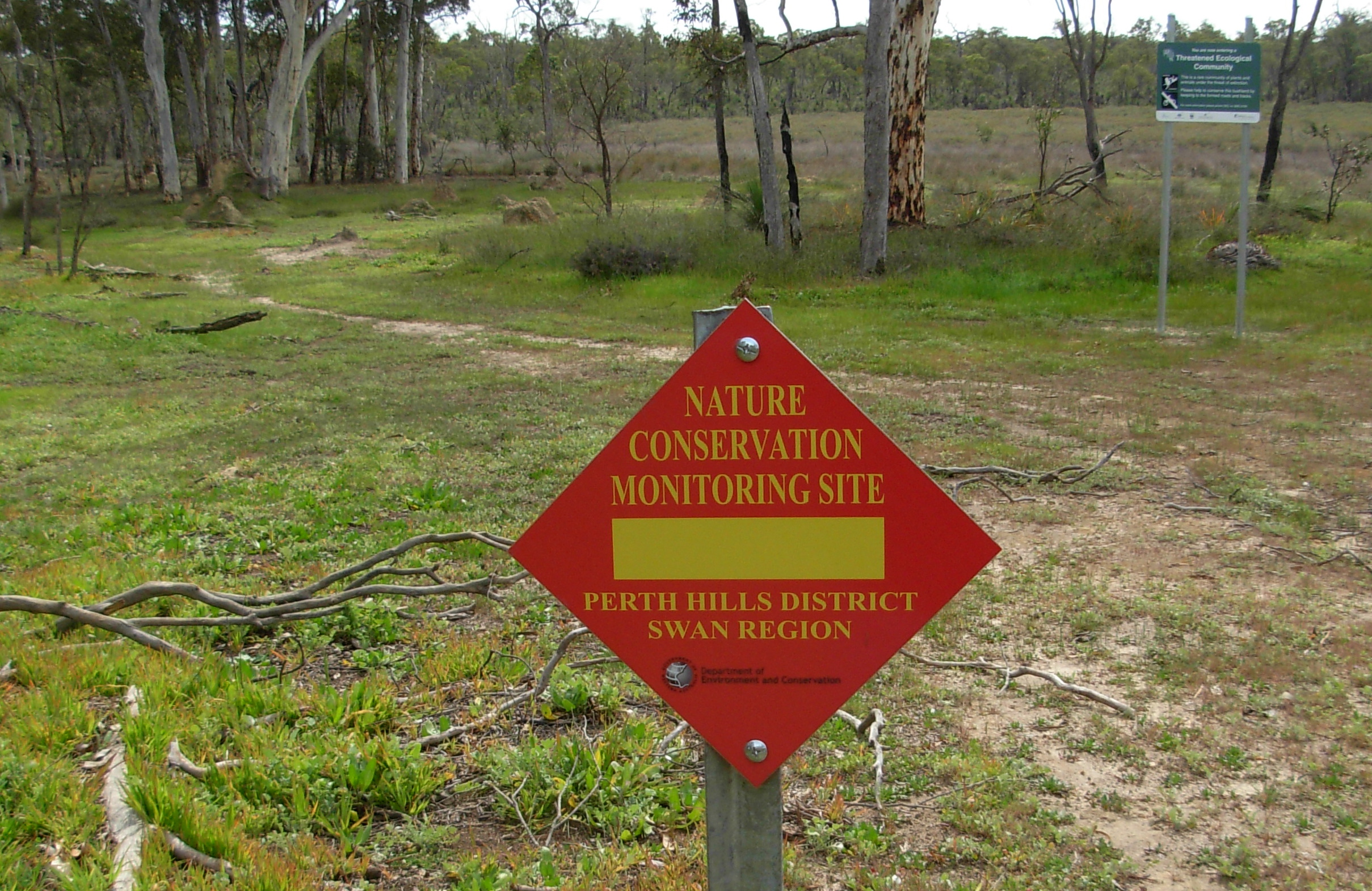
DEC Nature Conservation Monitoring Site sign – Perth Hills District, Swan Region

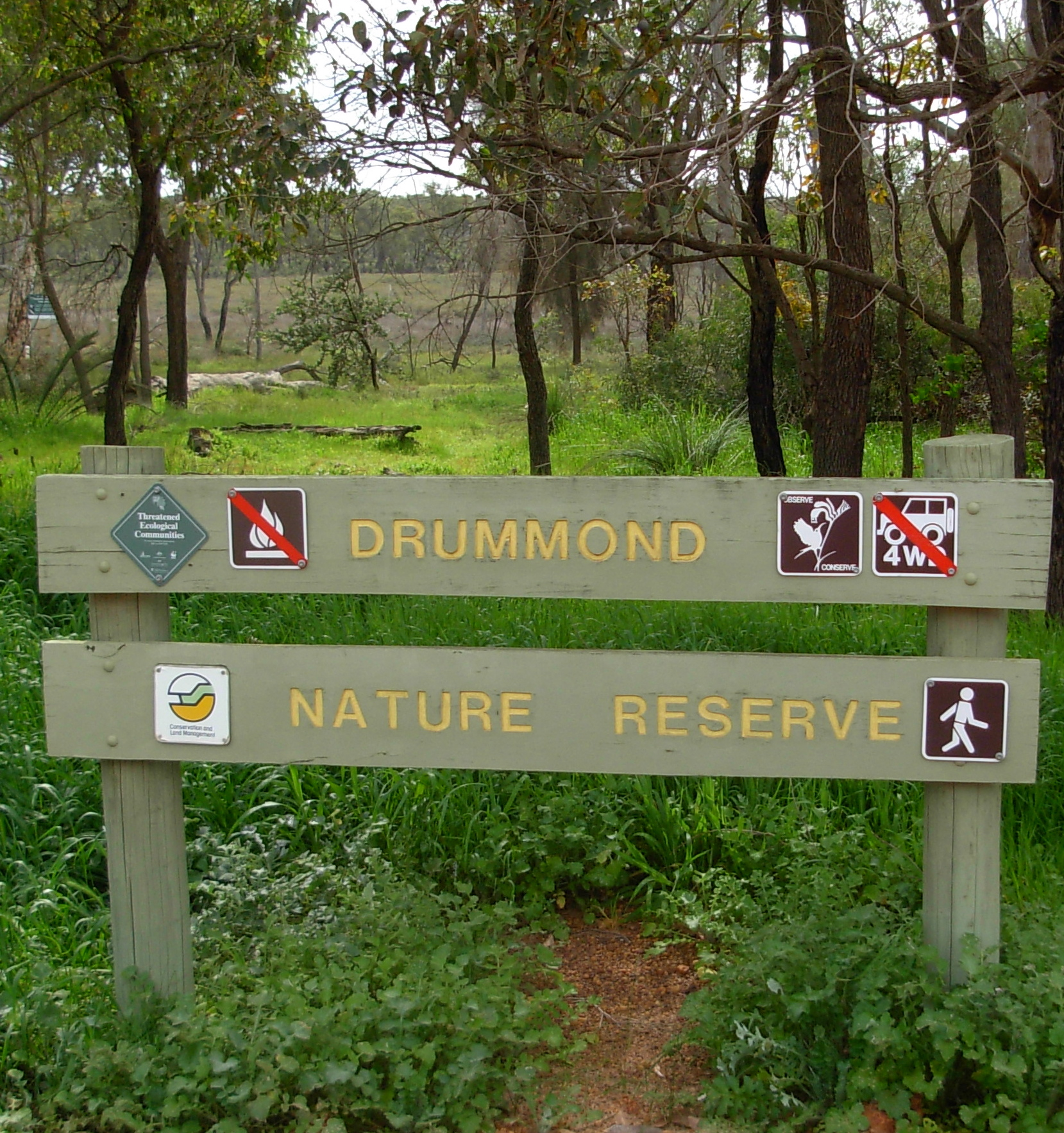
Old CALM sign with various labels, marsh area of south west corner in background

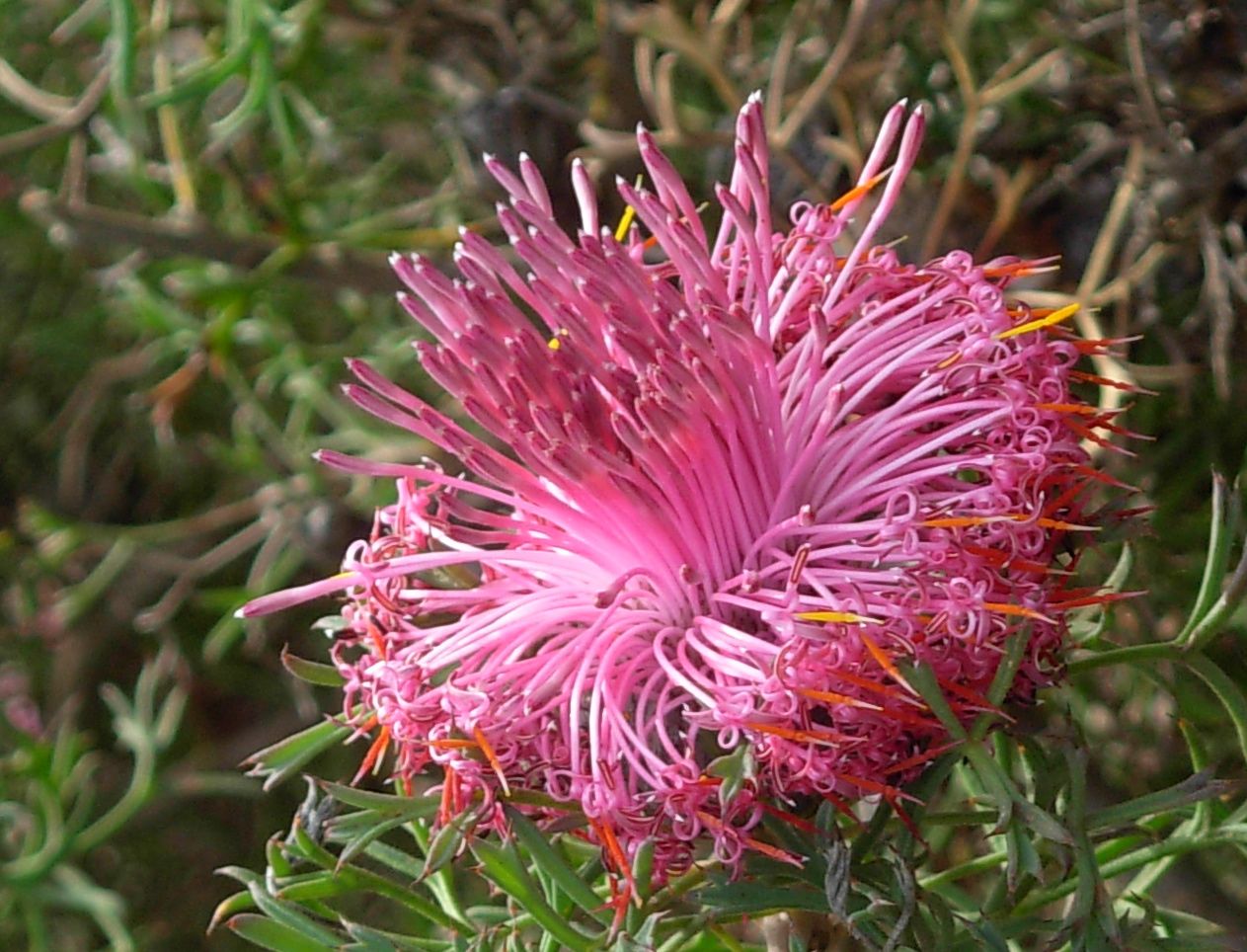
Isopogon dubius

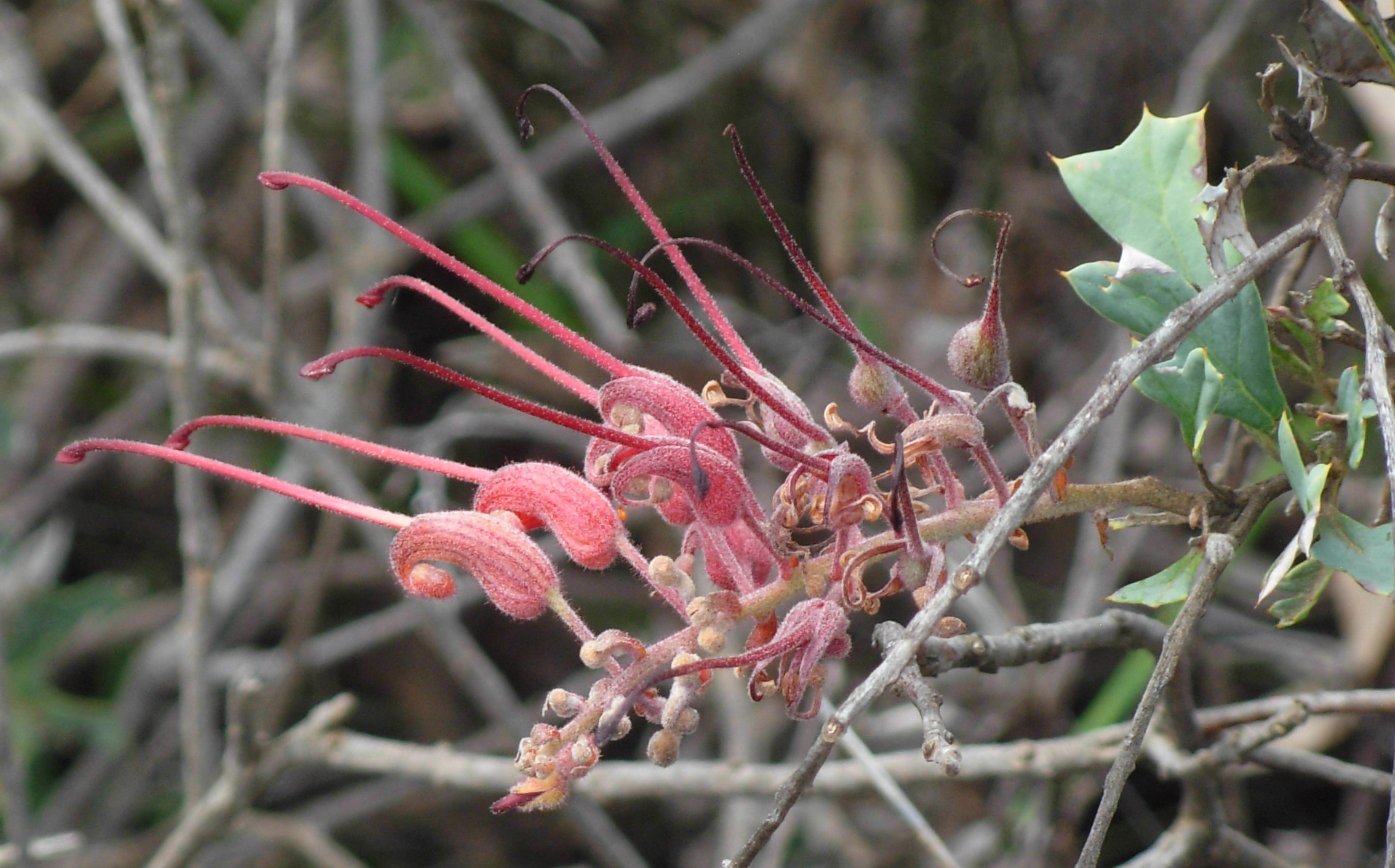
Grevillea bipinnatifida

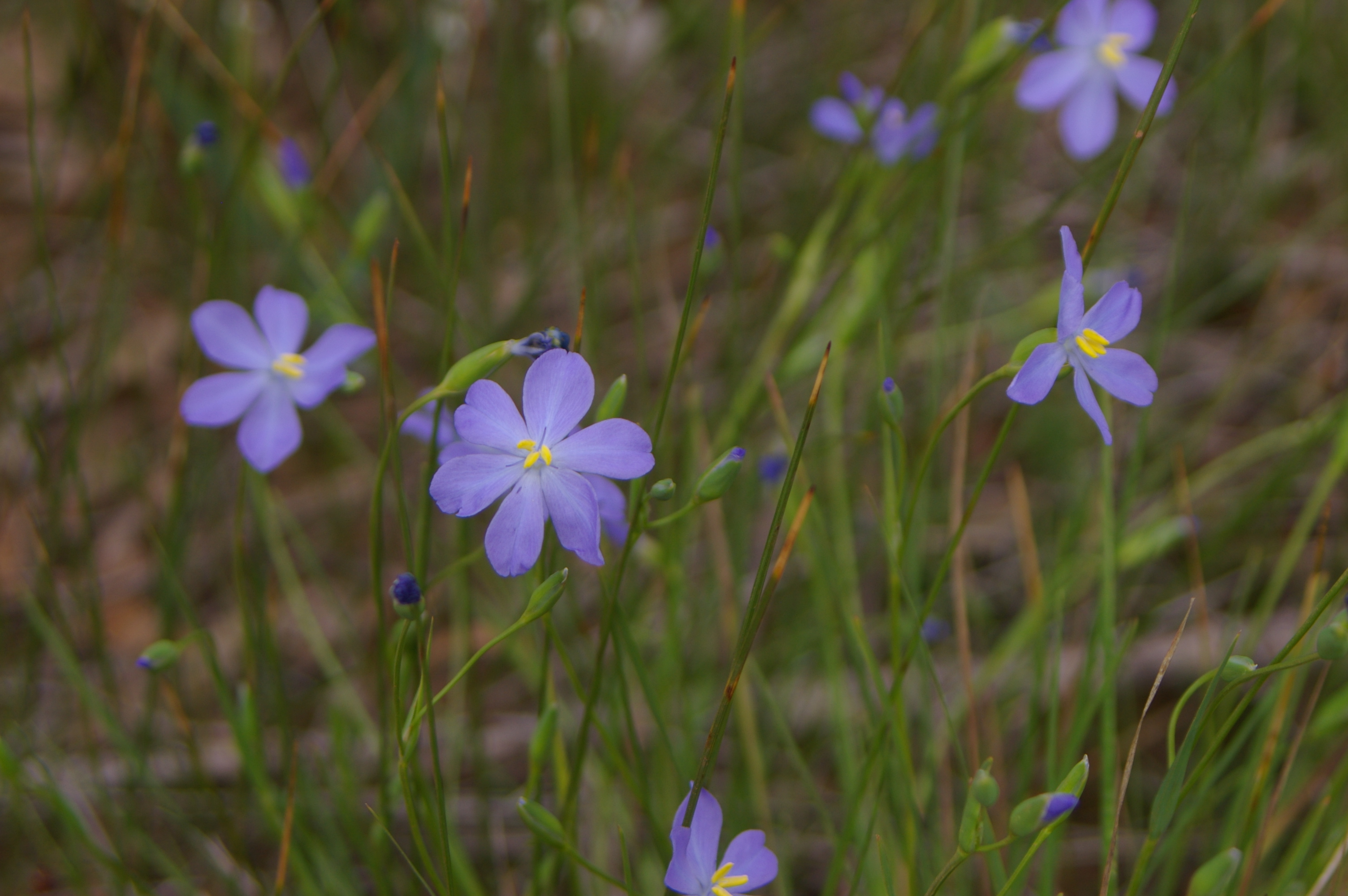
Orthrosanthus laxus
