= List of acts of the Parliament of Western Australia from 1951 =

This is a list of acts of the Parliament of Western Australia for the year 1951.

== 1951 ==
=== Public acts ===
Short title, or popular name	Citation	Royal assent
Long title
	No. 1 of 1951; 15 Geo. VI. No. 1	28 Aug 1951
An Act to apply out of the Consolidated Revenue Fund the sum of Six Million Pounds and from Moneys to Credit of the General Loan Fund Two Million Five Hundred Thousand Pounds, to the Service of the Year ending 30th June, 1952, and to apply out of the Public Account the sum of Five Hundred Thousand Pounds for the purpose of temporary Advances to be made by the Treasurer.
Public Buildings Act (Validation of Payments) Act 1951	No. 2 of 1951; 15 Geo. VI. No. 2	11 October 1951
An Act to validate and authorise certain payments into the Consolidated Revenue Fund.
Noxious Weeds Act Amendment Act 1951	No. 7 of 1951; 15 Geo. VI. No. 7	12 October 1951
An Act to amend the Noxious Weeds Act, 1950. (Note: Noxious Weeds Act 1950 ())
Wheat Marketing Act Amendment and Continuance Act 1951	No. 1 of 1951; 15 & 16 Geo. VI. No. 1	31 October 1951
An Act to amend and continue the operation of the Wheat Marketing Act, 1947. (Note: Wheat Marketing Act 1947 ())
Muja–Centaur Coal Mine Railway Act 1951	No. 9 of 1951; 15 & 16 Geo. VI. No. 9	20 November 1951
An Act to Authorise the Construction of a Railway from Muja to the Centaur Coal Mine.
Collie–Cardiff Railway Act 1951	No. 37 of 1951; 15 & 16 Geo. VI. No. 37	20 December 1951
An Act to authorise the Construction of a Railway from Collie to Cardiff.
Royal Visit 1952 Special Holiday Act 1951	No. 56 of 1951; 15 & 16 Geo. VI. No. 56	2 January 1952
An Act relating to the Observance of a Special Holiday in honour of the occasion of the Royal Visit in the year one thousand nine hundred and fifty-two.
	No. X of 1951	
Appropriation Act 1951-52	No. 63 of 1951; 15 & 16 Geo. VI. No. 63	7 January 1952
An Act to appropriate and apply out of the Consolidated Revenue Fund and from Moneys to Credit of the General Loan Fund and from the Public Account certain sums to make good the supplies granted for the service of the Year ending the thirtieth day of June, One thousand nine hundred and fifty-two, and to supplement grants made by the present Parliament during its First Session in adjustment of the Vote "Advance to Treasurer, 1950-51" for charges during the Year ended the 30th day of June, 1951; and to approve of certain expenditure under section forty-one of the Forests Act, 1918-1931. (Note: Forests Act 1918 (No. 8 of 1919))

=== Privat acts ===
Short title, or popular name	Citation	Royal assent
Long title
Perpetual Executors, Trustees and Agency Company (W.A.) Limited Act Amendment Act 1951	Private Act of 1951; 15 & 16 Geo. VI. Private Act	19 December 1951
An Act to amend The Perpetual Executors, Trustees and Agency Company (W.A.) Limited Act, 1922. (Note: Perpetual Executors, Trustees, and Agency Company (W.A.) Limited Act 1922 (Private Act of 1923))
West Australian Trustee, Executor and Agency Company Limited Act Amendment Act 1951	Private Act of 1951; 15 & 16 Geo. VI. Private Act	19 December 1951
An Act to amend The West Australian Trustee, Executor and Agency Company Limited Act. (Note: West Australian Trustee Executor and Agency Company Limited Act 1893 (56 Vict. Private Act))

== Sources ==
- "legislation.wa.gov.au".
