= List of acts of the Parliament of Western Australia from 1963 =

This is a list of acts of the Parliament of Western Australia for the year 1963.

== 1963 ==
Short title, or popular name	Citation	Royal assent
Long title
	No. 1 of 1963	15 August 1963
An Act to apply out of the Consolidated Revenue Fund the sum of Eighteen Million Pounds and from Moneys to Credit of the General Loan Fund Five Million Pounds, to the Service of the Year ending 30th June, 1964, and to apply out of the Public Account the sum of Two Million Pounds for the purpose of temporary Advances to be made by the Treasurer.
Reserves Act 1963	No. 2 of 1963	15 August 1963
An Act to cancel Reserves numbers 3421 and 3495 classified as of Class "A" and to create Reserve number 26741 for the purpose of the use and requirements of the Parliament and Government and classify it as of Class "A".
Metropolitan Region Town Planning Scheme Act Amendment Act 1963	No. 29 of 1963	13 November 1963
An Act to amend the Metropolitan Region Town Planning Scheme Act, 1959-1962. (Note: Metropolitan Region Town Planning Scheme Act 1959 (No. 78))
Midland Railway Company of Western Australia Limited Acquisition Agreement Act 1963	No. 47 of 1963	9 December 1963
An Act to approve an Agreement made between the Directors of the London Board of The Midland Railway Company of Western Australia Limited, The State, and the Commissioners of the Rural and Industries Bank of Western Australia, and for other purposes.
Railways (Standard Gauge) Construction Act Amendment Act 1963	No. 64 of 1963	18 December 1963
An Act to amend the Railways (Standard Gauge) Construction Act, 1961. (Note: Railways (Standard Gauge) Construction Act 1961 (No. 27))
	No. X of 1963	
Appropriation Act 1963-64	No. 88 of 1963	23 December 1963
An Act to appropriate and apply out of the Consolidated Revenue Fund and from Moneys to Credit of the General Loan Fund and from the Public Account certain sums to make good the supplies granted for the service of the Year ending the thirtieth day of June, One thousand nine hundred and sixty-four, and to supplement grants made by the present Parliament during its first Session in adjustment of the Vote "Advance to Treasurer, 1962-63," for charges during the Year ended the 30th day of June, 1963; and to approve of certain expenditure under section forty-one of the Forests Act, 1918-1954. (Note: Forests Act 1918 (No. 8 of 1919))

== Sources ==
- "legislation.wa.gov.au".
