= List of acts of the Parliament of Western Australia from 1967 =

This is a list of acts of the Parliament of Western Australia for the year 1967.

== 1967 ==
Short title, or popular name	Citation	Royal assent
Long title
Supply Act 1967	No. 1 of 1967	17 August 1967
An Act to apply out of the Consolidated Revenue Fund the sum of Forty Eight Million Dollars and from Moneys to Credit of the General Loan Fund Fifteen Million Dollars, to the Service of the Year ending 30th June, 1968, and to apply out of the Public Account the Sum of Five Million Dollars for the purpose of temporary Advances to be made by the Treasurer.
Railway (Collie–Griffin Mine Railway) Discontinuance Act 1967	No. 38 of 1967	21 November 1967
An Act to authorise the Discontinuance of portion of the Collie–Griffin Mine Railway and for incidental purposes.
Railway (Midland–Walkaway Railway) Discontinuance Act 1967	No. 43 of 1967	21 November 1967
An Act to authorise the Discontinuance of portions of the Midland–Walkaway Railway and for incidental purposes.
Kwinana–Mundijong–Jarrahdale Railway Extension Act 1967	No. 62 of 1967	5 December 1967
An Act to authorise the construction of a railway to extend the Kwinana–Mundijong–Jarrandale Railway.
Statute Law Revision Act 1967	No. 68 of 1967	5 December 1967
An Act to revise the Statute Law by repealing spent unnecessary or superseded enactments.
	No. X of 1967	
Appropriation Act 1967-68	No. 80 of 1967	11 December 1967
An Act to appropriate and apply out of the Consolidated Revenue Fund and from Moneys to Credit of the General Loan Fund and from the Public Account certain sums to make good the supplies granted for the service of the Year ending the thirtieth day of June, One thousand nine hundred and sixty-eight, and to supplement grants made by the present Parliament during its second Session in adjustment of the Vote "Advance to Treasurer, 1966-67," for charges during the Year ended the 30th day of June, 1967; and to approve of certain expenditure under section forty-one of the Forests Act, 1918-1964. (Note: Forests Act 1918 (No. 8 of 1919))

== Sources ==
- "legislation.wa.gov.au".
