= List of acts of the Parliament of Western Australia from 1959 =

This is a list of acts of the Parliament of Western Australia for the year 1959.

== 1959 ==
Short title, or popular name	Citation	Royal assent
Long title
Electoral Districts (Cancellation of Proclamation) Act 1959	No. 1 of 1959	7 July 1959
An Act to cancel a Proclamation promulgated pursuant to the power conferred by the Electoral Districts Act, 1947, (Note: Electoral Districts Act 1947 (No. 51)) to cancel the appointment of certain Electoral Commissioners made under that Act and for other purposes.
State Hotels (Disposal) Act 1959	No. 42 of 1959	10 November 1959
An Act to authorise the Governor to sell or lease certain State Hotels and Property appurtenant thereto, to make provision for the licensing of those hotels when sold or leased and for matters incidental thereto.
Metropolitan Region Town Planning Scheme Act 1959 (repealed)	No. 78 of 1959	14 December 1959
An Act to provide for and relating to the Planning and Development of land within the Metropolitan Region, for the purposes of constituting the Metropolitan Region Planning Authority, to regulate the assessment of a Metropolitan Improvement Tax and for incidental and other purposes. (Repealed by [[Planning and Development (Consequential and Transitional Provisions) Act 2005]] (No. 38))
	No. X of 1959	
Appropriation Act 1959-60	No. 83 of 1959	16 December 1959
An Act to appropriate and apply out of the Consolidated Revenue Fund and from Moneys to Credit of the General Loan Fund and from the Public Account certain sums to make good the supplies granted for the service of the Year ending the thirtieth day of June, One thousand nine hundred and sixty, and to supplement grants made by the last Parliament during its third Session in adjustment of the Vote "Advance to Treasurer, 1958-59," for charges during the Year ended the 30th day of June, 1959; and to approve of certain expenditure under section forty-one of the Forests Act, 1918-1954. (Note: Forests Act 1918 (No. 8 of 1919))

== Sources ==
- "legislation.wa.gov.au".
