= List of acts of the Parliament of Western Australia from 1919 =

This is a list of acts of the Parliament of Western Australia for the year 1919.

== 1919 ==
=== Public acts ===
Short title, or popular name	Citation	Royal assent
Long title
Permanent Reserve (Cottesloe) Act 1918	No. 1 of 1919	3 January 1919
An Act to excise portion of Permanent Reserve A↑208.
Forests Act 1918	No. 9 of 1919	3 January 1919
An Act to provide for the better Management and Protection of Forests.
Midland Railway Act 1919	No. 24 of 1919	15 November 1919
An Act to vest in the Midland Railway Company of Western Australia, Limited, the lands acquired for the purpose of its railway, and to apply to its railway certain of the provisions of the Government Railways Act, 1904. (Note: Government Railways Act 1904 (No. 23 of 1904))
Perth Mint Act Amendment Act 1919	No. 28 of 1919	26 November 1919
An Act to further amend the Perth Mint Act, 1895. (Note: Perth Mint Act 1895 (59 Vict. No. 12))
Coolgardie Goldfields Water Supply Loan Act Amendment Act 1919	No. 36 of 1919	17 December 1919
An Act to amend the Coolgardie Goldfields Water Supply Loan Act, 1896. (Note: Coolgardie Goldfields Water Supply Loan Act 1896 (60 Vict. No. 12))
Carnarvon Electric Light and Power Act 1919	No. 44 of 1919	17 December 1919
An Act to ratify the Purchase by the Carnarvon Municipal Council of certain Electric Light and Power Works, and a Loan raised by the said Council for that purpose, and to authorise the levy of a special rate to enable the said Council to pay interest on and contributions to a sinking fund for the redemption of the said Loan.
Ajana–Geraldine Railway Act 1919	No. 46 of 1919	17 December 1919
An Act to authorise the construction and working of a Railway from the "Surprise" Mine at Geraldine to Ajana.
Zoological Gardens Act Amendment Act 1919	No. 49 of 1919	17 December 1919
An Act to further amend the Zoological Gardens Act, 1898. (Note: Zoological Gardens Act 1898 (62 Vict. No. 32))
Wyalcatchem–Mount Marshall Railway Extension Act 1919	No. 52 of 1919	17 December 1919
An Act to authorise an Extension of the Wyaleatehem–Mount Marshall Railway.
	No. X of 1919	
Parliamentary Allowances Act Amendment Act 1919	No. 63 of 1919	16 December 1919
An Act to amend the Parliamentary Allowances Act, 1911. (Note: Parliamentary Allowances Act 1911 (No. 33))

=== Private acts ===
Short title, or popular name	Citation	Royal assent
Long title
Anglo-Persian Oil Company Limited's (Private) Act 1919	Private Act of 1919	17 December 1919
An Act to grant to the Anglo-Persian Oil Company, Limited, powers and provisions for the Storage and Supply of Oil, and for other purposes.

== Sources ==
- "legislation.wa.gov.au".
