= List of acts of the Parliament of Western Australia from 1970 =

This is a list of acts of the Parliament of Western Australia for the year 1970.

== 1970 ==
| Short title, or popular name | Citation | Royal assent |
Long title
| Police Act Amendment Act 1970 | No. 1 of 1970 | 29 April 1970 |
An Act to amend the Police Act, 1892-1969. (Note: Police Act 1892 (55 Vict. No. 27))
| Statute Law Revision Act 1970 | No. 10 of 1970 | 29 April 1970 |
An Act to revise the Statute Law by repealing spent, unnecessary or superseded enactments, to give short titles to certain Acts of Parliament and to amend the short titles of others.
| | No. X of 1970 | |
| Appropriation Act (Consolidated Revenue Fund) 1970-1971 | No. 122 of 1970 | 10 December 1970 |
An Act to appropriate and apply out of the Consolidated Revenue Fund and from the Public Account certain sums to make good the supplies granted for the service of the Year ending the 30th day of June, 1971, and to supplement grants made by the present Parliament during its second Session in adjustment of the Vote "Advance to Treasurer, 1969-70", for charges during the Year ended the 30th day of June, 1970; and to approve of certain expenditure under section forty-one of the Forests Act, 1918-1969. (Note: Forests Act 1918 (No. 8 of 1919))

== Sources ==
- "legislation.wa.gov.au".
