= List of acts of the Parliament of Western Australia from 1966 =

This is a list of acts of the Parliament of Western Australia for the year 1966.

== 1966 ==
Short title, or popular name	Citation	Royal assent
Long title
	No. 1 of 1966	16 August 1966
An Act to apply out of the Consolidated Revenue Fund the sum of Forty-two Million Dollars and from Moneys to Credit of the General Loan Fund Fourteen Million Dollars, to the Service of the Year ending 30th June, 1967, and to apply out of the Public Account the Sum of Five Million Dollars for the purpose of temporary Advances to be made by the Treasurer.
Commonwealth and State Housing Agreement Act 1966	No. 2 of 1966	16 September 1966
An Act relating to Financial Assistance from the Commonwealth for the purposes of Housing.
Industrial Lands (Kwinana) Railway Act 1966	No. 15 of 1966	17 October 1966
An Act to authorise the construction of a railway from the Kenwick to Kwinana Railway.
	No. 32 of 1966	27 October 1966
An Act to apply out of the Consolidated Revenue Find the sum of Forty Million Dollars, and from Moneys to Credit of the General Loan Fund Ten Million Dollars to the Service of the Year ending 30th June, 1967.
Road and Air Transport Commission Act 1966 or the Transport Commission Act 1966 or the Transport Act 1966 or the Transport Co-ordination Act 1966	No. 53 of 1966	5 December 1966
An Act to ~~establish a Commission provide for the appointment and functions of a Commissioner of Transport, to control and license and to make provision as to the review, licensing and control of the transport of passengers and goods by road, and by Air rail, air, and sea and as to the construction or closure of railways; for the progressive removal of measures which hinder the efficient and safe transport of goods; as to and to control the operation of ships engaged in the coasting trade; as to the minimum rates of remuneration payable in respect of the operation of commercial goods vehicles pursuant to sub-contracts; and as to the~~ to provide for the co-ordination, planning and advancement of all forms of transport in this State, ~~in certain circumstances to provide or to arrange for the provision of certain forms of public transport,~~ to provide for the review, control and licensing of transport services ~~and to provide for~~ ~~the licensing of certain persons who carry on the business of selling petroleum products~~ and for incidental and other purposes.
Perth Medical Centre Act 1966 or the Queen Elizabeth II Medical Centre Act 1966	No. 54 of 1966	5 December 1966
An Act to enable a Medical Centre to be established at Hollywood by reserving certain lands therefor and constituting a body corporate for the development, management and control of those lands and for incidental and other purposes.
Pensioners (Rates Exemption) Act 1966 or the Pensioners (Rates Rebates and Deferments) Act 1966	No. 58 of 1966	12 December 1966
An Act to ~~exempt~~ entitle certain pensioners ~~under certain Commonwealth Acts from liability for the payment of~~ to Rebates of, or Deferments of payment of, amounts payable for Rates or Charges under the Metropolitan Water Supply, Sewerage, and Drainage Act, 1909~~-1965~~, (Note: Metropolitan Water Supply, Sewerage, and Drainage Act 1909 (No. 43)) as amended from time to time, and other Acts, as so amended; to repeal the Pensioners (Rates Exemption) Act, 1922-1943; (Note: Pensioners (Rates Exemption) Act 1922 (No. 18 of 1923)) and for incidental and other purposes.
Kewdale Lands Development Act 1966 or the Industrial Lands Development Authority Act 1966	No. 60 of 1966	12 December 1966
An Act to make further and better provision for Railway Marshalling Yards and Services at or near Kewdale, to make provision for the Development, under existing law, of Lands in the Kewdale and Cloverdale and other Areas for Industry, to establish the Industrial Lands Development Authority, and for incidental and other purposes.
Statute Law Revision Act 1966	No. 79 of 1966	12 December 1966
An Act to revise the Statute Law by repealing spent unnecessary or superseded enactments and for other purposes.
Statute Law Revision Act (No. 2) 1966	No. 80 of 1966	12 December 1966
An Act to revise the Statute Law by repealing unnecessary enactments.
Statute Law Revision (Short Titles) Act 1966	No. 81 of 1966	12 December 1966
An Act to give short titles to certain Acts of Parliament.
Western Australian Institute of Technology Act 1966 or the Curtin University of Technology Act 1966 or the Curtin University Act 1966	No. 94 of 1966	12 December 1966
An Act to establish and incorporate ~~The Western Australian Institute~~ Curtin University ~~of Technology~~ and for incidental and other purposes.
	No. X of 1966	
Local Government Act Amendment Act 1966	No. 96 of 1966	12 December 1966
An Act to amend the Local Government Act, 1960-1965. (Note: Local Government Act 1960 (No. 84))
Appropriation Act 1966-67	No. 97 of 1966	12 December 1966
An Act to appropriate and apply out of the Consolidated Revenue Fund and from Moneys to Credit of the General Loan Fund and from the Public Account certain sums to make good the supplies granted for the service of the Year ending the thirtieth day of June, One thousand nine hundred and sixty-seven, and to supplement grants made by the present Parliament during its first Session in adjustment of the Vote "Advance to Treasurer, 1965-66," for charges during the Year ended the 30th day of June, 1966; and to approve of certain expenditure under section forty-one of the Forests Act, 1918-1964. (Note: Forests Act 1918 (No. 8 of 1919))

== Sources ==
- "legislation.wa.gov.au".
