= Cyathochaeta avenacea =

Scientific classification
- Kingdom: Plantae
- Clade: Tracheophytes
- Clade: Angiosperms
- Clade: Monocots
- Clade: Commelinids
- Order: Poales
- Family: Cyperaceae
- Genus: Cyathochaeta
- Species: C. avenacea

Binomial name
- Cyathochaeta avenacea (R.Br.) Benth.

Species of grass-like plant

Cyathochaeta avenacea is a sedge of the family Cyperaceae that is native to Australia.

The monoecious and rhizomatous perennial sedge with a tufted habit that typically grows to a height of 0.4 to 1.6 metres (1.3 to 5.2 ft) and to about 1 m (3.3 ft) wide. The plant blooms between November and March producing brown flowers.

In Western Australia it is found along the coast in peaty-swampy areas along the coast of the Wheatbelt, Peel, South West, Great Southern and Goldfields-Esperance regions where it grows in lateritic loam to sandy soils.
