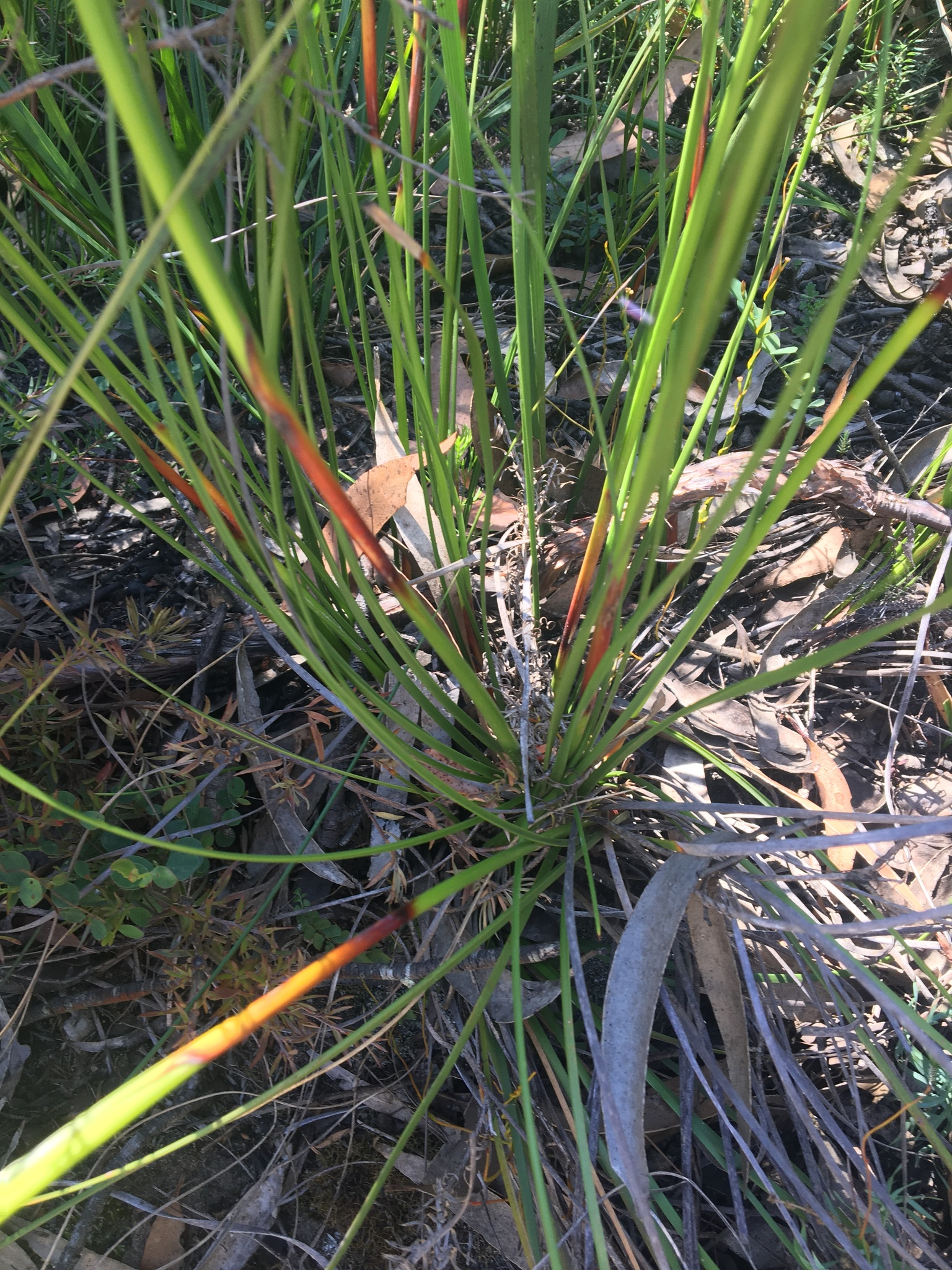
- Cyathochaeta diandra

Scientific classification
- Kingdom: Plantae
- Clade: Tracheophytes
- Clade: Angiosperms
- Clade: Monocots
- Clade: Commelinids
- Order: Poales
- Family: Cyperaceae
- Genus: Cyathochaeta; Nees

Synonyms
- Tetralepis Steud.

= Cyathochaeta =

Genus of grass-like plants

Cyathochaeta is a genus of rhizomatous perennial sedges.

They have culms that are mostly noded. The leaves are mostly basal, often with one cauline and have ligule membranes. When flowering they produce a panicle-like, narrow inflorescence with distant nodes containing several spikelets at each node with a single bisexual flower.

There are five known species all of which are endemic to Australia.

The genus was first described in 1848 by the German botanist Christian Gottfried Daniel Nees von Esenbeck.

== Species ==
- Cyathochaeta avenacea (R.Br.) Benth.
- Cyathochaeta clandestina (R.Br.) Benth.
- Cyathochaeta diandra (R.Br.) Nees
- Cyathochaeta equitans K.L.Wilson
- Cyathochaeta stipoides K.L.Wilson
