= Cyathochaeta diandra =

Conservation status
- Least Concern (IUCN 3.1)

Scientific classification
- Kingdom: Plantae
- Clade: Tracheophytes
- Clade: Angiosperms
- Clade: Monocots
- Clade: Commelinids
- Order: Poales
- Family: Cyperaceae
- Genus: Cyathochaeta
- Species: C. diandra

Binomial name
- Cyathochaeta diandra (R.Br.) Nees

Synonyms
- Carpha diandra R.Br.; Chaetospora diandra (R.Br.) F.Muell.; Cyathochaeta avenacea var. teretifolia (W.Fitzg.) Kük.; Cyathochaeta teretifolia W.Fitzg.; Rhynchospora diandra (R.Br.) Spreng.

Species of grass-like plant

Cyathochaeta diandra is a sedge of the family Cyperaceae that is native to eastern and southeastern Australia. It is commonly known as sheath rush or spear grass.

It is a tufted sedge which flowers in spring and summer. It is native to southern Queensland, New South Wales, and northeastern Victoria states from sea level to 1000 metres elevation. It grows in sandy soils, often over sandstone or laterite, in coastal and inland dry sclerophyll forest and woodland, often associated with species of Eucalyptus, Acacia, and Leptospermum, and in heath and scrub. It is common on roadsides.
