= Cyathochaeta clandestina =

Scientific classification
- Kingdom: Plantae
- Clade: Tracheophytes
- Clade: Angiosperms
- Clade: Monocots
- Clade: Commelinids
- Order: Poales
- Family: Cyperaceae
- Genus: Cyathochaeta
- Species: C. clandestina

Binomial name
- Cyathochaeta clandestina (R.Br.) Benth.

Species of grass-like plant

Cyathochaeta clandestina is a sedge of the family Cyperaceae that is native to Australia.

The rhizomatous perennial sedge with a tufted habit that typically grows to a height of 0.4 to 2 metres (1.3 to 6.6 ft) and to about 1.7 m (5.6 ft) wide. The plant blooms between October and December producing brown flowers.

In Western Australia it is found along the coast along the margins of streams and in swampy areas along the coast of the South West and Great Southern regions where it grows in sandy soils.
