= Cyathochaeta stipoides =

Conservation status
- Priority Three — Poorly Known Taxa (DEC)

Scientific classification
- Kingdom: Plantae
- Clade: Tracheophytes
- Clade: Angiosperms
- Clade: Monocots
- Clade: Commelinids
- Order: Poales
- Family: Cyperaceae
- Genus: Cyathochaeta
- Species: C. stipoides

Binomial name
- Cyathochaeta stipoides K.L.Wilson

Species of grass-like plant

Cyathochaeta stipoides is a sedge of the family Cyperaceae that is native to Australia.

The caespitose and perennial sedge typically grows to a height of 0.25 to 1.0 metre (0.8 to 3.3 ft). The plant blooms between October and January producing red-brown flowers.

In Western Australia it is found on seasonally wet areas mostly along the south coast in the South West regions where it grows in sandy soils.

It was first described in 1997 by Karen Wilson.
