= Department of Conservation and Land Management =

Former government department in Western Australia

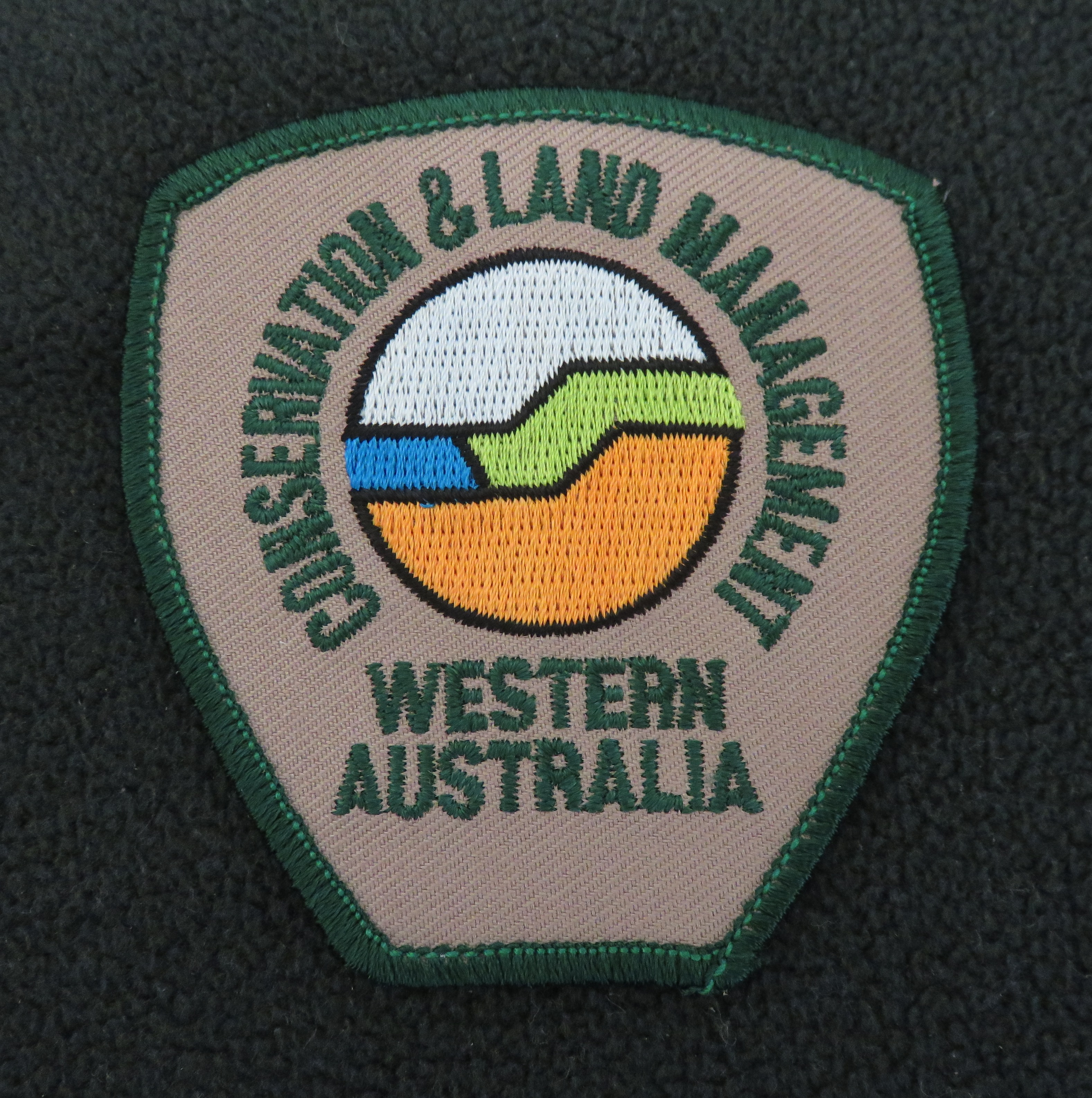
- Generic (Western Australia) shoulder patch for Western Australia Department of Conservation and Land Management staff uniform in 2005.

Agency overview
- Formed: 22 March 1985
- Preceding agencies: Forests Department; National Parks Authority; Wildlife section of the Department of Fisheries and Wildlife
- Dissolved: 2006
- Superseding agency: Department of Environment and Conservation
- Jurisdiction: Government of Western Australia
- Agency executives: Dr Syd SHEA, Executive Director; Mr Keiran McNamara †, Executive Director
- Child agencies: Department of Environment and Conservation; Forest Products Commission
- Website: calm.wa.gov.au (archive)

Conservation and Land Management Act 1984

Parliament of Western Australia

The Department of Conservation and Land Management (CALM) was a department of the Government of Western Australia that was responsible for implementing the state's conservation and environment legislation and regulations. It was created by the Conservation and Land Management Act 1984, also known as the CALM Act, which is still in force as of 2020.

The Department of Conservation and Land Management was responsible from 22 March 1985 to 30 June 2006 for protecting and conserving the State of Western Australia’s environment; this included managing the state's national parks, marine parks, conservation parks, state forests, timber reserves and nature reserves.

The Conservation Commission of Western Australia, responsible for assessing and auditing the performance of the department, was also created by the CALM Act. Now (as of 2020 renamed the Conservation and Parks Commission), its functions have broadened, with its purpose stated as "to act as an independent and trusted community steward and government advisor for the protection of Western Australia’s biodiversity and conservation estate while fostering its appreciation and sustainable use".

== Status (at dissolution, 30 June 2006) ==
CALM had management responsibilities in:

- 97 national parks (5 593 536 ha)
- conservation parks (843,155 ha)
- 9 marine parks (1,261,166 ha)
- 1 marine nature reserve (1 489 461 ha)
- 2 marine management areas (143,385 ha)
- nature reserves (10 860 832 ha)
- state forests (1,304,619 ha)
- timber reserves (123,344 ha)
- other recreational / conservation reserves, freehold and other managed lands (6,200,799 ha)

At 30 June 2006, the total area under CALM’s care was 26,339,492 ha. The land area managed by the department was about 9.78% of the land area of Western Australia.

CALM-managed lands and waters received 11,842,000 visits during 2005–2006.

Between 1998 and 2006, the number of people registered as volunteers with the department grew from 836 to 3,882 with 470,600 hours contributed.

Between 2000 and 2006, the CALM Bush Ranger cadets program showed an increase from 800 to 1,215 Bush Ranger cadets that contributed a total of 268,375 hours to conservation projects just on the last scholar year (2005).

CALM was responsible for the wildlife conservation project Western Shield which is pest animal control (more than 3.9 million hectares of conservation reserves and State forests baited for feral animal control).

CALM also managed two long distance trails:

- the Bibbulmun Track for walkers, where the analysis of the data collected from the campsite registers has revealed that:
  - the average length of a walk was 17.5 days
  - more than 20% of the walkers were from interstate and overseas
  - 122 people registered as End to End walkers in 2005–2006
- the Munda Biddi Trail for cyclists, where the analysis of the data collected from the campsite registers has revealed that:
  - the average length of a ride was 3.6 days
  - more than 20% of cyclists are from interstate and overseas

An important duty of the department was wildfire prevention and suppression on its lands as well as fire prevention in unallocated Crown land and unmanaged reserves (89.1 million ha transferred from Department of Land Administration on 1 July 2003) by:

- managing fuel loads through prescribed burning (in 2005–2006, the prescribed burning program achieved 194,105 ha in the South-West forest regions, close to the nominal target of 200,000 ha per year and 448,529 ha for all regions) and other means
- responding to wildfires (in 2005–2006, 480 wildfires were attended through the State with a total area of 2,687,516 ha)
- undertaking research into fire behaviour and effects

Some of the most severe wildfires that the department had to help to suppress, in chronological order, include:

Fire	Location	Area burned (1 ha ≈ 2.5 acres)	Date	Human fatalities	Livestock death/properties damaged
1997 Perth and SW Region wildfires	Western Australia	23,000 ha	2 December 1997	2 (21 injuries)	1 home lost

== Preceding agencies ==
Earlier forms of nature conservation in Western Australia were under:

- Department of Lands and Surveys: 1 January 1890 – (partly split) 31 December 1895
- Wood and Forests Department: 1 January 1896 – 31 December 1918
- Forests Department: 1 January 1919 – 21 March 1985
- State Gardens Board: 15 December 1920 – 30 April 1957 (Parks and Reserves Act 1895)
- National Parks Board: 1 May 1957 – 30 July 1977
- Department of Fisheries and Fauna: 1 October 1964 – 31 December 1973
- National Parks Authority: 1 August 1977 – 15 April 1985 (National Parks Authority Act 1976)
- Wildlife section of the Department of Fisheries and Wildlife: 1 January 1974 – 21 March 1985

== Vehicles ==
The department maintained and coordinated a range of specialist equipment and emergency response vehicles. This included pumpers and tankers and other equipment relating to operations involving search and rescue and firefighting.

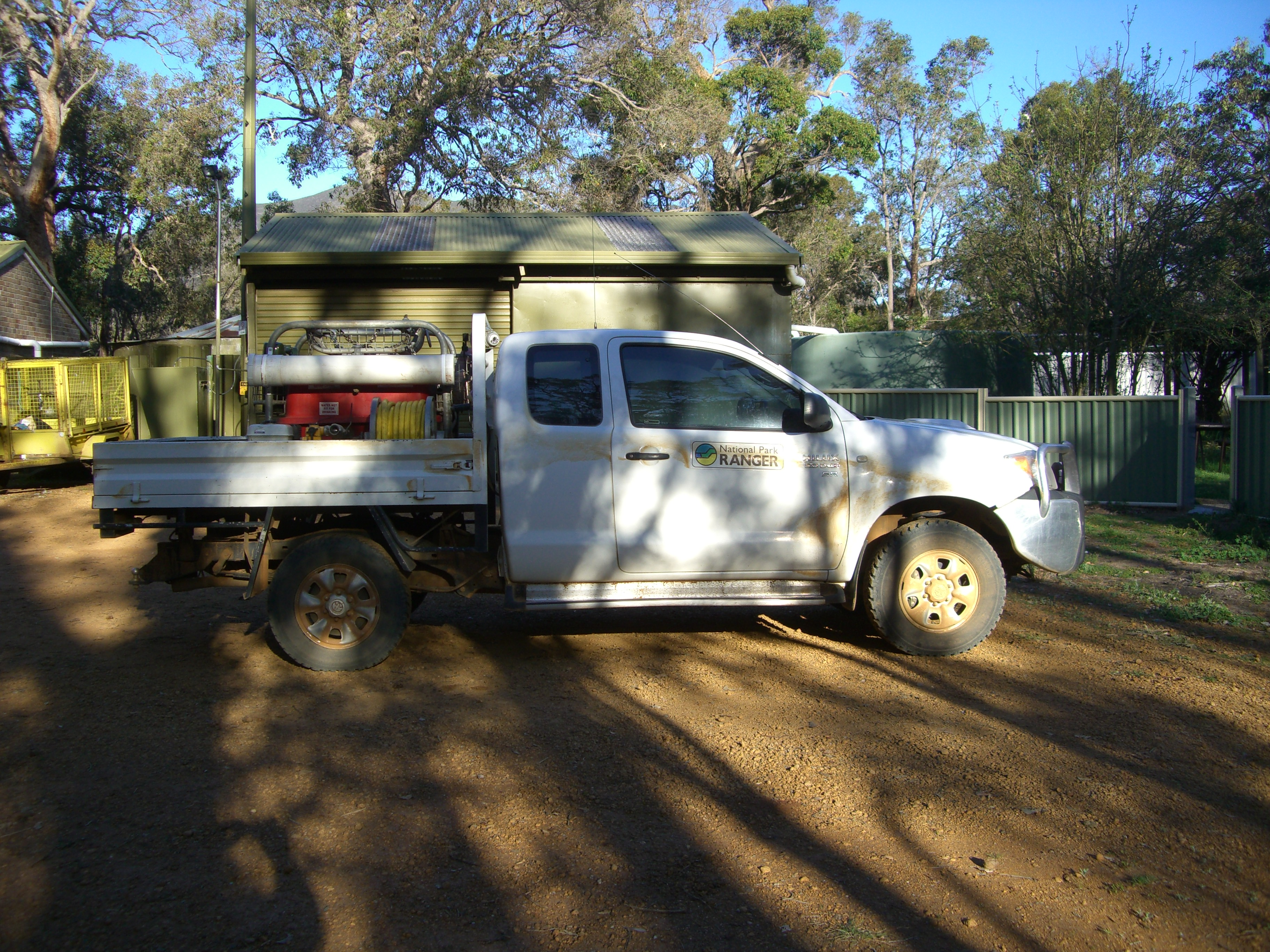
Toyota Hilux 3.0 D4D DR with light pumper at Stirling Range National Park ranger station, October 2005.

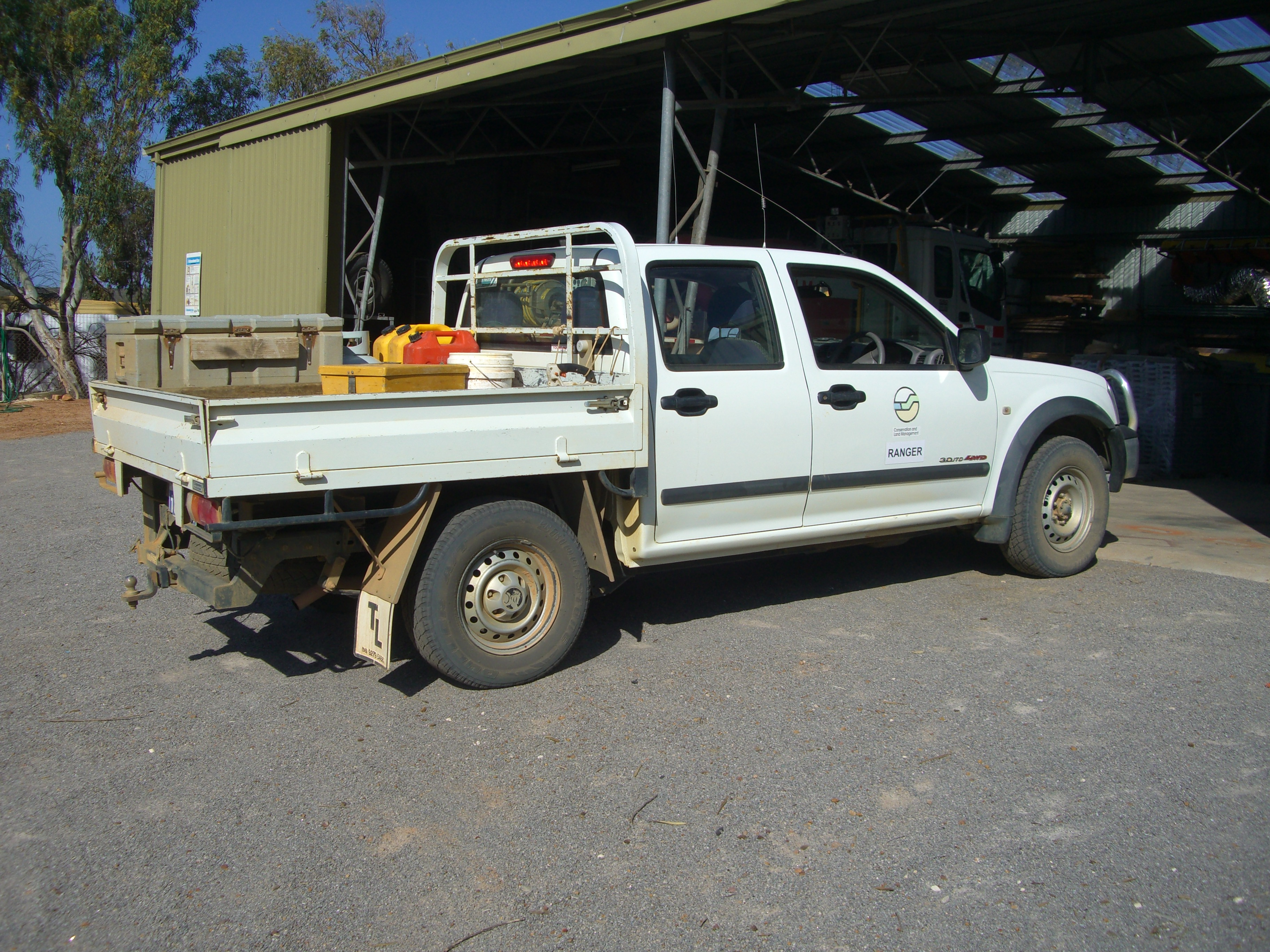
Toyota Hilux 3.0 iTD 4WD at Kalbarri National Park ranger station, October 2005.

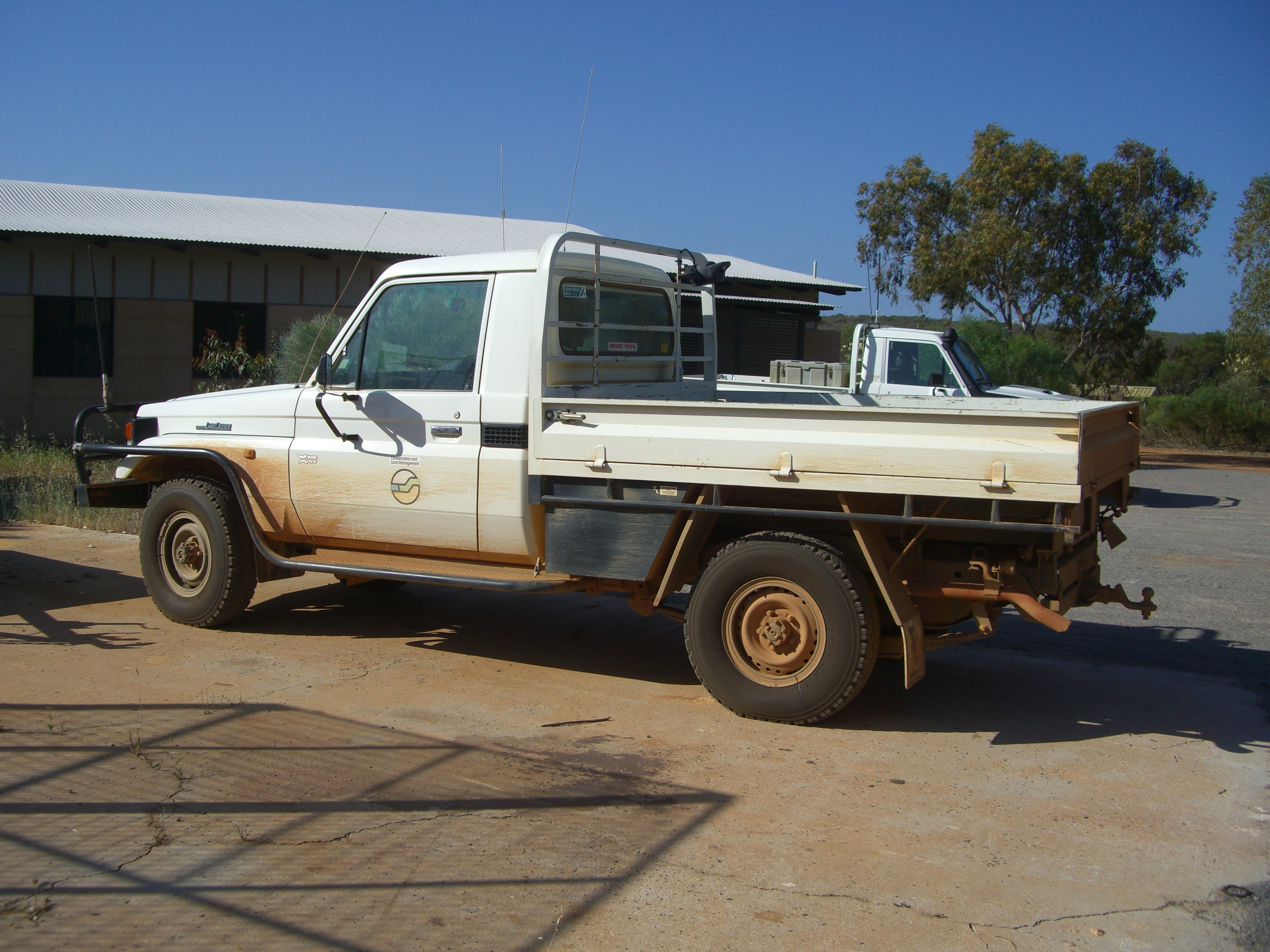
Toyota LandCruiser Work Mate 4WD at Kalbarri National Park ranger station, October 2005.

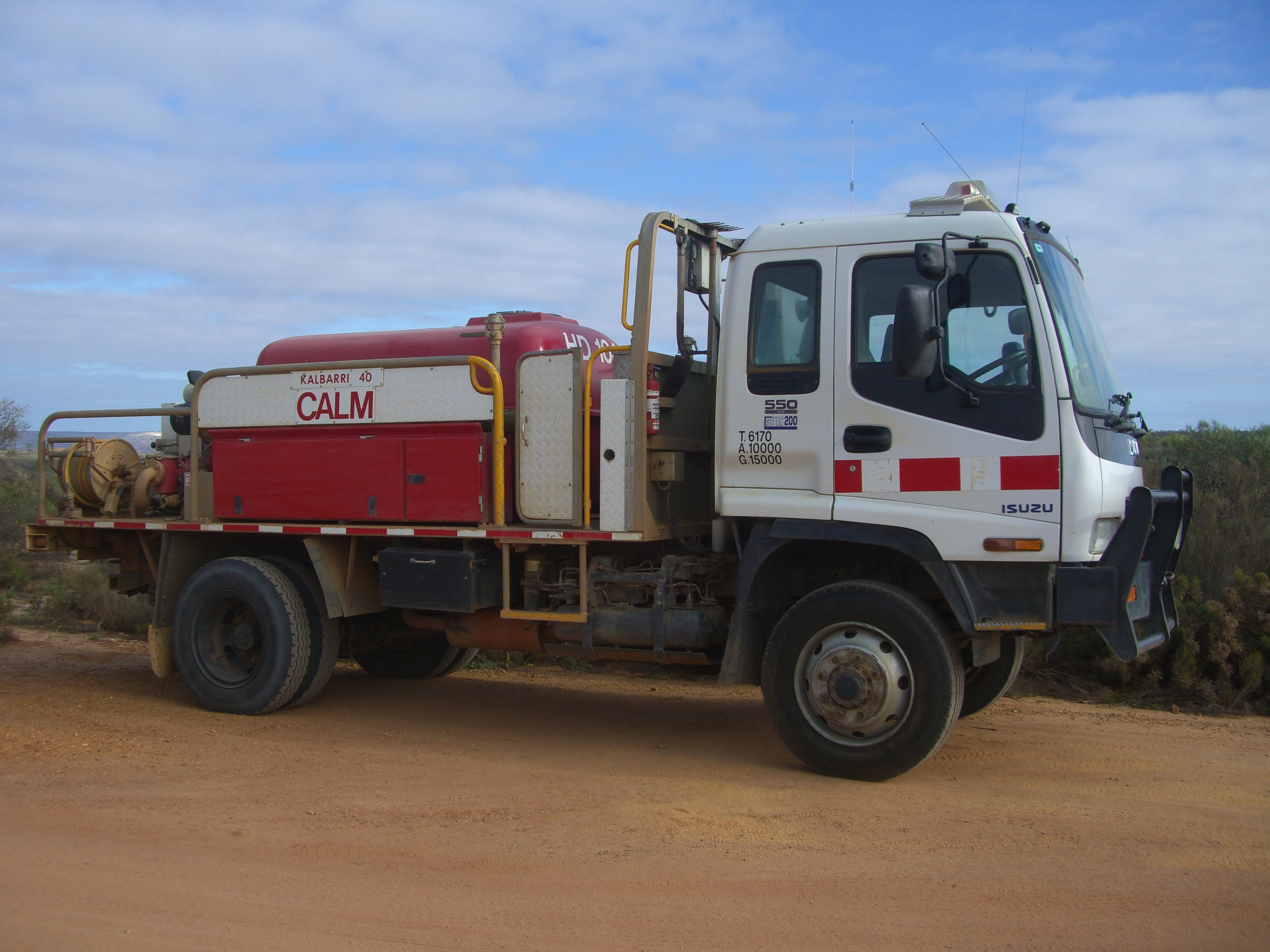
Heavy duty fire appliance Isuzu 550 (HD104 – Kalbarri 40) at Kalbarri National Park, October 2005.

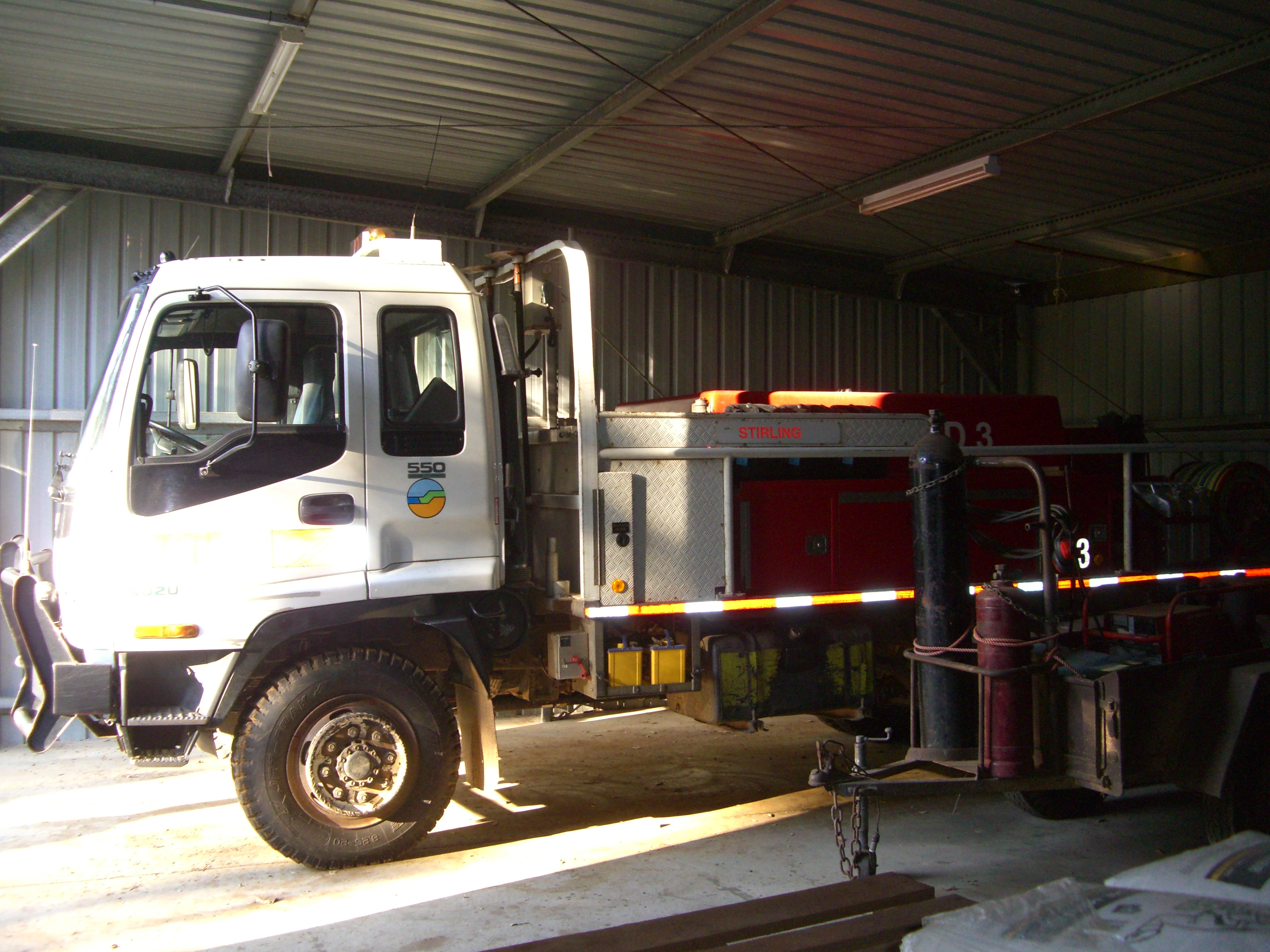
Heavy duty fire appliance Isuzu 550 (HD2 – Stirling Range) at Stirling Range National Park fire station, October 2005.

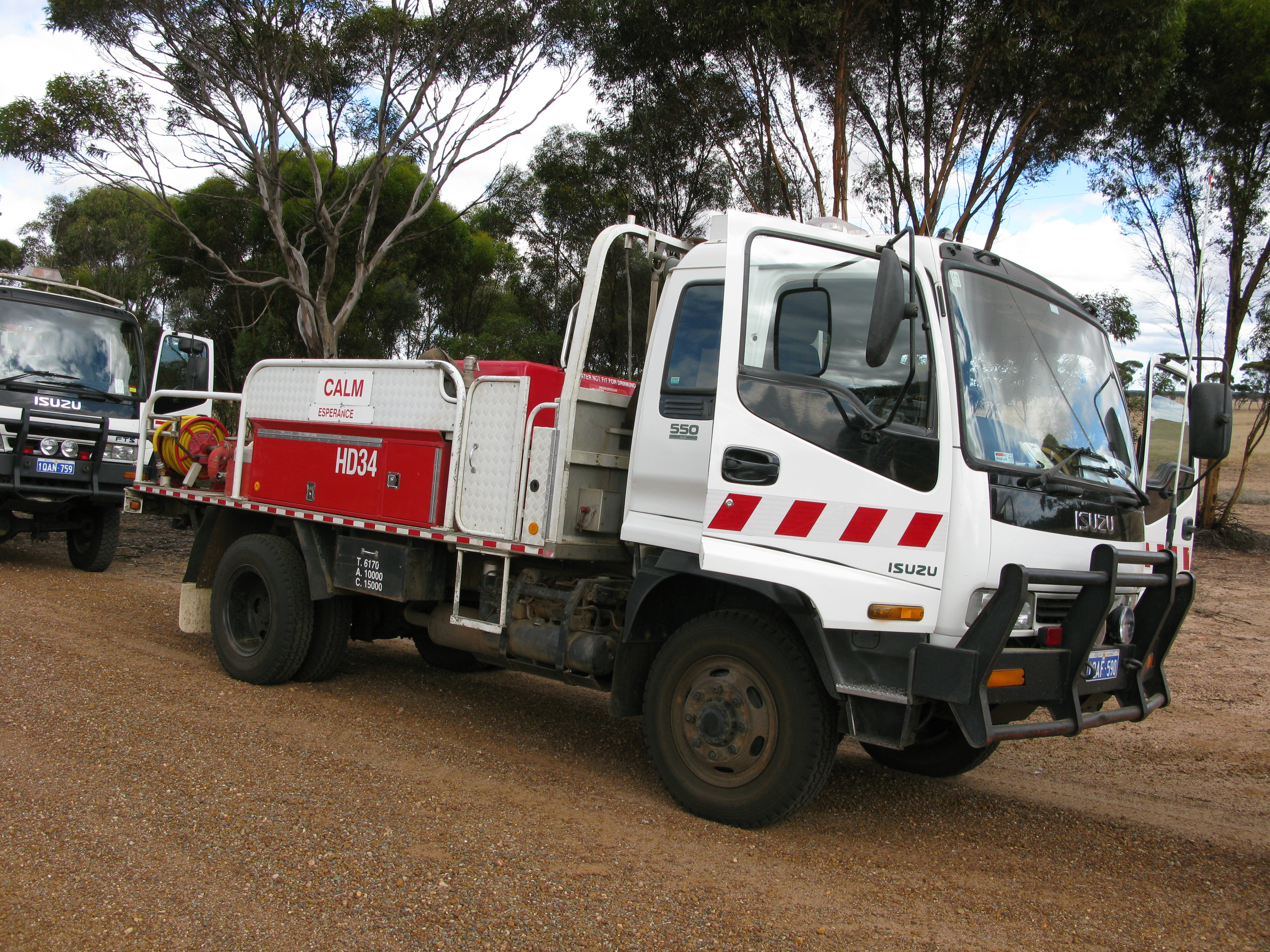
Heavy duty fire appliance Isuzu 550 (HD34 – Esperance) at a Salmon Gums wildfire, May 2006.

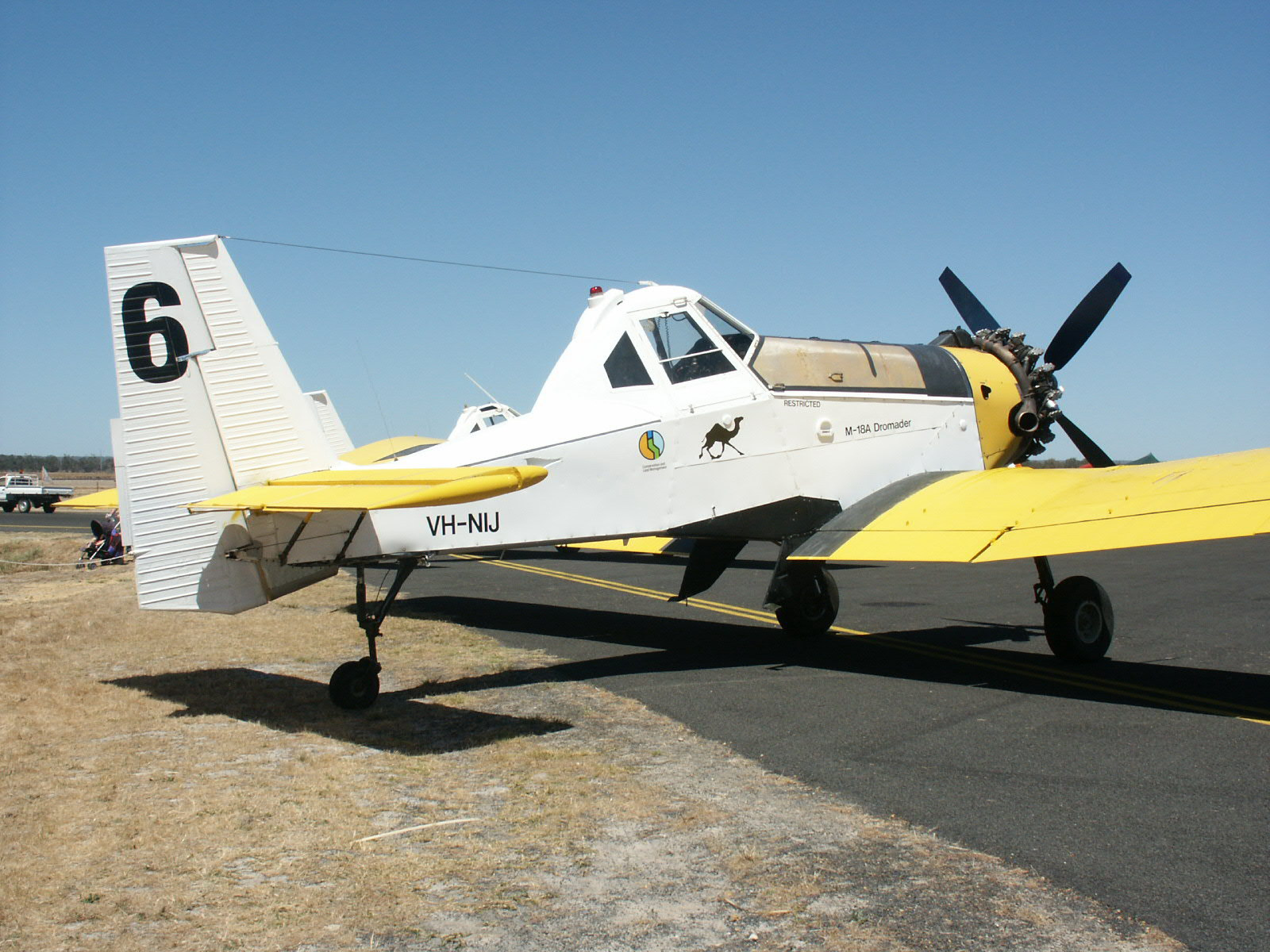
PZL-Mielec M-18 Dromader waterbomber, Busselton, Western Australia.

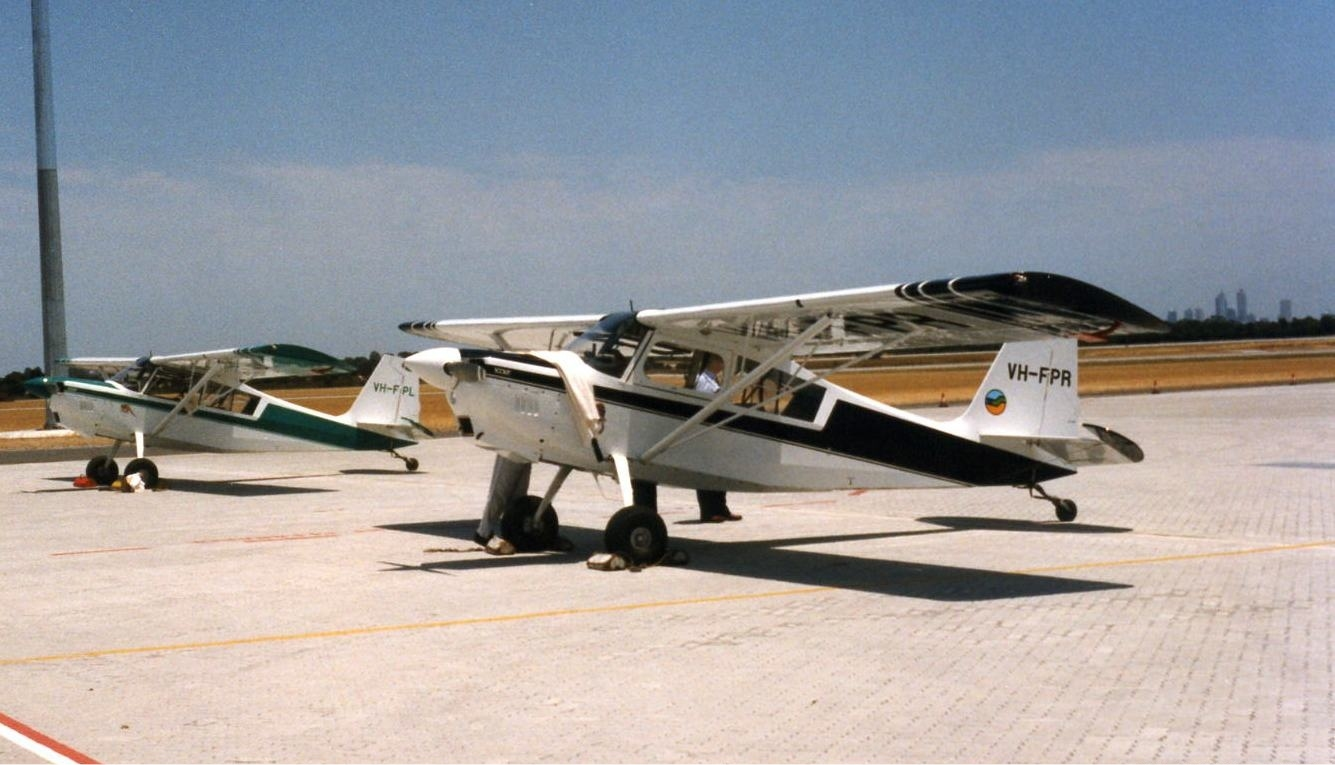
Champion aircraft scout 8GCBC at Perth Airport.

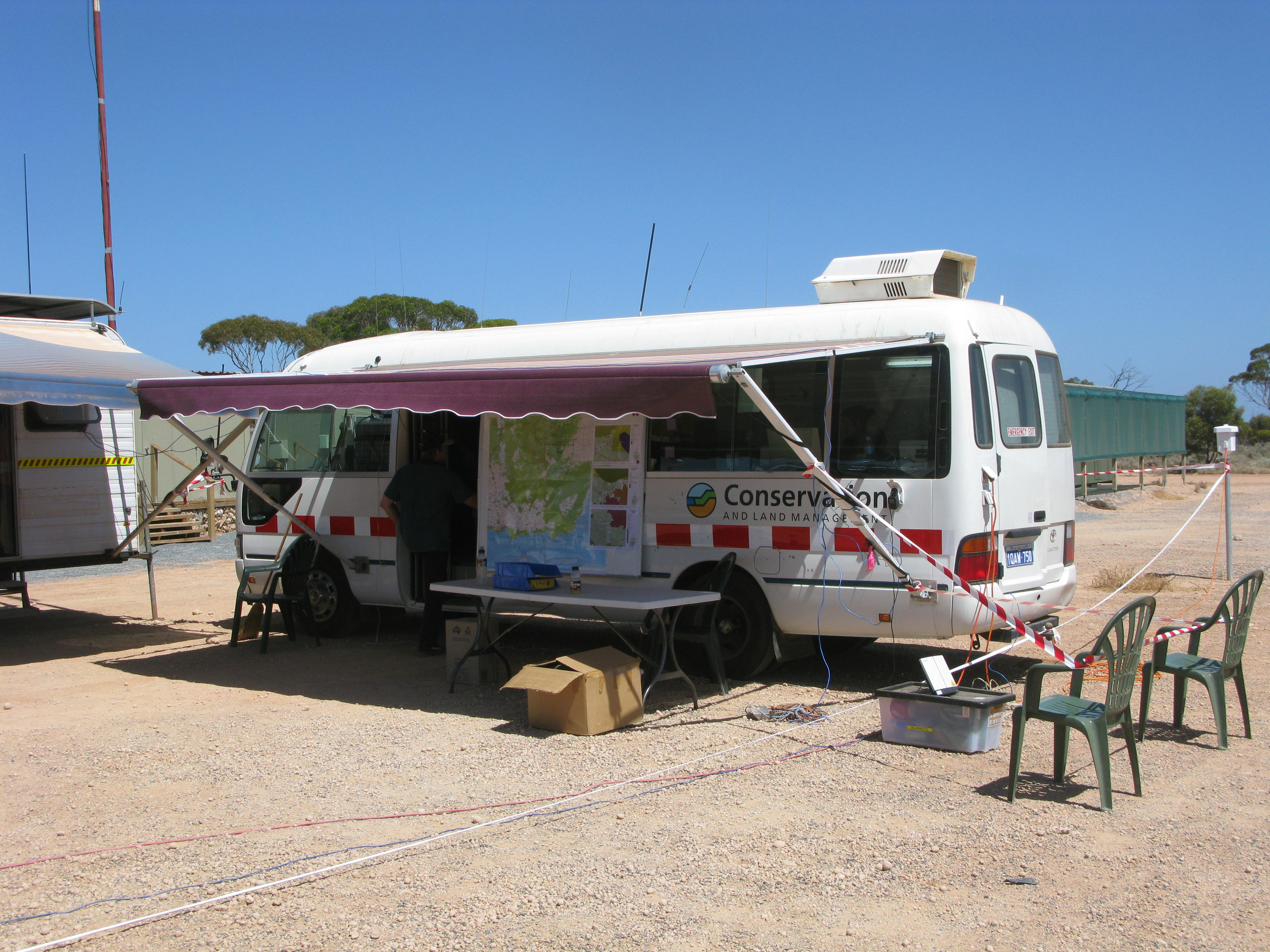
Toyota Coaster fire operations control van at Balladonia wildfire (Nullarbor plain), February 2003.

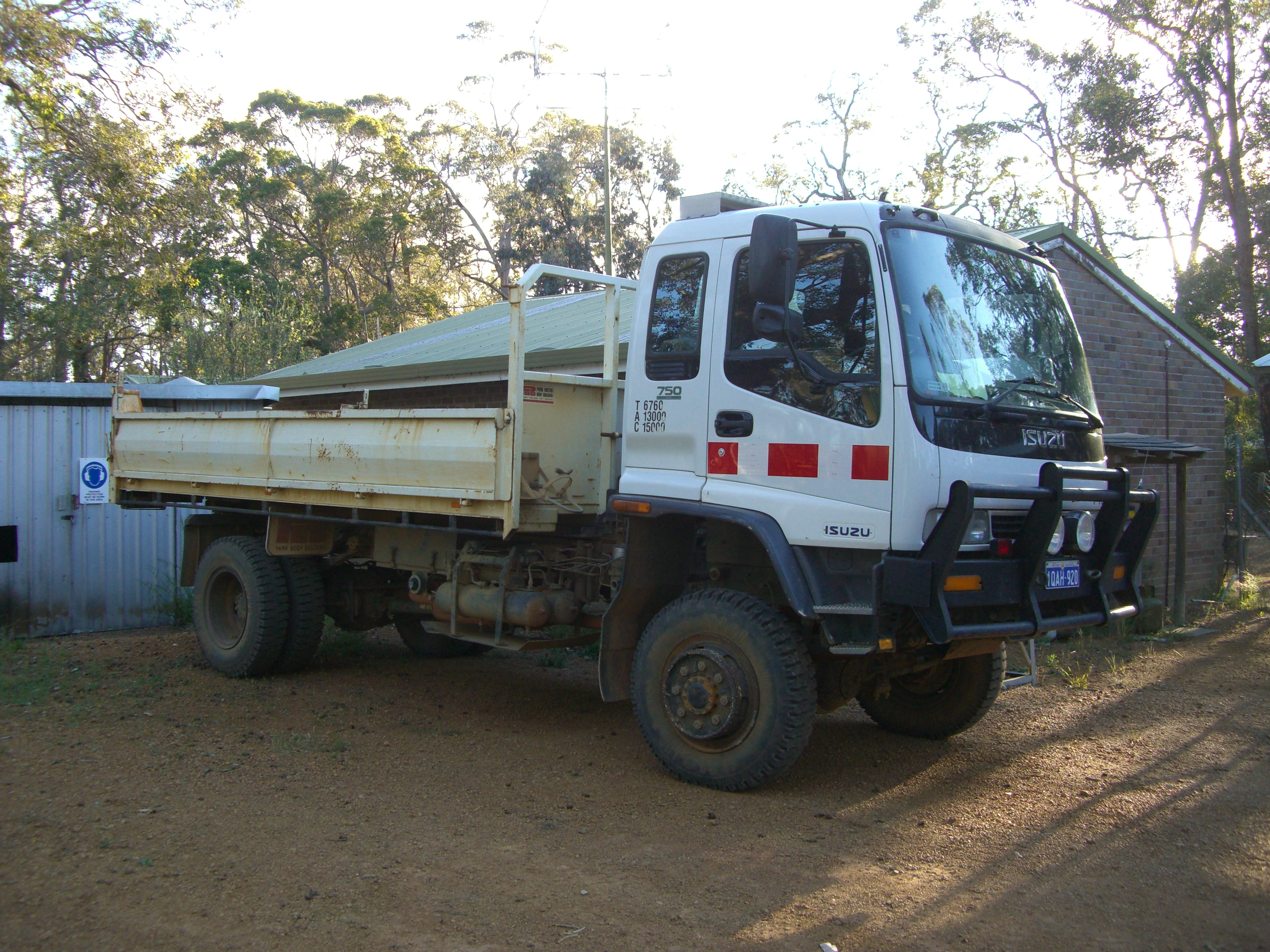
Tipper Isuzu 550 at Stirling Range National Park ranger station, October 2005.
