= Cyathochaeta equitans =

Scientific classification
- Kingdom: Plantae
- Clade: Tracheophytes
- Clade: Angiosperms
- Clade: Monocots
- Clade: Commelinids
- Order: Poales
- Family: Cyperaceae
- Genus: Cyathochaeta
- Species: C. equitans

Binomial name
- Cyathochaeta equitans K.L.Wilson

Species of grass-like plant

Cyathochaeta equitans is a sedge of the family Cyperaceae that is native to Australia.

The perennial sedge typically grows to a height of 0.6 to 1.2 metres (2.0 to 3.9 ft) with a tussock-like habit. The plant blooms between January and February producing brown flowers.

In Western Australia it is found mostly along the coast in the Wheatbelt, Peel, South West, Great Southern and Goldfields-Esperance regions where it grows in sandy soils.

It was first described in 1997 by Karen Wilson.
