= Forests Department (Western Australia) =

Former government department of Western Australia

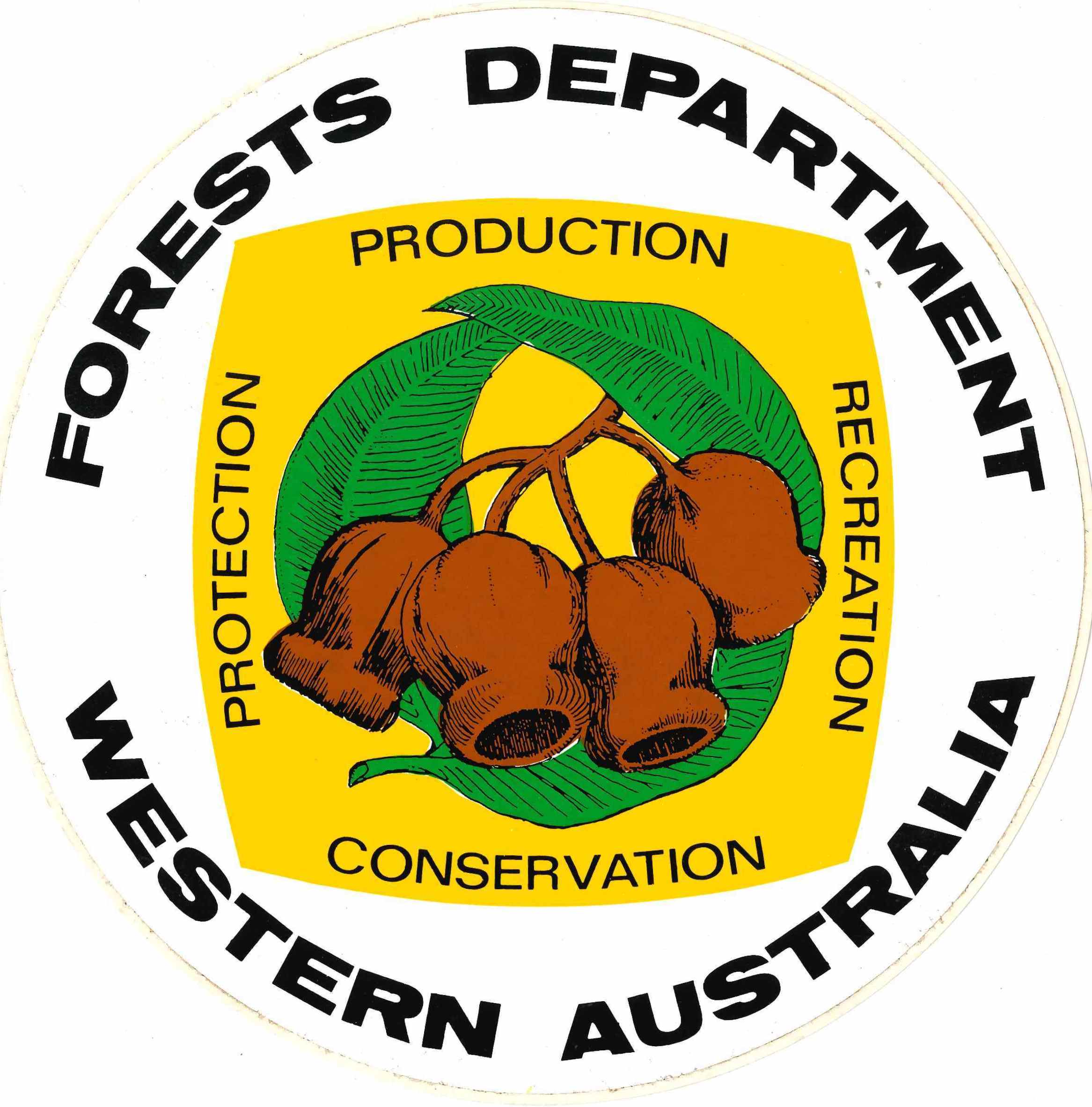
- Logo on Western Australian Forests Department's vehicles.

Agency overview
- Formed: 1 January 1919
- Preceding agencies: Department of Lands and Surveys; Wood and Forests Department
- Dissolved: 21 March 1985
- Jurisdiction: Government of Western Australia
- Agency executives: Charles Lane Poole, Conservator of forests; Mr P.J. McNamara, Acting Conservator of forests
- Child agency: Department of Conservation and Land Management

The Forests Department was a department of the Government of Western Australia created in 1919 under Conservator of Forests Charles Lane Poole, that was responsible for implementing the state's Forests Act 1918 legislation and regulations.

The Forests Department was incorporated all together with National Parks Authority and the Department of Fisheries and Wildlife on 21 March 1985 forming the Department of Conservation and Land Management.

== Status (at dissolution – 21 March 1985) ==
Forest policies covered by the Forests Department involved the following management objectives:

- Protect, control and rehabilitate forest areas that contribute to water supply requirements of the State,
- Native forests sustainable timber production:
  - Regeneration in 1984–85, karri 2 184 ha, wandoo 177 ha, tuart 70 ha (the jarrah forest regenerates naturally from lignotuberous seedlings present on the forest floor following logging),
  - Saw logs hardwood production in Crown Lands (1984–85): 564 688 m^{3},
  - Other logs hardwood production in Crown Lands (1984–85): 258 121 m^{3}.
- Ensure sufficient supplies of softwood to guarantee Western Australia's long-term self-sufficiency:
  - Area planted in 1984 with Pinus radiata: 1 996 ha, total area 31 431 ha,
  - Area planted in 1984 with Pinus pinaster and other species: 538 ha, total area 27 658 ha,
  - Saw logs softwood production in Crown Lands (1984–85): 39 550 m^{3},
  - Other logs softwood production in Crown Lands (1984–85): 116 857 m^{3}.
- Supply of minor forest produce as honey, sandalwood, wildflower seeds,
- Extend access and provide additional recreational facilities for people,
- Conserve the habitats of the many species of flora and fauna,
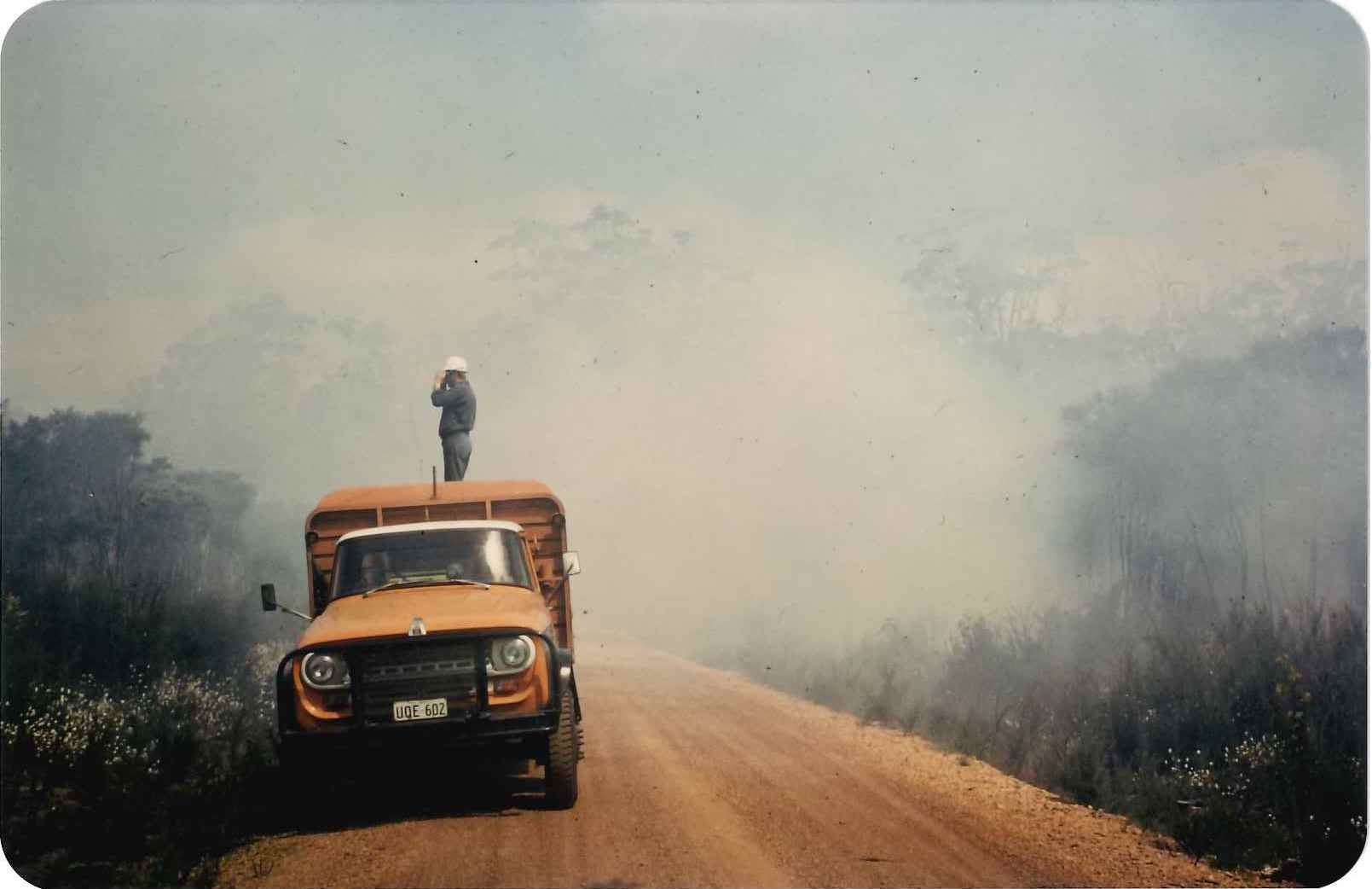
  East of Boorara 14 coupe burnt buffer in December 1980, Gardner SF, WA Forests Department.
- Set aside specific areas for education, reference and scientific study,
- Rehabilitate areas upon which the original vegetation has been destroyed by mining operations: reforestation in 1984–85: 376 ha,
- Maintain reserved forest and protect forest from fire, insects and other pathogens:
  - Area of prescribed burning in 1984–85: 270 000 ha,
  - Wildfire outbreaks in 1984–85: number 183, area burnt 3 889 ha were attended by forestry crews in or near State Forest,
  - Reforestation of disease-killed forest in 1984–85: 2 590 ha.
- Encourage private forestry.

The department had also several tree nurseries to help with these objectives in Hamel, Manjimup, Narrogin, Broome and Karratha for a total seedling production of 7 307 000 in 1985.

The Forests Department had management responsibilities in:

- 1 897 925 ha of State Forest,
- 119 116 ha of Timber Reserves,
- 25 460 ha of freehold land held in the name of the Conservator of Forests and
- 1 395 ha of land purchased for pine planting.

In 1978, just before the wildfire crisis due to Cyclone Alby, the Forests Department was at the peak of its development: "The department was 70 years old, had a long tradition in fire management and was led by professional officers with bushfire experience. There were several hundred staff located in Districts and Regional offices in the south-west [...]. The total forestry resources available for the suppression operations on the day of cyclone Alby was [...]: 15 professional officers, 106 field officers of various ranks from District Foresters to Forest Guards, all fire-trained, 40 clerical staff, who could fill roles in fire administration, 46 overseers, 350 members of fire crews, 41 mechanics, also all fire-trained, or able to play supporting roles in a fire, 16 professional officers in the Research or Inventory Branches, mostly fire-trained, 48 technical officers in Research or Inventory, all capable of filling roles in a fire situation."

Some of the most severe West Australian wildfires, in chronological order, that the department had to suppress:

Fire	Location	Area burned (1 ha ≈ 2.5 acres)	Date	Human fatalities	Livestock death/Properties damaged
1958 Easter block (Nannup) wildfire	Western Australia	Unknown	2 January 1958	4 FD firefighters (1 gang) working on foot.	
1961 Western Australian wildfires	Western Australia	1,800,000 ha	January – March 1961	0	160 homes, town of Dwellingup destroyed.
1963 Shannon River prescribed burning (Manjimup)	Western Australia	Unknown	8 January 1963	2 FD crews igniting	
1978 Western Australian wildfires	Western Australia	114,000 ha	4 April 1978	2	6 buildings (drop in wind in early evening is said to have saved the towns of Donnybrook, Boyup Brook, Manjimup, and Bridgetown.)

== Preceding agencies ==
Earlier forms of forest management in Western Australia were under:

- Department of Lands and Surveys: 1 January 1890 – (partly split) 31 December 1895
- Wood and Forests Department: 1 January 1896 – 31 December 1918

== Equipment ==
Around 1968, The Forests Department then was in full control of its destiny as mentioned by a former forester and General Manager of Department of Conservation and Land Management: "We were more akin to an old Army regiment, with our regimental headquarters in Perth and our divisional centres in the field, our long traditions and powerful culture. Back then, the Forests Department was largely independent of Treasury (our revenue came from royalties from timber cut on State Forest), we recruited and trained our own field staff, had our own gangs of forest workmen, purchased and maintained our own vehicles, fabricated our own fire equipment, made our own maps, had our own private telephone system which spanned the entire South West, and even had our own settlements, complete with streets of houses and blocks of single men's hut."

The department maintained and coordinated a range of specialist equipment and emergency response vehicles. This included pumpers and tankers and other equipment relating to operations involving fire spotting and firefighting.

In 1984–85, the Forests Department's fleet of 9 Piper Super Cub aircraft was flown for approximately 5 600 hours to provide aerial surveillance of the State Forest and nearby Crown Lands and private properties.

Four lookout towers were used to maintain a continuous watch on important pine plantations, whilst another 20 towers were maintained as a back-up to spotter aircraft.

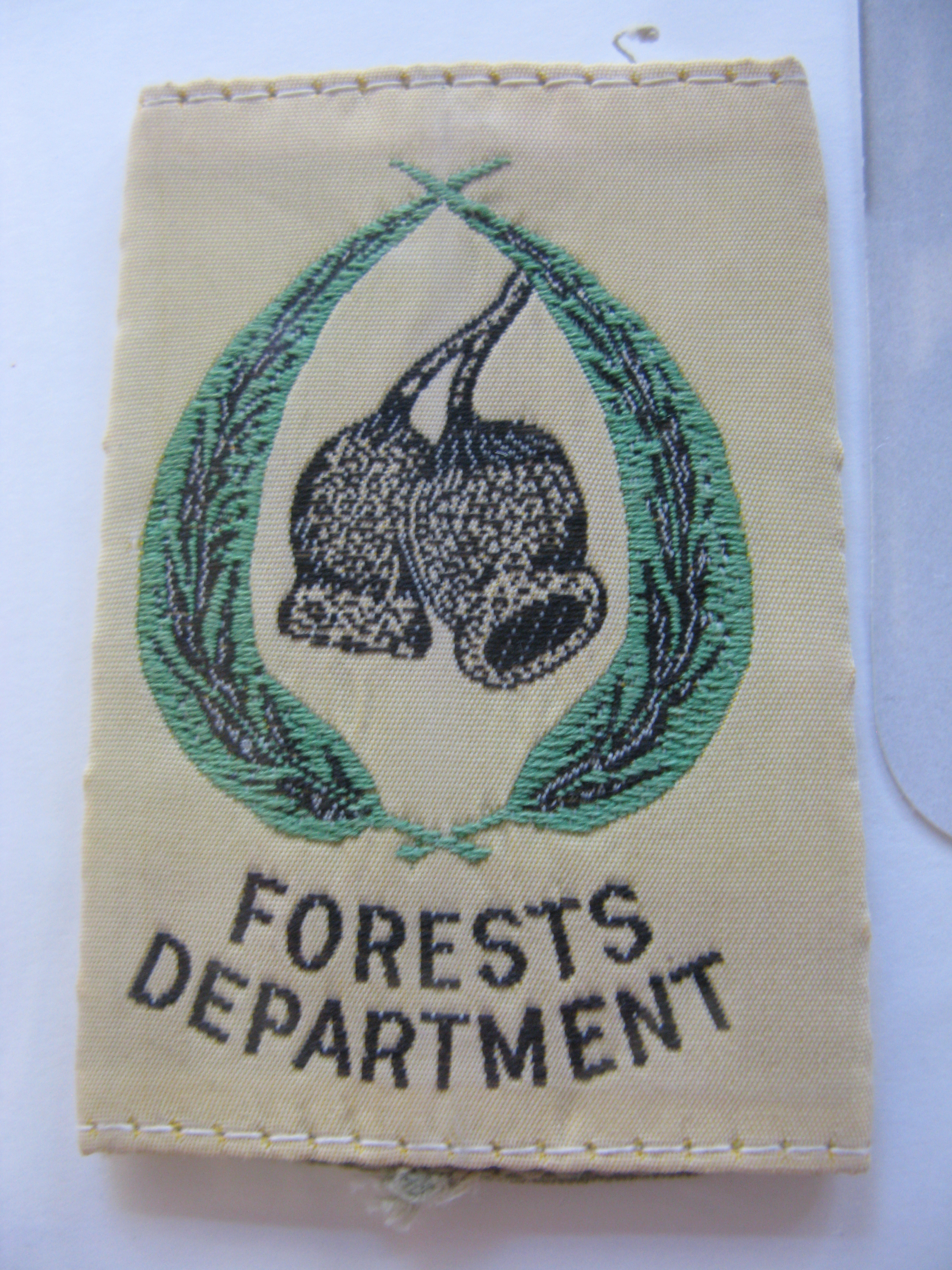
Forests Department epaulette for uniform.

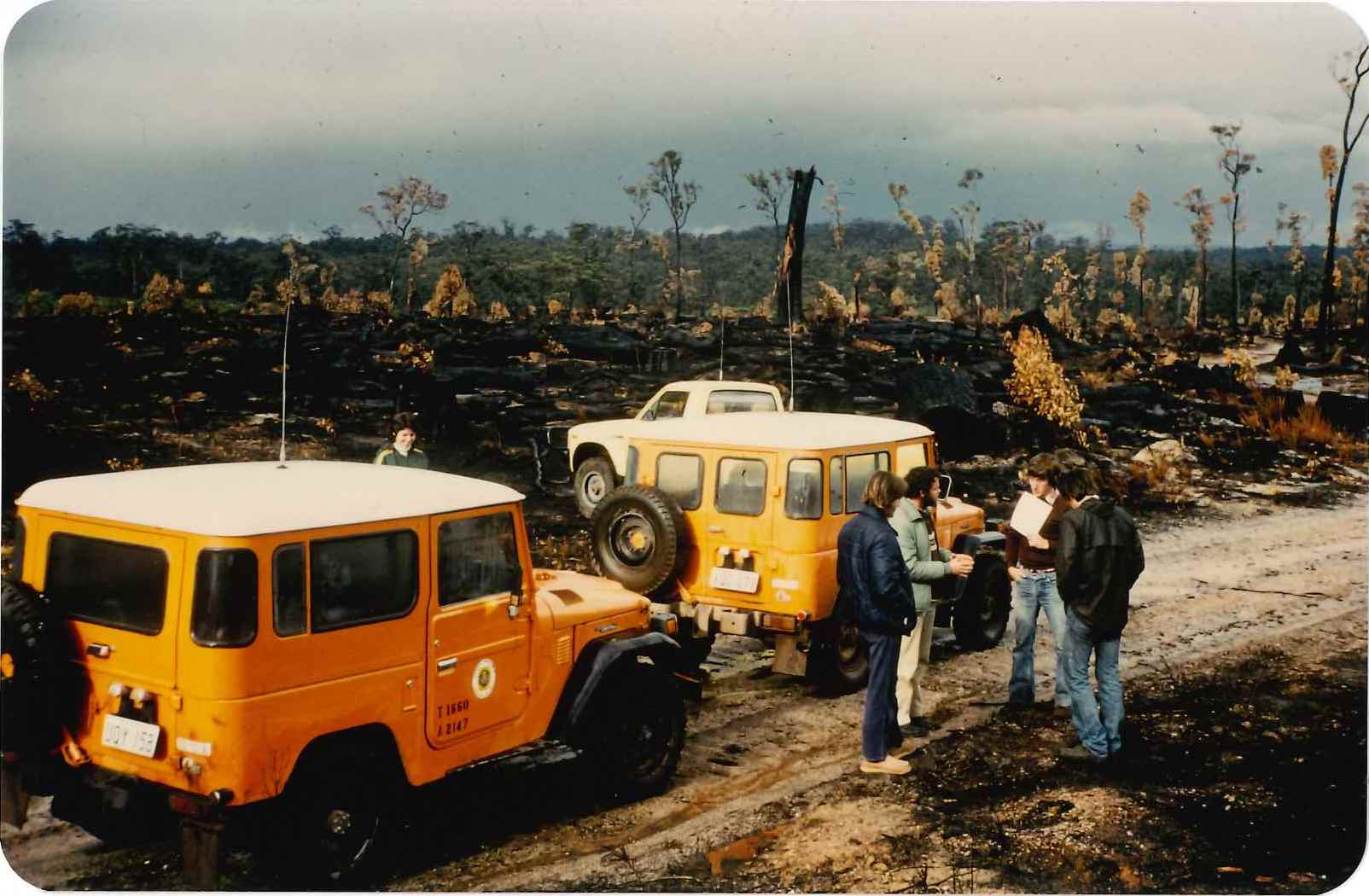
Flybrook 4 coupe after regeneration burn conducted April 1981, Donnelly State Forest, WA Forests Department.

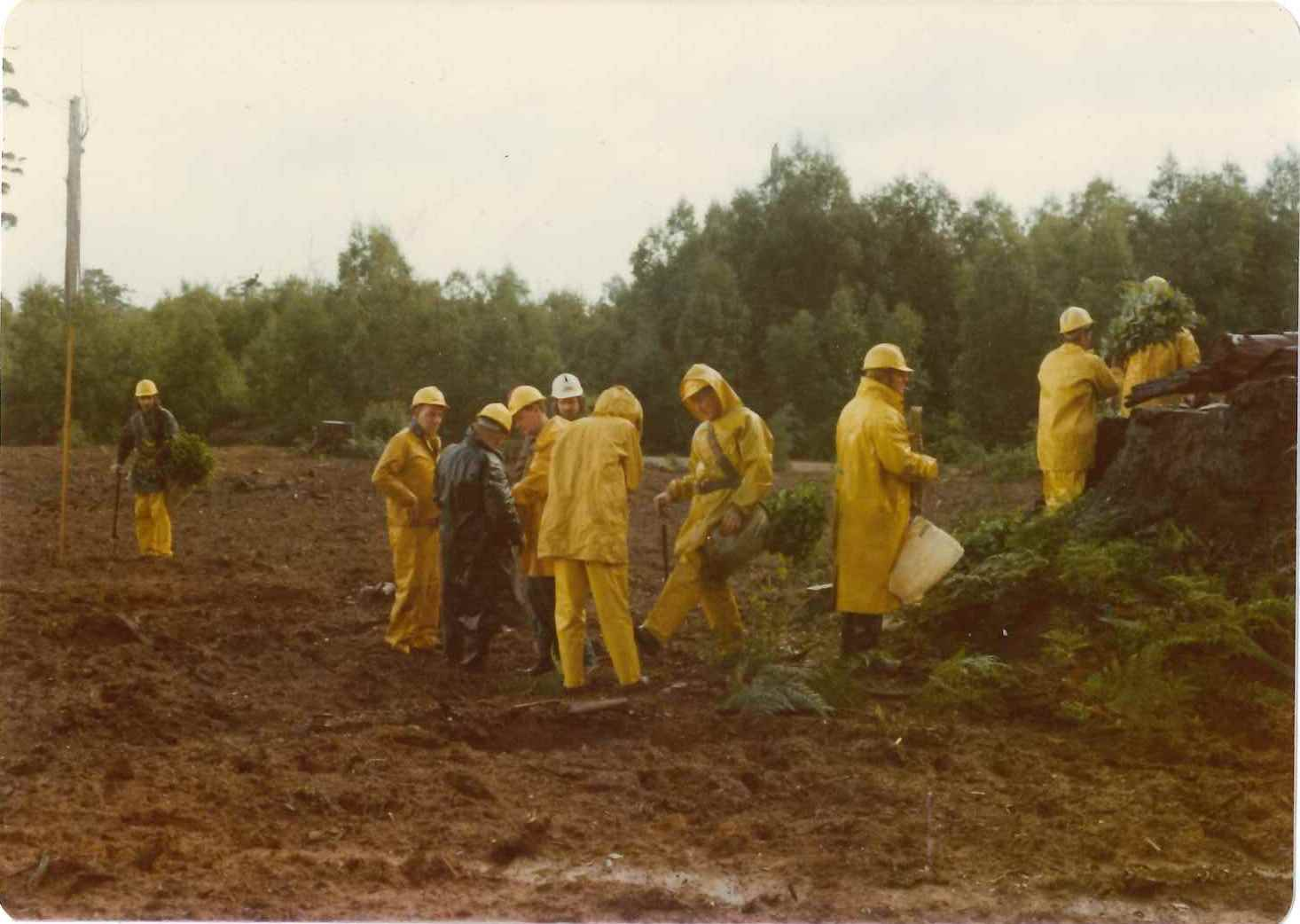
Pemberton planting gang at Boorara coupe 2, Gardner State Forest, WA Forests Department (1975).

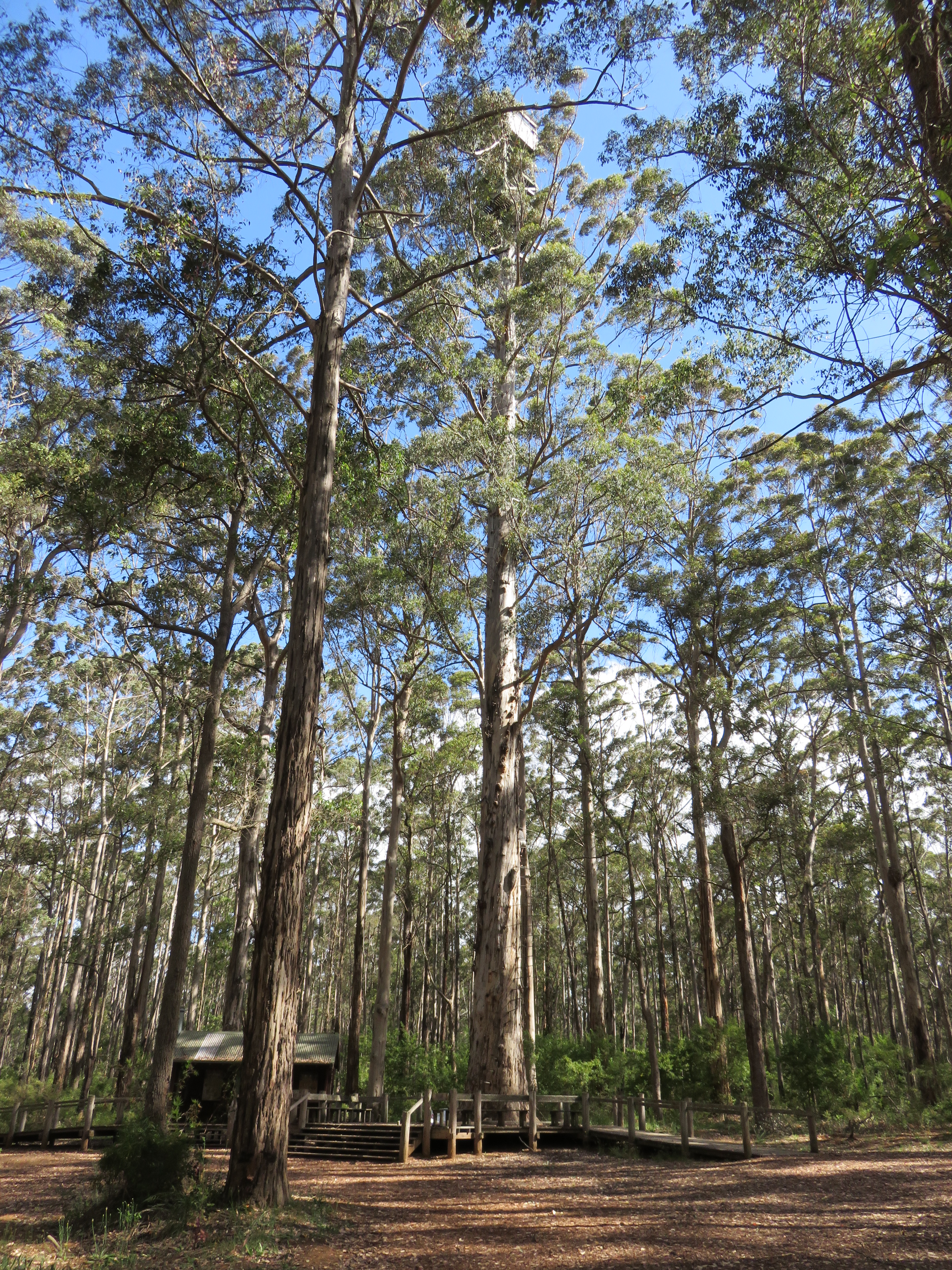
Diamond Tree Tower, Donnelly State Forest, November 2015.
