= Acacia gemina =

Scientific classification
- Kingdom: Plantae
- Clade: Tracheophytes
- Clade: Angiosperms
- Clade: Eudicots
- Clade: Rosids
- Order: Fabales
- Family: Fabaceae
- Subfamily: Caesalpinioideae
- Clade: Mimosoid clade
- Genus: Acacia
- Species: A. gemina

Binomial name
- Acacia gemina R.S.Cowan & Maslin
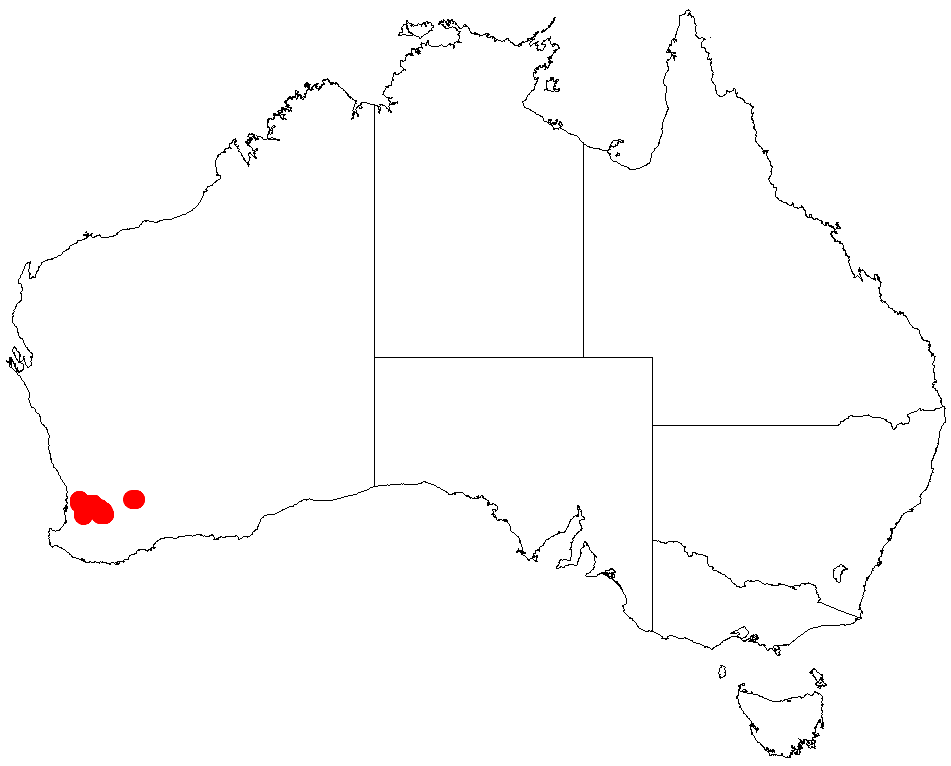
- Occurrence data from AVH

Synonyms
- Racosperma geminum (R.S.Cowan & Maslin) Pedley

Species of legume

Habit in Lupton Conservation Park, near North Bannister

Acacia gemina is a species of flowering plant in the family Fabaceae and is endemic to the south-west of Western Australia. It is an erect, spreading, much-branched shrub with branchlets covered with soft hairs, narrowly oblong or broadly elliptic, leathery phyllodes, spherical heads of golden yellow flowers and linear, strongly curved to coiled pods, raised over and slightly constricted between the seeds.

== Description ==
Acacia gemina is an erect, spreading, much-branched shrub that typically grows to a height of 0.4–1 m (1 ft 4 in – 3 ft 3 in) and has branchlets covered with soft hairs pressed against the surface. Its phyllodes are narrowly oblong or broadly elliptic, straight or curved, mostly 10–25 mm (0.39–0.98 in) long, 3–6 mm (0.12–0.24 in) wide and leathery with three prominent veins on both sides and a gland 1–3 mm (0.039–0.118 in) above the pulvinus. The flowers are borne in one or two spherical heads in axils, on peduncles 2–4 mm (0.079–0.157 in) long, each head 3–4 mm (0.12–0.16 in) in diameter with nine to eighteen golden yellow flowers. Flowering occurs from August to October, and the pods are linear, strongly curved to coiled, up to 50 mm (2.0 in) long, 2 mm (0.079 in) wide, firmly papery or thinly crusty, raised over and slightly constricted between the seeds. The seeds are egg-shapd, dull black with an aril near the end.

== Taxonomy ==
Acacia gemina was first formally described in 1999 by Richard Cowan and Bruce Maslin in the journal Nuytsia, from specimens collected 0.2 km (0.12 mi) south-east of Forty Hollow Road on Mount Saddleback in 1980. The specific epithet (gemina) means 'twin-born' or 'paired' and refers to its close affinity with its nearest relative, A. deflexa.

== Distribution and habitat ==
This species of wattle grows in lateritic gravel or deep sand in open heath or low woodland in the Boyagin Rock Nature Reserve, Saddlebask Timber Reserve, near Narrogin and Hyden, in the Avon Wheatbelt, Jarrah Forest and Mallee bioregions of south-western Western Australia.

== Conservation status ==
Acacia gemina is listed as 'Not threatened' by the Government of Western Australia Department of Biodiversity, Conservation and Attractions.

== See also ==
- List of Acacia species
