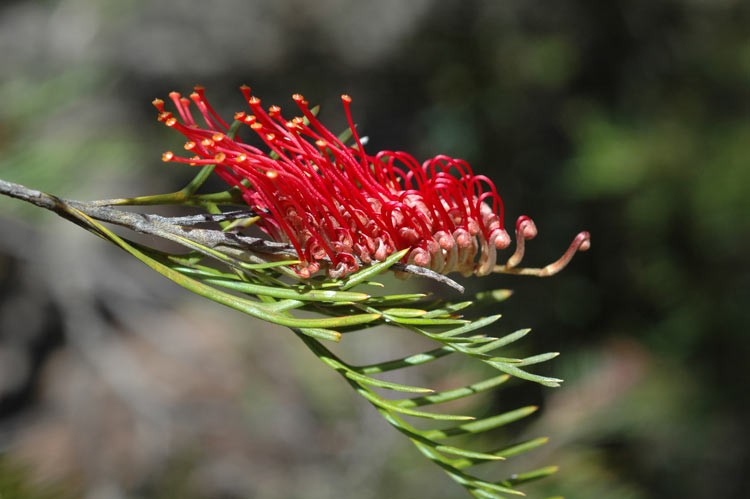
- In the Australian National Botanic Gardens

Conservation status
- Least Concern (IUCN 3.1)

Scientific classification
- Kingdom: Plantae
- Clade: Embryophytes
- Clade: Tracheophytes
- Clade: Angiosperms
- Clade: Eudicots
- Order: Proteales
- Family: Proteaceae
- Genus: Grevillea
- Species: G. hookeriana

Binomial name
- Grevillea hookeriana Meisn.

Subspecies
- Grevillea hookeriana Meisn. subsp. hookeriana; Grevillea hookeriana subsp. apiciloba (F.Muell.) Makinson; Grevillea hookeriana subsp. digitata (F.Muell.) Makinson

= Grevillea hookeriana =

Red toothbrushes

Species of shrub endemic to Western Australia

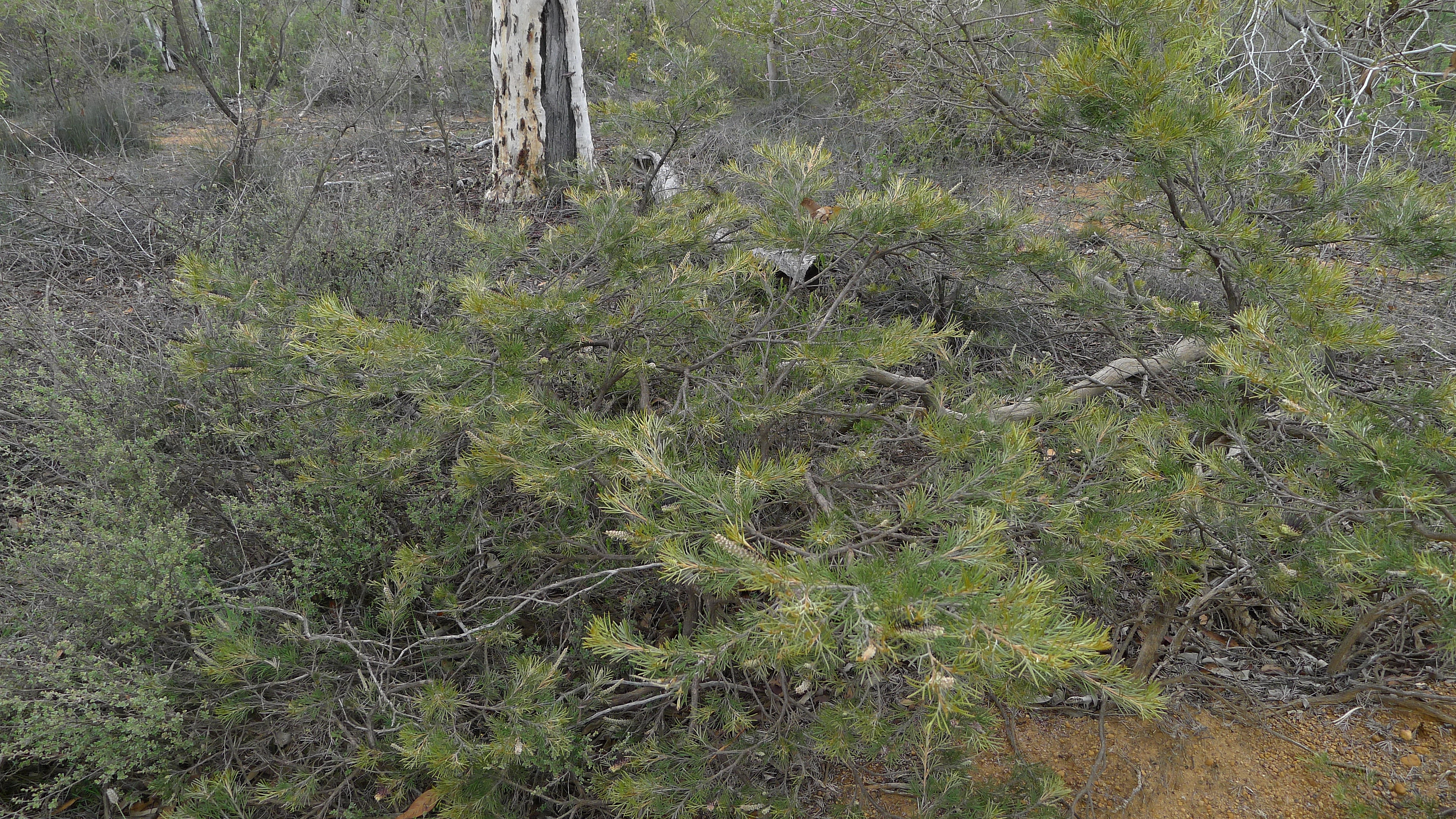
Habit in Boyagin Rock Nature Reserve

Grevillea hookeriana, commonly known as red toothbrushes or Hooker's grevillea, is a species of flowering plant in the family Proteaceae and is endemic to the south-west of Western Australia. It is a spreading to erect shrub, usually with linear leaves or deeply divided leaves with linear lobes, and toothbrush-shaped groups of red, black or yellowish green flowers, the style maroon to black.

== Description ==
Grevillea hookeriana is a spreading to erect shrub that typically grows to 0.5–2.5 m (1 ft 8 in – 8 ft 2 in) high and up to 4 m (13 ft) wide. Its leaves are 10–135 mm (0.39–5.31 in) long, sometimes linear and 0.6–2.6 mm (0.024–0.102 in) wide, or deeply divided with up to nine linear lobes 0.8–1.9 mm (0.031–0.075 in) wide. The linear leaves or lobes are sharply-pointed, the edges rolled under obscuring most of the lower surface. The flowers are arranged in toothbrush-shaped groups on a rachis 25–80 mm (0.98–3.15 in) long, and are silky- to shaggy-hairy, red, black or yellowish-green the pistil 18–21.5 mm (0.71–0.85 in) long. The fruit is a hairy follicle 12–18 mm (0.47–0.71 in) long.

== Taxonomy ==
Grevillea hookeriana was first formally described in 1845 by Carl Meissner in Johann Georg Christian Lehmann's Plantae Preissianae from specimens collected by James Drummond near the Swan River. The specific epithet (hookeriana) honours William Jackson Hooker, and probably also his son Joseph Dalton Hooker.

In 2000, Robert Owen Makinson described three subspecies of G. hookeriana in the Flora of Australia and the names are accepted by the Australian Plant Census:

- Grevillea hookeriana subsp. apiciloba (F.Muell.) Makinson is a spreading shrub 0.5–1.5 m (1 ft 8 in – 4 ft 11 in) tall with narrowly wedge-shaped leaves 35–100 mm (1.4–3.9 in) long with five to ten teeth 5–30 mm (0.20–1.18 in) long and 1–2 mm (0.039–0.079 in) wide, the flowers usually yellowish-green to greyish-fawn with a dull pink or dull reddish style, flowering mainly from July to October;
- Grevillea hookeriana subsp. digitata (F.Muell.) Makinson is a spreading shrub up to 2 m (6 ft 7 in) tall with narrowly wedge-shaped leaves 10–20 mm (0.39–0.79 in) long with five to nine teeth 3–6 mm (0.12–0.24 in) long and 1.2–1.6 mm (0.047–0.063 in) wide, the flowers usually yellowish-green to greyish-fawn with a purplish-black or dark maroon style with a green tip, flowering in most months with a peak from August to November;
- Grevillea hookeriana Meisn. subsp. hookeriana is a spreading shrub 1.5–2.5 m (4 ft 11 in – 8 ft 2 in) tall with linear leaves 35–135 mm (1.4–5.3 in) long and 1–2 mm (0.039–0.079 in) wide, or deeply divided with three to nine linear lobes 30–70 mm (1.2–2.8 in) long and 0.8–1 mm (0.031–0.039 in) wide, the flowers yellowish-green to greyish-fawn, pink or reddish with a purplish-black, dark maroon, red or yellow style with a green tip, flowering from May to November.

Subspecies hookeriana is variable, and four forms can be distinguished, with frequent intermediates.

== Distribution and habitat ==
Hooker's grevillea is widespread in the south-west of Western Australia, where it grows in heath or shrubland, mainly between Three Springs, Mount Churchman (near Karroun Hill Nature Reserve), Coolgardie and Katanning. Subspecies apiciloba is mostly found in the centre of the species' range, subsp. digitata in the north-west of the species' range and subsp. hookeriana in the area between Coorow, Katanning, Newdegate and Merredin.

== Conservation status ==
Grevillea hookeriana is listed as least concern on the IUCN Red List of Threatened Species. All three subspecies are listed as not threatened by the Government of Western Australia Department of Biodiversity, Conservation and Attractions.

This species has a widespread distribution where it is locally common, and the species' population as a whole is generally stable. Although land clearing for agriculture has reduced much of its distribution, it occurs within multiple protected areas and large areas of its range remain unaffected by land clearing.

== Use in horticulture ==
A cultivar known as G. 'Red Hooks' (often erroneously referred to as G. hookeriana or G. hookerana) has been in cultivation for many years. It is a hybrid of G. hookeriana and G. tetragonoloba. G. hookeriana is comparatively rare in cultivation, and less vigorous than the cultivar. It is best suited to a climate where the summers are dry. It requires good drainage and prefers a sunny or partially shaded position and has moderate frost resistance. Propagation is from semi-mature cuttings or seed.

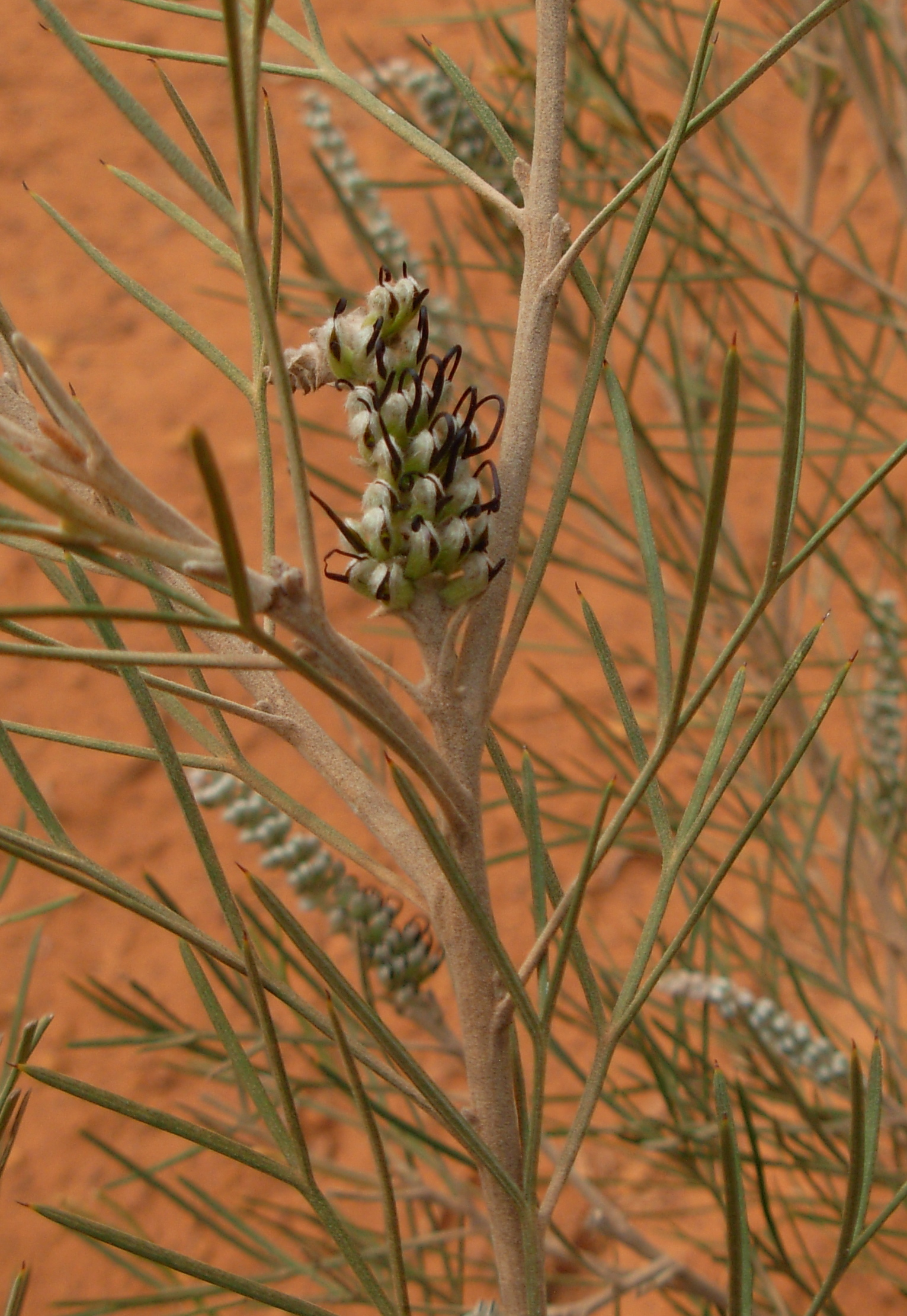
Black form near Goomalling

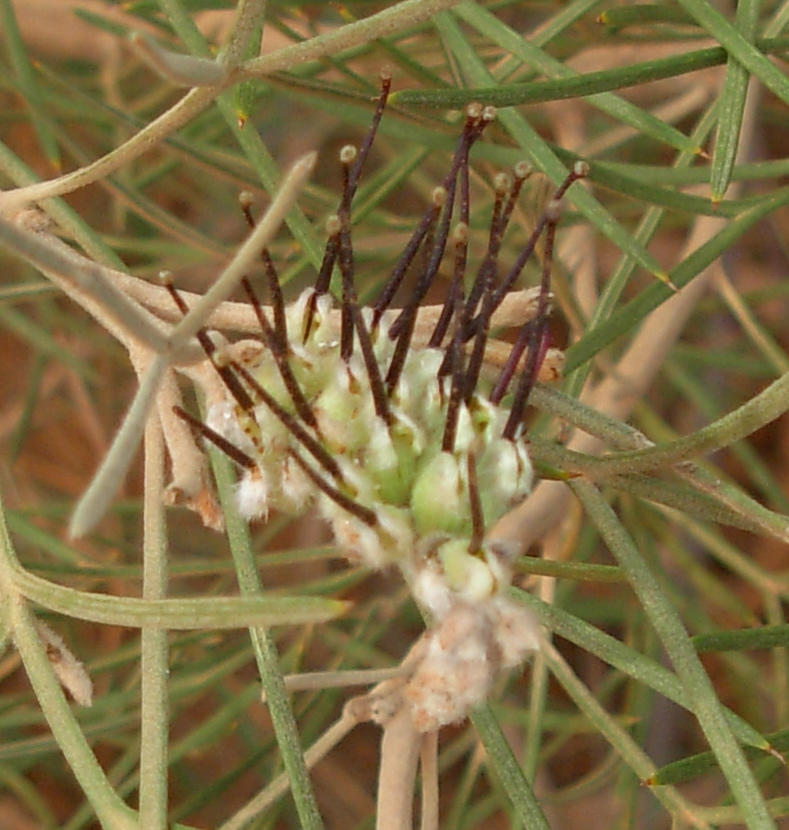
Black form, flower detail near Northam

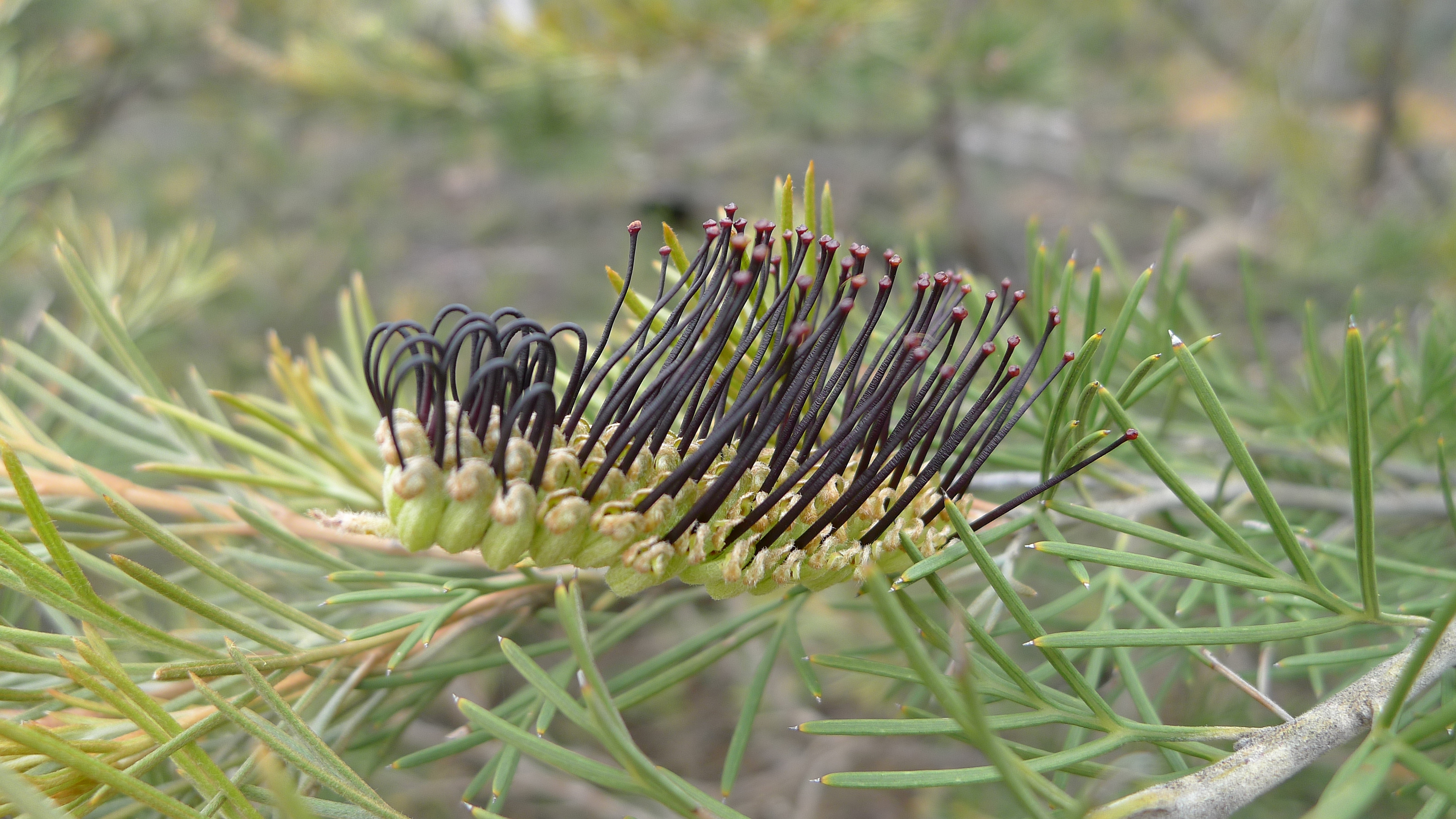
Black form in Boyagin Rock Nature Reserve

== See also ==
- List of Grevillea species
