= Dryandra Woodland National Park =

National park in Western Australia

- Noongar: Wilgadjny
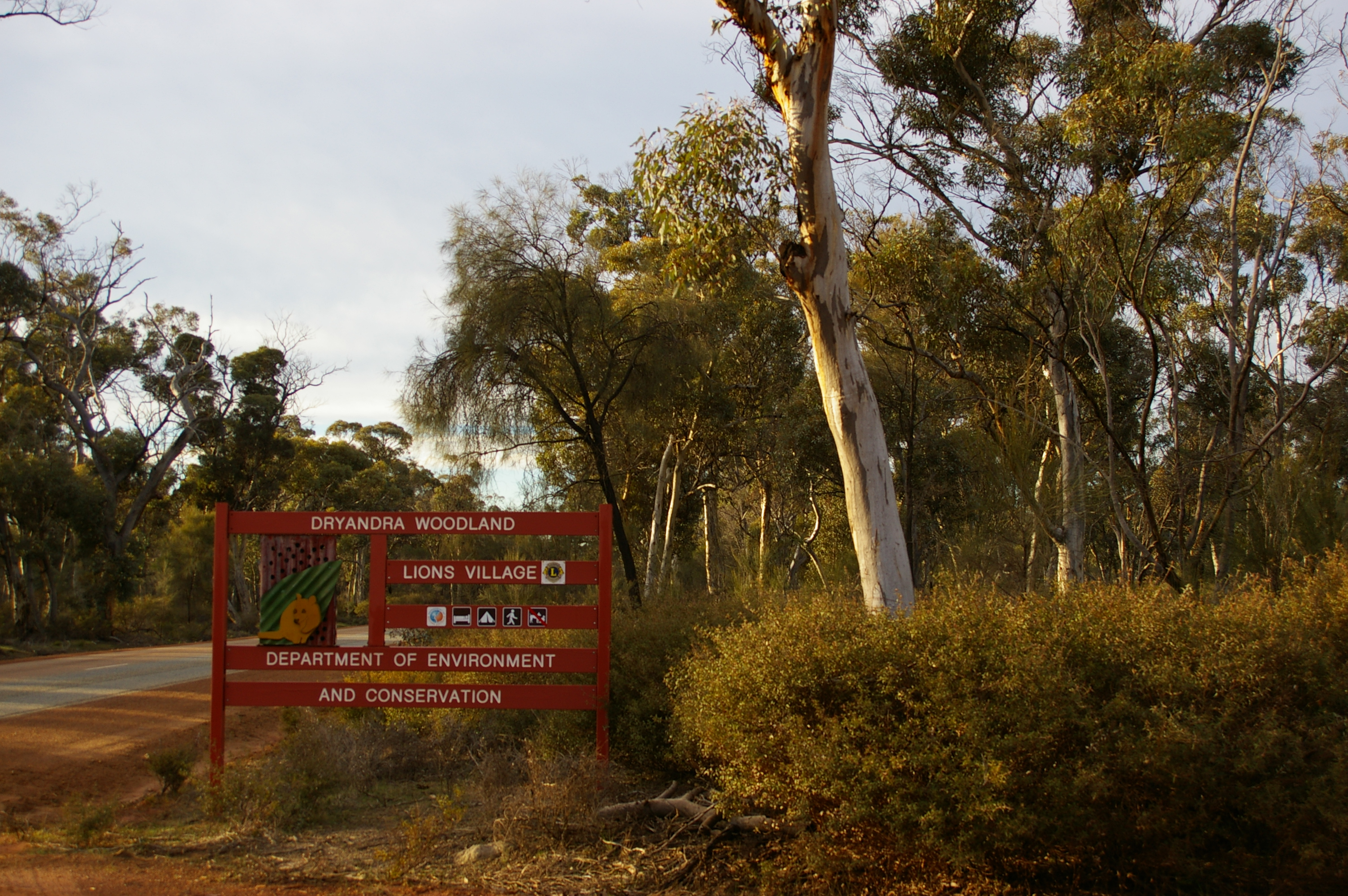
- Entrance to Dryandra Woodland on the Narrogin-Wandering road

- Location within Western Australia
- Dryandra Woodland National Park (●) is situated approximately 164 kilometres (102 miles) south-east of Perth in Western Australia.
- Location: Wheatbelt, Western Australia
- Coordinates: 32°47′00″S 116°58′01″E
- Area: 280.66 km^{2} (108.36 sq mi)
- Established: 1976 (Nature reserve); 2022 (National park)
- Named for: Banksia ser. Dryandra
- Website: parks.dpaw.wa.gov.au/park/dryandra-woodland-national-park

Register of the National Estate
- Official name: Dryandra Woodland
- Type: Natural
- Designated: 21 March 1978
- Reference no.: 9928
- Place File Number: 5/06/094/0001

The Dryandra Woodland National Park is a national park in Western Australia within the shires of Cuballing, Williams and Wandering, about 164 kilometres (102 miles) south-east of Perth and 22 kilometres (14 miles) north-west of the town of Narrogin. It is a complex of 17 distinct blocks managed by the Western Australian Department of Biodiversity, Conservation and Attractions and spread over approximately 50 kilometres (31 miles) separated by areas of agricultural land. The area is considered to be one of the state's major conservation areas, and although it is far from pristine due to its history of logging operations, a number of species of threatened fauna are rebuilding populations through the removal of introduced predators such as foxes and feral cats.

The combined area of the woodland is 28,066 hectares (108.36 square miles), with individual blocks ranging in size from 87 hectares (0.34 square miles) to 12,283 hectares (47.42 square miles). Part of Dryandra Woodland is listed on the Register of the National Estate by the Australian Heritage Council.

In addition to the area's use as a wildlife refuge, it has anthropological significance with the Indigenous Noongar people having strong cultural links there.

Dryandra Woodland was declared a national park on 17 January 2022.

== Description ==
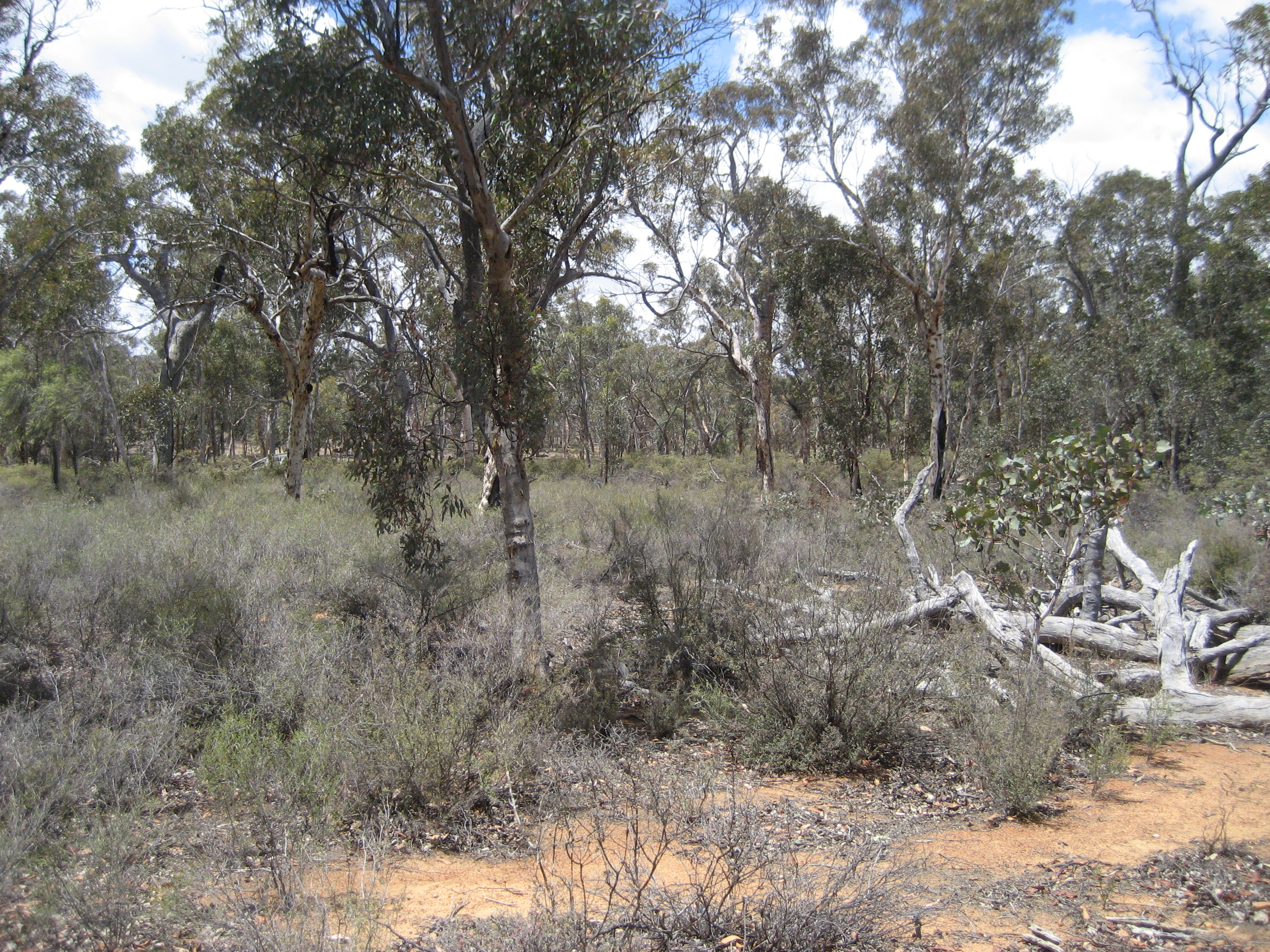
Typical heath in non-replanted areas of Dryandra Woodland

Dryandra Woodland logo

The Dryandra Woodland is found within the south-western province of the Yilgarn craton, "an ancient plateau composed mainly of granite, with intrusions of dolerite and capped with laterite. Past weathering of the plateau in the Dryandra area has produced a gently undulating countryside".

The woodland lies close to the boundary between the Mallee and Avon Wheatbelt biogeographic regions of the Southwest Botanical Province. It is situated on the western edge of the state's Wheatbelt region; the area is a rare remnant of the open eucalypt woodlands that covered much of the wheatbelt prior to the land clearing that started from the 1890s. Dryandra's flora is transitional between that of the moister jarrah forest (generally to the south) and the semi-arid wheatbelt (to the east). It is known particularly for its extensive stands of wandoo (Eucalyptus wandoo), powderbark wandoo (E. accedens) and salmon white gum (E. lane-poolei), and provides a haven for native flora and fauna while much of the surrounding country is badly affected by salinity. Stands of jarrah (E. marginata) and marri (Corymbia calophylla) provide additional top cover, and the understorey contains rock sheoak (Allocasuarina huegeliana) and extensive areas of Banksia ser. Dryandra. Until early 2007 this latter shrub was classified as a separate genus Dryandra, after which the woodland is named. Species include golden dryandra (Banksia nobilis) and prickly dryandra (B. armata). An arboretum on Tomingley Road holds a range of Australian native plants.

Dryandra Woodland and surrounding townships in the south-west of Western Australia

The 17 lots are surrounded by a largely cleared and agricultural landscape. In some cases, road reserves and other linking corridors of uncleared vegetation remain between the woodland islands. Some neighbouring landowners have revegetated areas of previously cleared private land to form additional corridors between these remnants. For certain animals, movement between blocks is necessary on a daily, seasonal or intermittent basis, to provide access to food, shelter, breeding sites and partners.

Threatened fauna receive extra protection within the Barna Mia animal sanctuary, which is open to visitors by appointment for nocturnal tours on alternate evenings. Native marsupial fauna include the woylie (Bettongia penicillata), bilby (Macrotis lagotis), mala (Lagorchestes hirsutus), boodie (Bettongia lesueur), and marl (western barred bandicoot: Perameles bougainville). The quenda (southern brown bandicoot: Isoodon obesulus) is locally extinct but may be reintroduced.

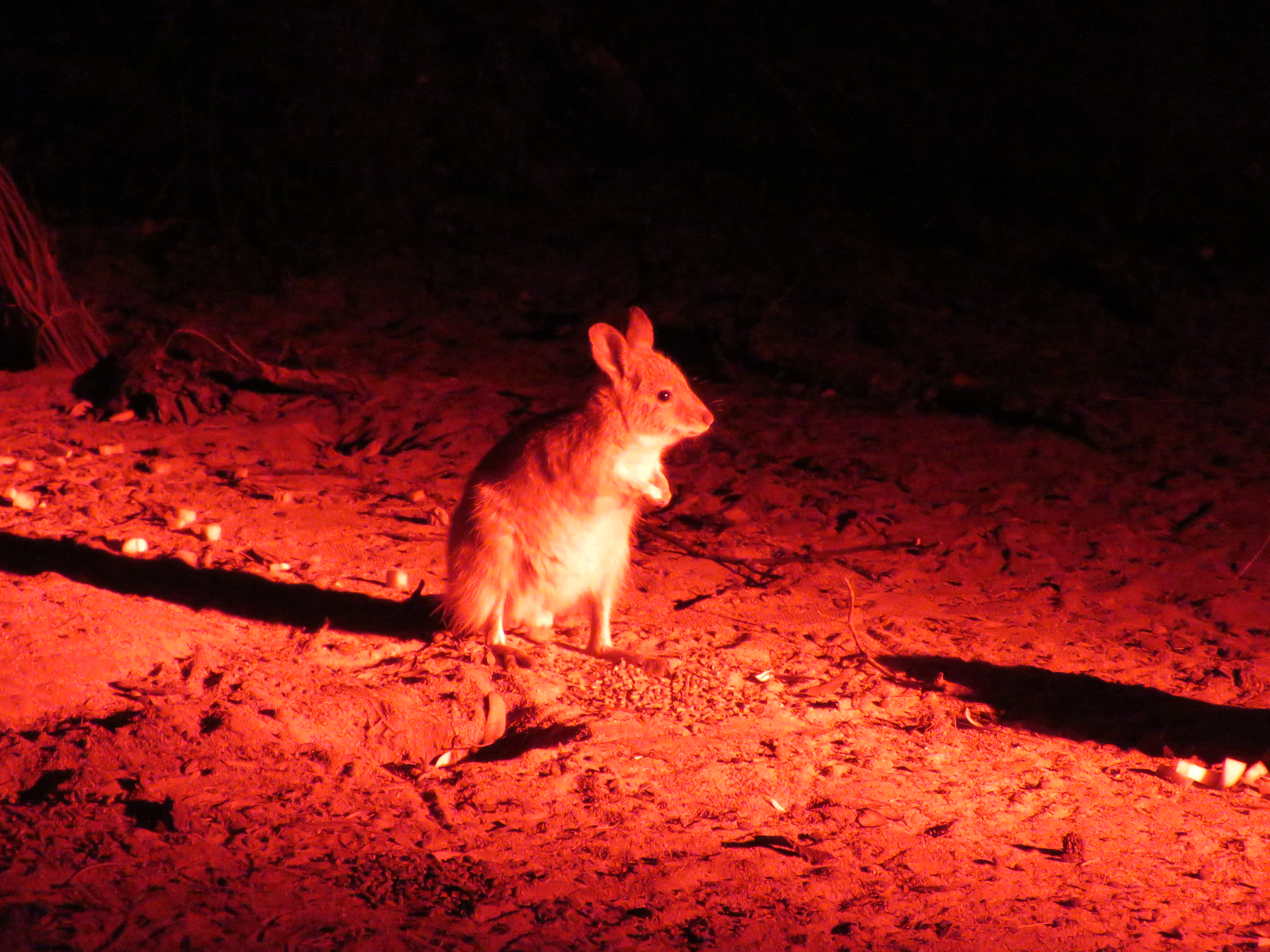
A rufous hare-wallaby, extinct in the wild on mainland Australia, at Barna Mia

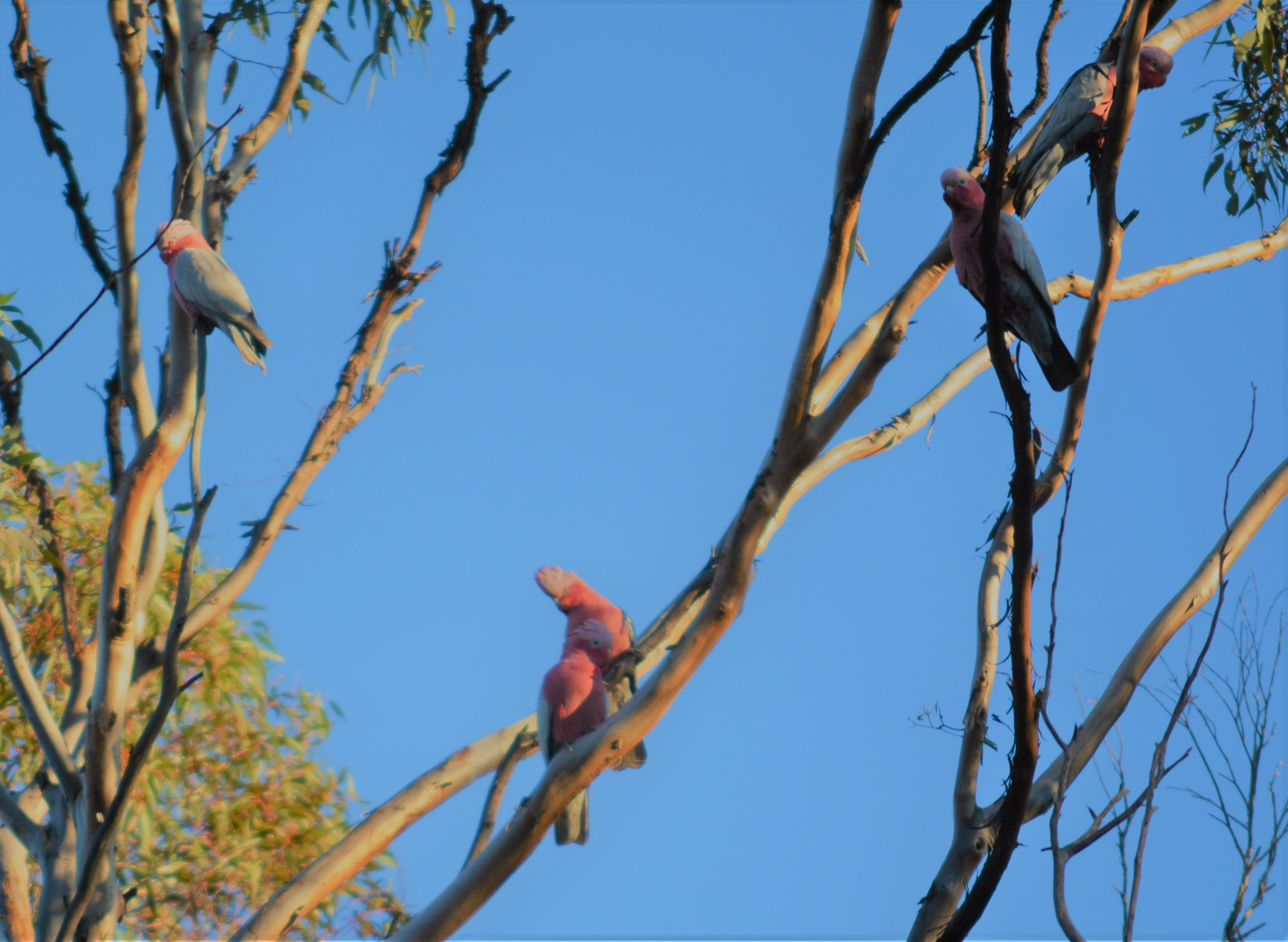
Galahs, Dryandra Woodland

The woodland's position on the transition zone between the wheatbelt and the jarrah forest determines amphibian populations, with several species existing at the eastern or western limits of their range. Herpetofauna includes the western marsh frog (golden flecked burrowing frog, Heleioporus barycragus), which is generally restricted to the western Darling Range. There are at least 98 species of bird in the woodland, including the almost flightless malleefowl (Leipoa ocellata).

Climatically, Dryandra is described as semi-arid, with a warm, dry, Mediterranean climate. It has seven to eight dry months each year with an annual average rainfall of about 500 millimetres (20 in). Seasonal changes in temperature, rainfall and wind direction are marked and more extreme than coastal areas of the south-west.

== Role in fauna and flora protection ==
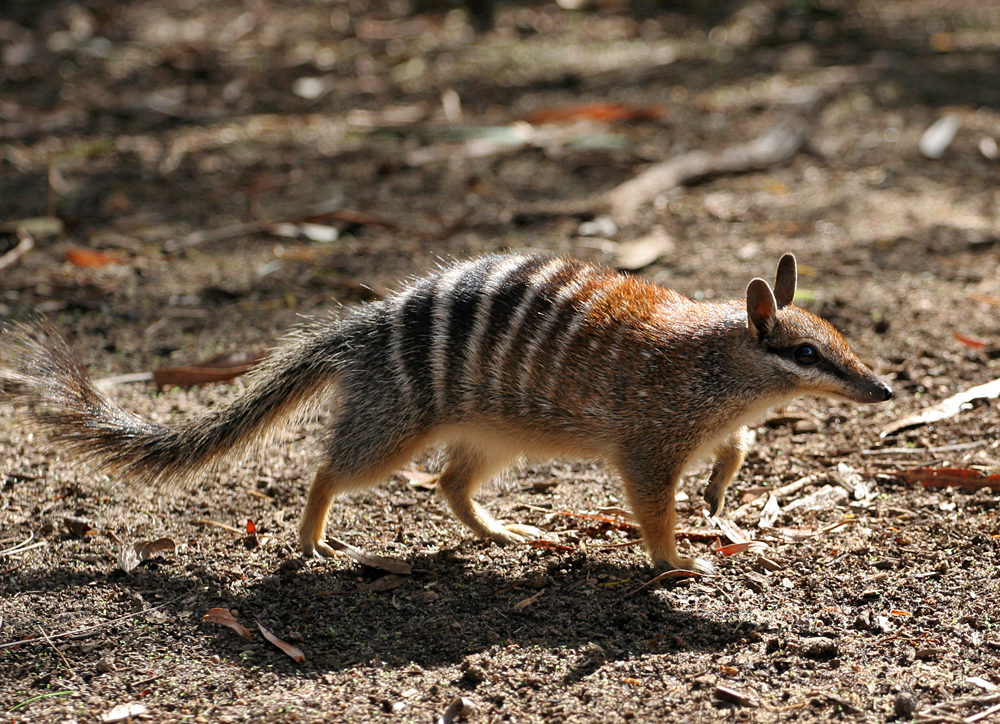
Numbat (Myrmecobius fasciatus)

The following fauna are known to be living in the woodland and have a conservation status of "threatened" as recorded in the IUCN Red List:

Common name	Scientific name	Category
Brush-tailed bettong (also known as woylie)	Bettongia penicillata	Critically endangered
Red-tailed phascogale	Phascogale calura	Near threatened
Short-billed black-cockatoo (also known as Carnaby's black cockatoo)	Calyptorhynchus latirostris	Endangered
Numbat	Myrmecobius fasciatus	Vulnerable
Chuditch (also known as western quoll)	Dasyurus geoffroii	Near threatened
Malleefowl	Leipoa ocellata	Vulnerable

Major populations of three nationally endangered species exist in the woodlands: the woylie, the red tailed phascogale, and over 50 percent of the total known population of numbat.

After measures aimed at excluding feral cats, the population of numbats in the Dryandra Woodland had increased to 35 by November 2020, after recording just 10 in 2019 and 5 in 2018. There had not been so many numbats recorded since 36 were recorded in the 1990s.

Over 800 native flora have been identified within the Dryandra Woodland, including 15 that have been declared priority species under the Department of Environment and Conservation's Declared Rare and Priority Flora List. The conservation codes of P2 thru P4 are for flora that are considered rare but have some populations in areas where they are thought not be under immediate threat; higher numbers denote a lower threat level.

Scientific name	Conservation priority code
Grevillea crowleyae	P2
Amanita carneiphylla	P2
Andersonia bifida	P2
Marianthus dryandra	P2
Chamelaucium croxfordiae ms	P2
Banksia acanthopoda	P2
Persoonia hakeiformis	P2
Schoenus aff. clandestinus	P2
Triglochin stowardii	P3
Acacia brachyphylla var. recurvata	P3
Acacia deflexa	P3
Acacia semitrullata	P3
Thysanotus tenuis	P3
Banksia cynaroides	P4
Gastrolobium tomentosum (woolly poison)	P4

== Mallet ==
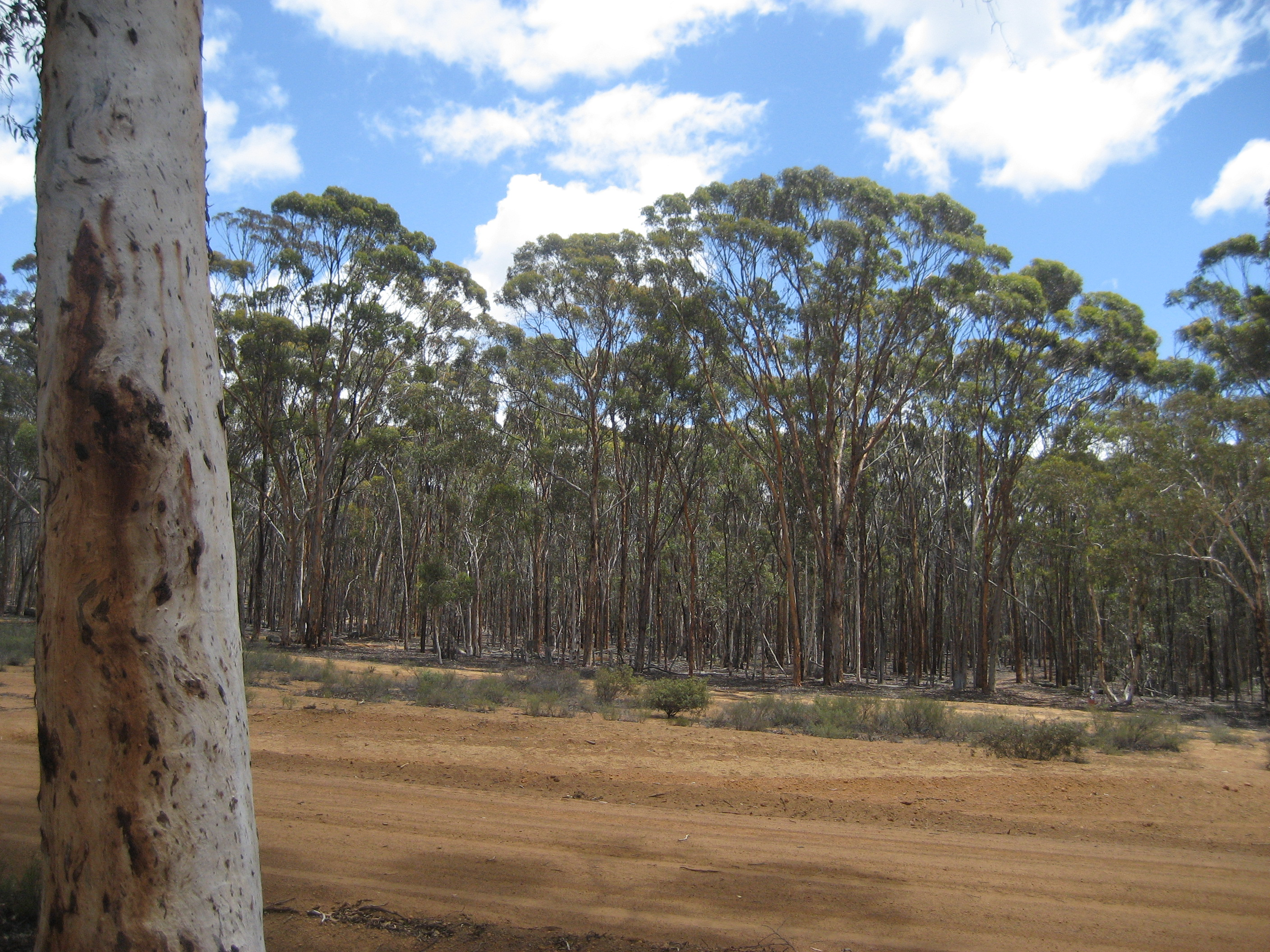
Mallet plantation

In the early 1900s a significant industry established within the forest and surrounding region harvesting bark from brown mallet trees (Eucalyptus astringens), a species of eucalypt which grows on and near laterite soils in parts of the southern wheatbelt. Bark sent to Germany for analysis was found to contain more than 40% of high quality, water-soluble tannins suitable for the production of quality leather by the process of tanning.

By the mid-1920s, concerns were being raised about the ability of the area to maintain the supply of naturally grown mallet and by 1929, stands of the naturally grown mallet had almost disappeared. So, between 1925 and 1962 mallet plantations were established under the management of the Forests Department which, during the Depression, provided employment for sustenance workers who planted some 4,000 hectares (9,900 acres) of mallet, starting near Lol Gray lookout. In 1933, 50 forestry workers were employed in the plantations. Seven steam trains and a sawmill supported the industry within the woodland. Two dams, Lol Gray and the Old Mill Dam, provided good quality water to run the trains, as well as domestic water supplies that were carted by train to nearby towns including Narrogin.

Mallet bark was exported in ground form and was handled by a number of Fremantle exporters, notably Henry Will & Co., Rosenstamms and Joyce Bros. Production after 1959 declined rapidly, coinciding with a world glut, increased royalty and production costs, and increased competition from synthetic tannins. The industry had effectively collapsed by the early 1960s.

Replanted forests now extend over approximately 30%, or 8,300 hectares (21,000 acres), of Dryandra. Harvesting from plantation areas for timber production continues under the Department of Environment and Conservation's management plan, which includes a vision for the area over the next 100 years. Conservation studies have shown that the managed harvesting will have no detrimental impact on the fauna habitat.

In 1960, Arthur Hunter, a local farmer, started manufacturing tool handles from naturally fallen and low-grade felled wandoo and mallet. This cottage industry has now expanded to produce over 100,000 tool handles each year. As well as tool handles, fencing materials and cutting of firewood for domestic use provide local employment.

== Noongar use ==
The Dryandra area is the country of the Wiilman subgroup of the Aboriginal Noongar people. They have strong cultural links with Dryandra, which they know as Wilgadjny. Within the complex, five important archaeological sites have been identified, including an ochre pit used for body decoration and rock art. One Noongar man born in 1910 described the ochre pit as being "a very spirity place" and somewhere to be avoided at night. Other known sites include artefact scatters, stone arrangements and a scarred tree, however the woodland has not yet been fully surveyed for significant Aboriginal sites.

In 1995, following requests from local Aboriginal people, the Department of Environment and Conservation was considering the feasibility of permitting some cultural activities including hunting and camping within the woodland, to pass on skills to younger members of that community. If permitted, such activities would need to be managed on a sustainable basis to ensure that the conservation goals of the woodland are not compromised.

== Recent history ==
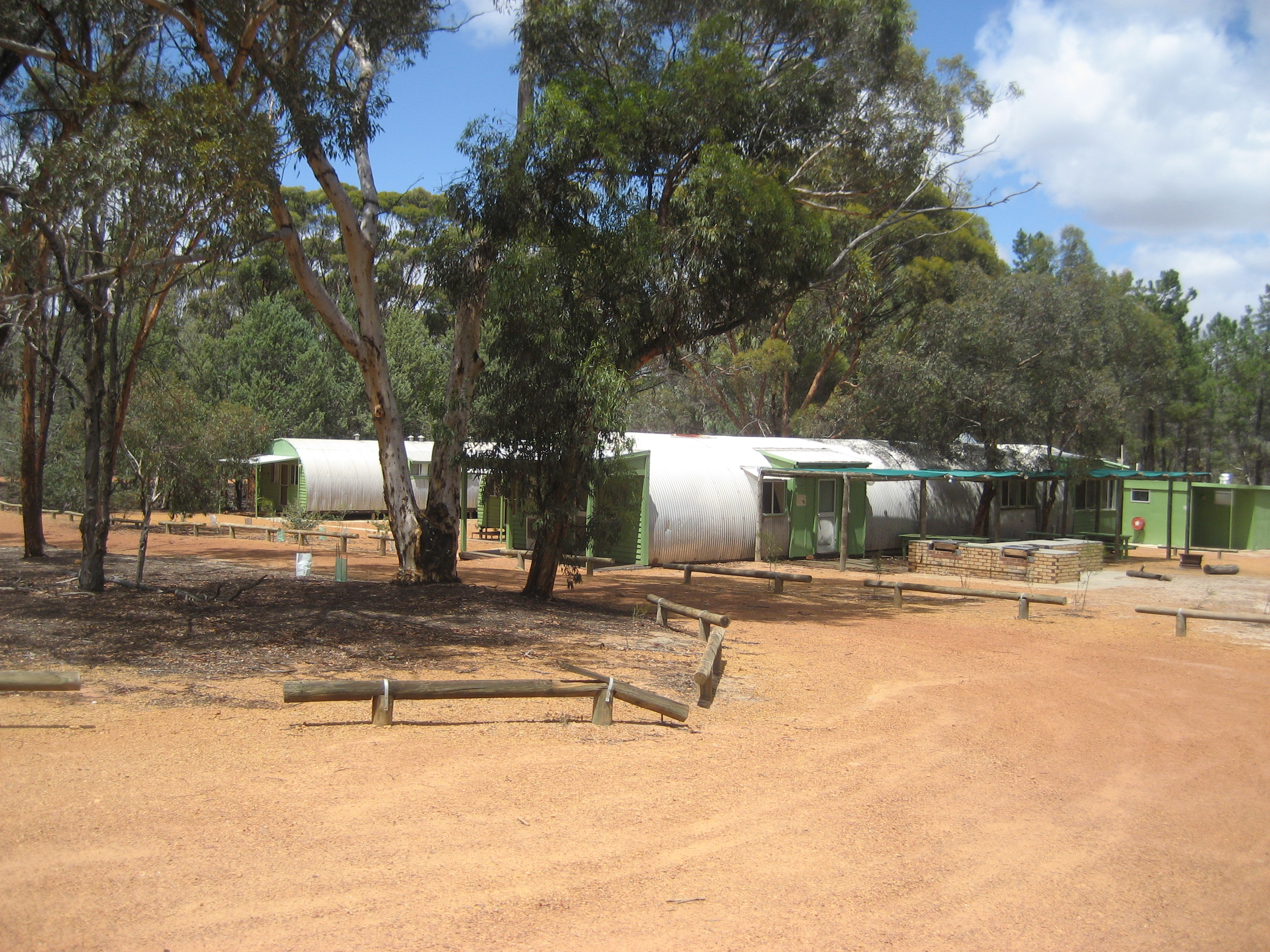
The Currawong Complex adjacent to the Lions village caters for groups of up to 60 visitors

Almost all of the land within the complex today was classified as a state forest in 1903 as an area for the protection of water catchments and growing wandoo and mallet forests.

In 1962, a sub-committee of the Western Australian branch of the Australian Academy of Science made recommendations which were reviewed in 1972 and 1974 by the Environmental Protection Authority of Western Australia. In summary, the recommendations were:

"The Committee emphasises the outstanding value of the Dryandra area as wildlife habitat. This is due largely to the protection and management which the area has hitherto received from the Forests Department. The Committee recommends:

- that state forests 51 ('Lol Gray') and 53 ('Montague') remain dedicated to that purpose;
- that no further portions of Dryandra Forest be planted with pines or other exotic species;
- that if any of the mallet plantations are felled they be regenerated to natural bush; and
- that the area be managed by the Forests Department as though it were a fauna and flora reserve and that if at any time the area is relinquished by the Forests Department it be made a Class 'A' reserve for the Conservation of Flora and Fauna, vested in the WA Wildlife Authority."

The recommendations were endorsed by the state cabinet in 1976. Since that time, Dryandra has been managed principally as a nature reserve but also for limited commercial operations related to plantation timber.

In 1995, a management plan was prepared by the Department of Conservation and Land Management for the Lands and Forest Commission who hold tenure over the state forests which form the woodland. The plan recommended (amongst other things) that the entire area be referred to officially as "Dryandra Woodland" rather than as various state forests in recognition of its structural difference with the taller and denser forests of the Darling Range. Previously, a smaller section had been referred to as "Dryandra", with other sections known by their various forestry names.

The principal objectives of the plan were:

- to achieve conservation, recreation and timber production goals, and in the next 70 to 100 years for the timber production role to be one of research and development;
- to "maintain and restore the natural environment, and to protect, care for, and promote the appreciation and study of, indigenous flora and fauna, and to preserve any feature of archaeological, historic or scientific interest".

== Accommodation and tourism ==
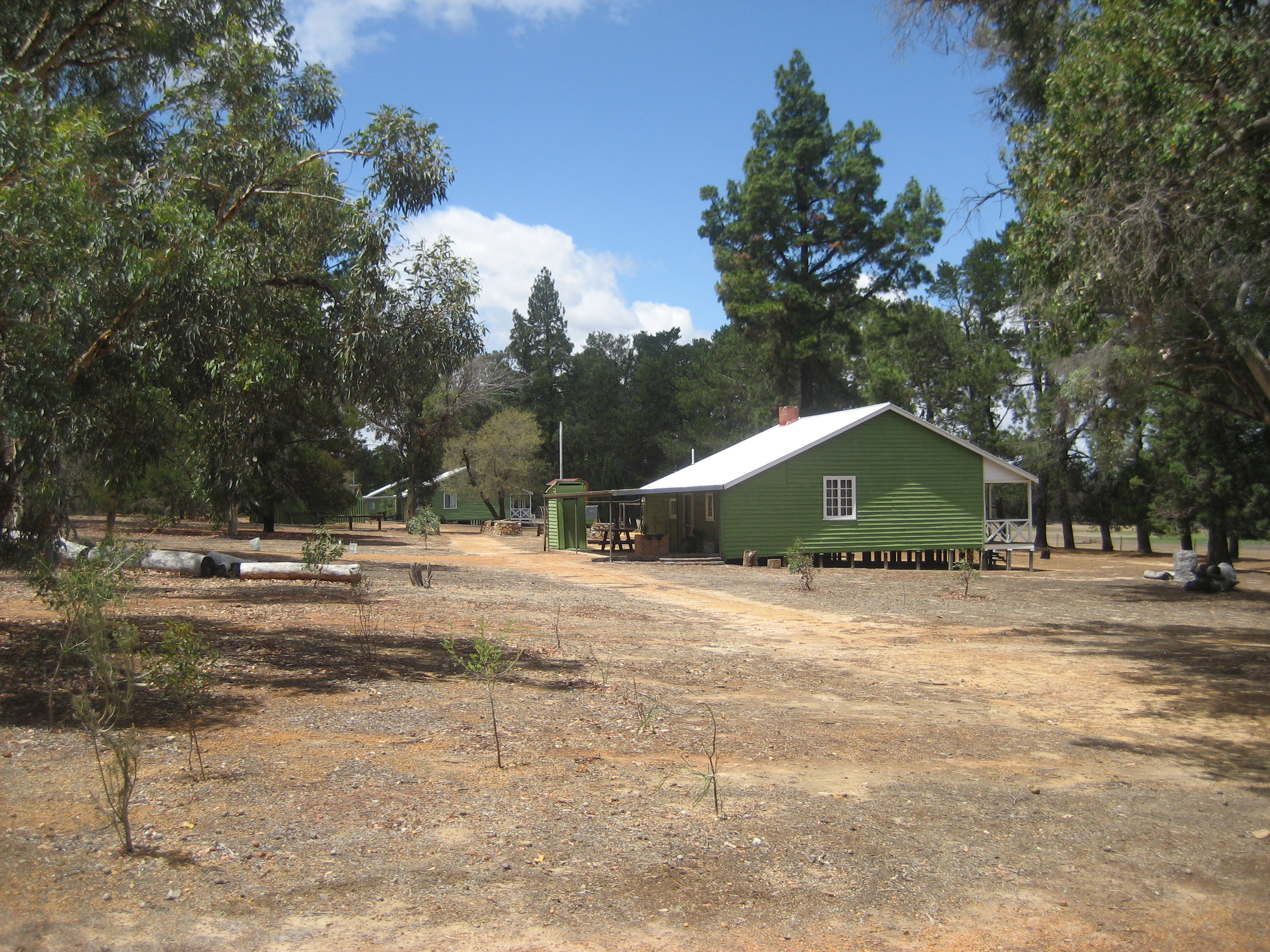
The Lions Village accommodation, which uses former forestry workers huts

Dryandra Woodland attracts approximately 30,000 visitors per annum, including 5,000 overnight visits at the Dryandra campsite and settlement within the complex. Accommodation is available at the Congelin and Gnaala Mia campgrounds and at the Lions Dryandra Village, which uses restored cottages from the 1920s Forests Department settlement. Adjacent to the cottages is the Currawong Complex, which has several Nissen huts acquired from an Air Force base and now used to accommodate up to 60 people in groups. The Lions Village was established by several Perth based Lions service clubs in 1972 with the intention of providing a holiday camp for disadvantaged children.

Two separate self-drive tours of 20 km (12 mi) and 25 km (16 mi) operate within Dryandra, where visitors can follow a marked trail in their own vehicles. On arrival at one of the five or six stop points, an approximate five-minute broadcast through the car's FM radio provides a narrative commentary explaining interesting aspects of the surrounding area. The commentaries are pre-recorded on microchips and broadcast using concealed low power transmitters charged by solar panels. Some of the broadcasts are staged conversations between characters describing day-to-day events in an early forestry worker's life in Dryandra. Others give a more technical explanation of a particular subject applicable to flora or fauna within a short distance of the car. For example, one stop discusses the naturally occurring poison pea plant (Gastrolobium spp) in the woodlands and the extraction and effect of the sodium fluoroacetate poison that occurs in the plant. Native mammalian herbivores have evolved with a high level of genetic tolerance to the toxin, which is deadly to introduced species including foxes. Baiting programs including the highly successful Western Shield project use sodium fluoroacetate to help control foxes without harming native fauna.

In addition, various 30 minute to five-hour bushwalks can be made along signposted trails through the woodlands, ranging in length from 1 to 12.5 kilometres (0.62 to 7.77 mi).
