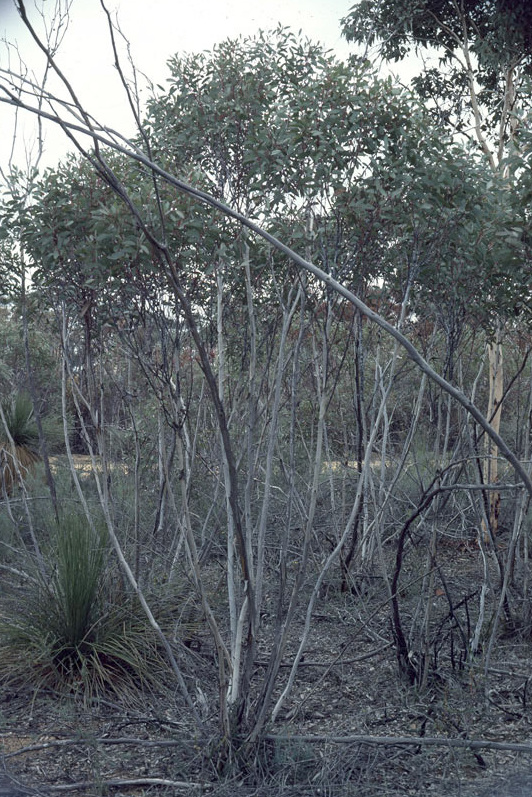
- Eucalyptus exilis near Boyagin Rock

Conservation status
- Priority Four — Rare Taxa (DEC)

Scientific classification
- Kingdom: Plantae
- Clade: Embryophytes
- Clade: Tracheophytes
- Clade: Spermatophytes
- Clade: Angiosperms
- Clade: Eudicots
- Clade: Rosids
- Order: Myrtales
- Family: Myrtaceae
- Genus: Eucalyptus
- Species: E. exilis

Binomial name
- Eucalyptus exilis Brooker

= Eucalyptus exilis =

Boyagin mallee

Species of eucalyptus

Eucalyptus exilis, commonly known as Boyagin mallee, is a species of mallee that is endemic to Western Australia. It has thin stems with smooth bark, lance-shaped adult leaves, flower buds in groups of eleven, white flowers and barrel-shaped to shortened spherical fruit.

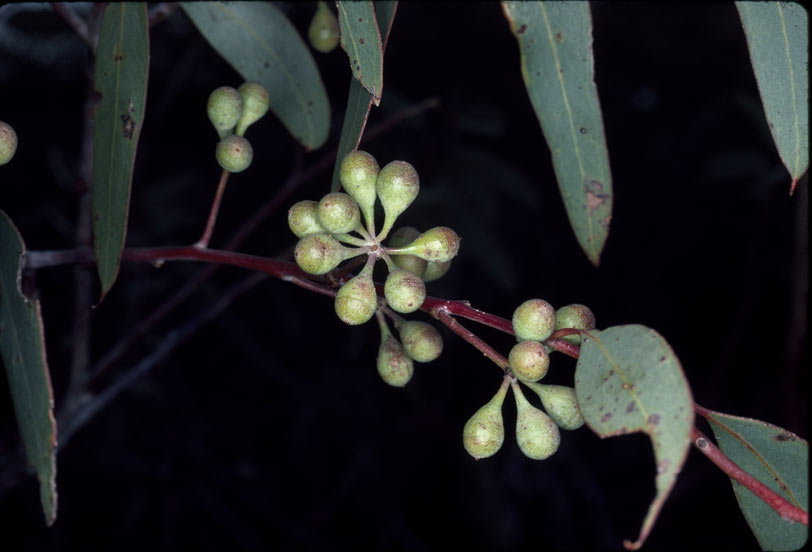
Flower buds

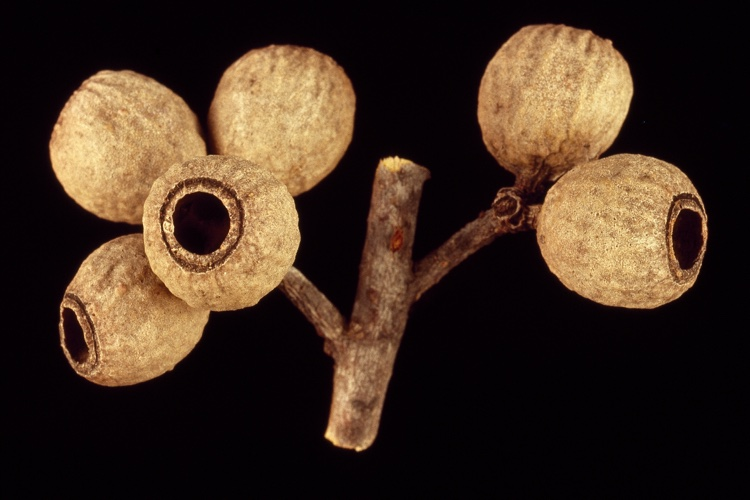
Fruit

== Description ==
Eucalyptus exilis is a mallee with a whipstick habit, typically grows to a height of 2–6 m (6 ft 7 in – 19 ft 8 in) and has a lignotuber. The trunk and branches have a covering of smooth, whitish to pale grey over yellow bark that is shed in long thin ribbons. Young plants and coppice regrowth have stems that are square in cross section and sessile, elliptical to egg-shaped leaves that are 50–75 mm (2.0–3.0 in) long and 40–50 mm (1.6–2.0 in) wide. Adult leaves are the same, slightly glossy green on both sides, elliptical to lance-shaped, 35–65 mm (1.4–2.6 in) long and 8–15 mm (0.31–0.59 in) wide on a petiole 8–15 mm (0.31–0.59 in) long.

The flower buds are arranged in leaf axils in groups of eleven on an unbranched peduncle 8–15 mm (0.31–0.59 in) long, the individual buds on pedicels 3–7 mm (0.12–0.28 in) long. Mature buds are oval to pear-shaped, 6–8 mm (0.24–0.31 in) long and 4–5 mm (0.16–0.20 in) wide with a rounded, sometimes pointed operculum. Flowering occurs between August and October and the flowers are white. The fruit is a woody barrel-shaped to shortened spherical capsule 8–15 mm (0.31–0.59 in) long and 9–13 mm (0.35–0.51 in) wide with the valves enclosed below the level of the rim. The seeds are blackish brown, obliquely pyramidal and 3–5 mm (0.12–0.20 in) long.

== Taxonomy ==
Eucalyptus exilis was first formally described by Ian Brooker and published in the journal Nuytsia. The specific epithet is taken from the Latin word exilis meaning slender in reference to the stems.

== Distribution ==
Boyagin mallee has a disjunct distribution in the wheatbelt region of Western Australia where it grows in heathland and shrubland on lateritic ridges in sandy loamy soils. The three main populations are found near Boyagin Rock, around Bindoon and north east of Mount Lesueur.

== Conservation status ==
This eucalypt is classified as "not threatened" by the Western Australian Government Department of Parks and Wildlife.

== See also ==
- List of Eucalyptus species
