= Xanthoparmelia nortegeta =

Scientific classification
- Kingdom: Fungi
- Division: Ascomycota
- Class: Lecanoromycetes
- Order: Lecanorales
- Family: Parmeliaceae
- Genus: Xanthoparmelia
- Species: X. nortegeta

Binomial name
- Xanthoparmelia nortegeta Elix (2003)
- Holotype: Boyagin Rock, Western Australia

Species of foliose lichen

Xanthoparmelia nortegeta is a species of saxicolous (rock-dwelling), foliose lichen in the family Parmeliaceae, described by John Elix in 2003. This lichen is endemic to Western Australia, particularly the Boyagin Nature Reserve.

== Taxonomy ==
Xanthoparmelia nortegeta was formally described as a new species in 2003 by the Australian lichenologist John Elix. This species was identified and named for its distinct morphological and chemical features, which differentiate it from closely related species like X. tegeta and X. subnuda. The type specimen of X. nortegeta was collected by Elix on 11 September 1994. It was found growing on granite rocks across large exposed outcrops at Boyagin Rock in Western Australia's Boyagin Nature Reserve, approximately 20 kilometres northwest of Pingelly at an elevation of 350 metres. The holotype specimen is housed at the Western Australian Herbarium (PERTH).

== Description ==
The thallus of Xanthoparmelia nortegeta is foliose (leafy), moderately adnate, and can grow up to 10 cm wide. It features congested, more or less linear to elongated lobes that are 0.3 to 1.0 mm wide and often branch dichotomously or trichotomously. The upper surface is yellow-green, becoming flat to weakly convex as it matures, and remains smooth and unmarked by reproductive structures such as isidia or soredia. The medulla is white, and the lower surface is smooth and jet-black with sparse, simple to occasionally branched, black rhizines.

Reproductive structures include scattered apothecia (fruiting bodies) that are sessile to somewhat stipitate, with a shiny dark brown disc measuring 0.5 to 1.0 mm wide. The ascospores formed are ellipsoid, measuring 7–8 by 4–6 μm.

Chemically, the lichen does not react to potassium hydroxide solution (the K spot test) on the cortex but shows a yellow then red reaction in the medulla. It contains significant amounts of norstictic acid and minor amounts of salazinic acid, with trace amounts of connorstictic acid, among other compounds.

== Habitat and distribution ==
At the time of its original publication, Xanthoparmelia nortegeta was only known from its type locality at Boyagin Rock in the Boyagin Nature Reserve, located 20 km (12 mi) northwest of Pingelly. This lichen grows on granite rocks within sun-exposed outcrops in a dry, heathy sclerophyll forest environment.

== See also ==
- List of Xanthoparmelia species
