= Leioproctus rejectus =

Scientific classification
- Kingdom: Animalia
- Phylum: Arthropoda
- Clade: Pancrustacea
- Class: Insecta
- Order: Hymenoptera
- Family: Colletidae
- Genus: Leioproctus
- Species: L. rejectus

Binomial name
- Leioproctus rejectus (Cockerell, 1905)

Synonyms
- Euryglossa rejecta Cockerell, 1905; Leioproctus (Colletellus) claviger Leijs, Dorey & Hogendoorn, 2018

Species of bee

Leioproctus rejectus, or Leioproctus (Colletellus) rejectus, is a species of bee in the family Colletidae and subfamily Colletinae. It is endemic to Australia. It was described by British-American entomologist Theodore Dru Alison Cockerell in 1905.

== Distribution and habitat ==
The species occurs in south-west Western Australia. Type localities include Perth and Dryandra.

== Behaviour ==
The adults are flying mellivores. Flowering plants visited by the bees include Caladenia species.
