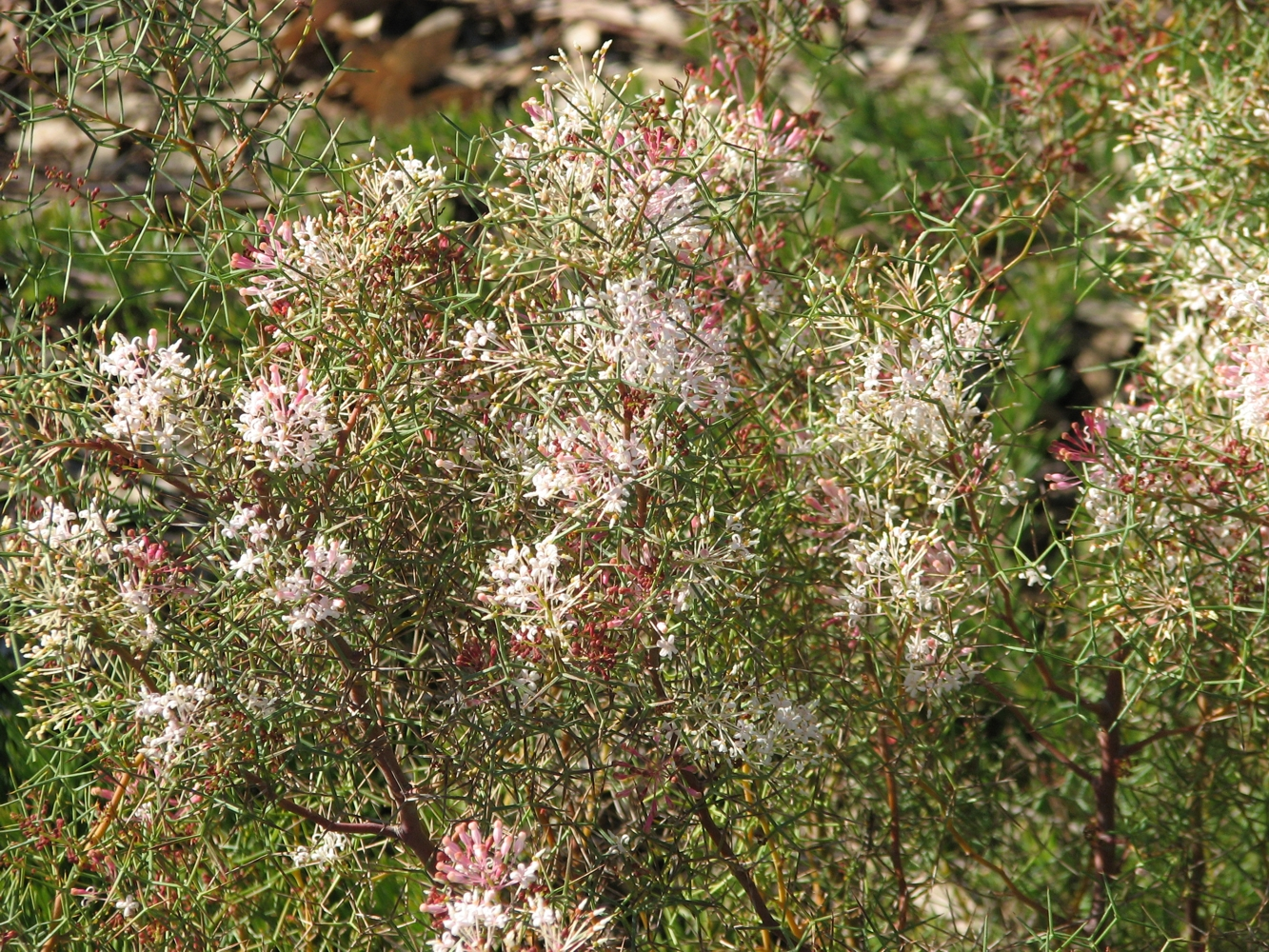
- In Royal Botanic Gardens, Cranbourne

Conservation status
- Vulnerable (IUCN 3.1)

Scientific classification
- Kingdom: Plantae
- Clade: Embryophytes
- Clade: Tracheophytes
- Clade: Angiosperms
- Clade: Eudicots
- Order: Proteales
- Family: Proteaceae
- Genus: Grevillea
- Species: G. levis

Binomial name
- Grevillea levis Olde & Marriott

= Grevillea levis =

Species of shrub endemic to Western Australia

Grevillea levis is a species of flowering plant in the family Proteaceae and is endemic to the west of Western Australia. It is a dense shrub with divided leaves, the end lobes linear and sharply pointed, and clusters of white to cream-coloured flowers, sometimes flushed with pink.

== Description ==
Grevillea levis is a dense shrub that typically grows to a height of 1–2 m (3 ft 3 in – 6 ft 7 in), its branchlets glabrous. The leaves are mostly 20–30 mm (0.79–1.18 in) long and divided with three to five lobes, the end lobes linear, 5–20 mm (0.20–0.79 in) long and 0.3–0.8 mm (0.012–0.031 in) wide, the edges rolled under, the tip sharply-pointed. The flowers are arranged in more or less spherical or domed clusters on a glabrous rachis. The flowers are white to cream-coloured, sometimes tinged with pink, the pistil about 3.5 mm (0.14 in) long. Flowering occurs from May to October, and the fruit is an oval to oblong follicle 6–9 mm (0.24–0.35 in) long.

== Taxonomy ==
Grevillea levis was first formally described in 1994 by Peter M. Olde and Neil R. Marriott in The Grevillea Book, from specimens collected by Olde near Mount Churchman (near Karroun Hill Nature Reserve) in 1991. The specific epithet (levis) means "smooth", referring to the fruit.

== Distribution and habitat ==
This grevillea grows in heath or shrubland between the lower Murchison River, Coorow and Dalwallinu and inland to Bullfinch and Coolgardie, in the Avon Wheatbelt, Coolgardie, Geraldton Sandplains, Murchison and Yalgoo bioregions of western Western Australia.

== Conservation status ==
Grevillea levis is listed as 'Not threatened' by the Department of Biodiversity, Conservation and Attractions but as 'Vulnerable' in the IUCN Red List.
