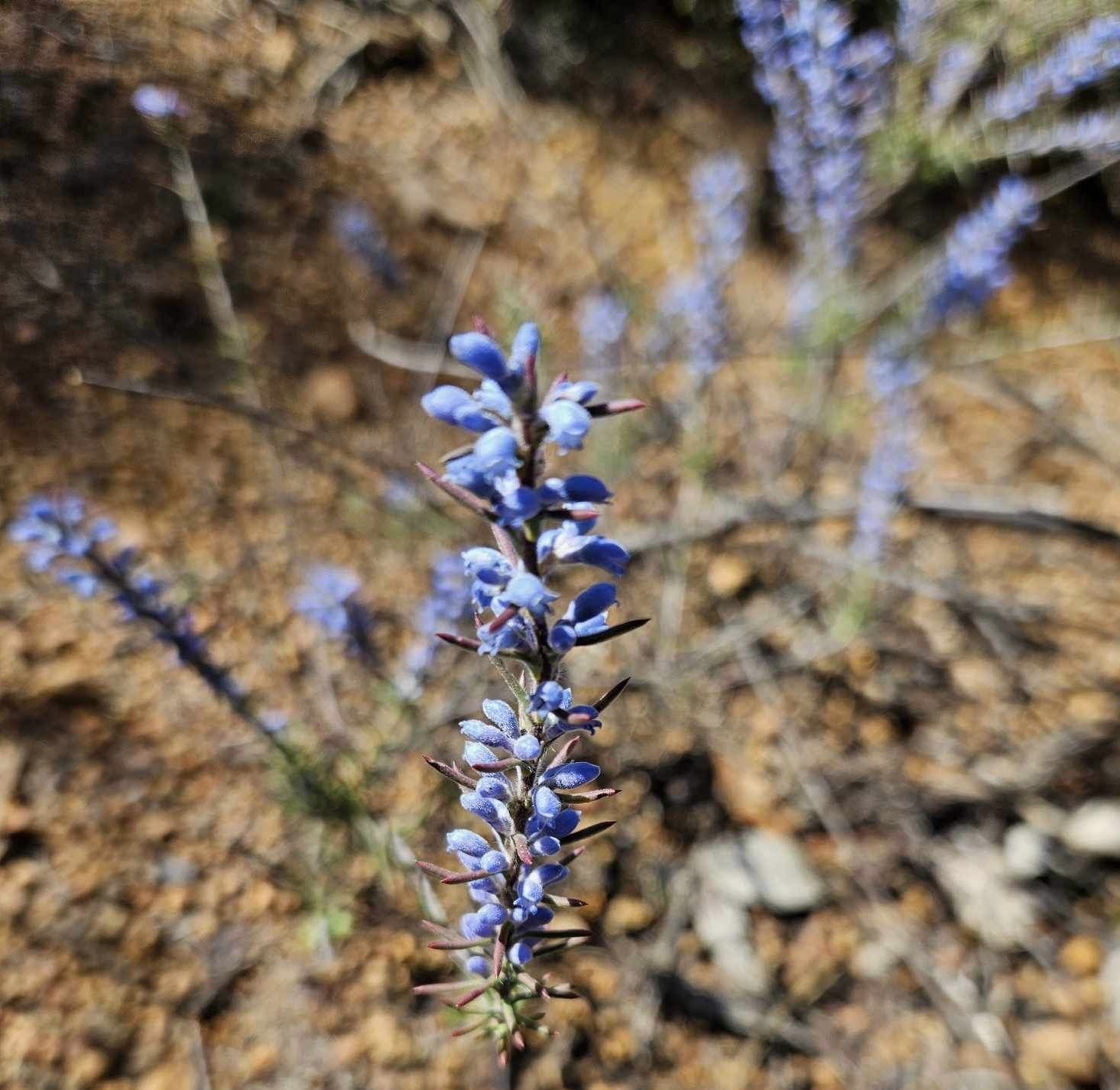
- In Dryandra Woodland National Park

Scientific classification
- Kingdom: Plantae
- Clade: Tracheophytes
- Clade: Angiosperms
- Clade: Eudicots
- Order: Proteales
- Family: Proteaceae
- Genus: Conospermum
- Species: C. amoenum

Binomial name
- Conospermum amoenum Meisn.

Synonyms
- Conospermum suaveolens D.A.Herb.; Conospermum suaveolensis E.M.Benn. orth. var.; Conospermum suaveolente D.A.Herb. orth. var.

= Conospermum amoenum =

Blue smokebush

Species of Australian shrub

Conospermum amoenum, commonly known as blue smokebush, is a species of flowering plant in the family Proteaceae and is endemic to the south-west of Western Australia. It is an erect or spreading shrub with linear leaves, and spikes of blue or white tube-shaped flowers.

== Description ==
Conospermum amoenum is an erect or spreading shrub that typically grows to a height of 1 m (3 ft 3 in) and 1.5 m (4 ft 11 in) wide. It has linear leaves 9–17 mm (0.35–0.67 in) long and 0.5–1 mm (0.020–0.039 in) wide. The flowers are blue or white, arranged in spikes of 4 to 8, the flowers forming a tube 2–4 mm (0.079–0.157 in) long. The upper lip is broadly egg-shaped, 1.5–2.5 mm (0.059–0.098 in) long wide, the lower lip joined for 0.75–1.0 mm (0.030–0.039 in) long with oblong lobes 1.0–1.5 mm (0.039–0.059 in) long with a prominent mid-vein. Flowering occurs from July to October and the fruit is a hairy, golden nut 1.75–2.0 mm (0.069–0.079 in) long and 2.0–2.5 mm (0.079–0.098 in) wide.

== Taxonomy ==
Conospermum amoenum was first formally described in 1845 by the botanist Carl Meissner in Johann Georg Christian Lehmann's book, Plantae Preissianae from specimens collected on the Darling Range in 1841.

In 1995, Eleanor Marion Bennett described the subspecies Conospermum amoenum subsp. cuneatum, and that name, and the name of the autonym are accepted by the Australian Plant Census:

- Conospermum amoenum Meisn. subsp. amoenum has auricles on its floral leaves and most of it stem leaves.
- Conospermum amoenum subsp. cuneatum E.M.Benn. has stem leaves and floral leaves expanded at the base, but without auricles.

== Distribution and habitat ==
Conospermum amoenum is found on ironstone hills and uplands in the Avon Wheatbelt, Esperance Plains, Jarrah Forest Mallee and Swan Coastal Plain bioregions of Western Australia where it grows in sandy to sandy clay soils often containing lateritic gravel. Subspecies amoenum is common between Waroona and Dalwallinu on the Darling Scarp and subsp. cuneatum is less common, found between Dryandra and York.

== Conservation status ==
Both subspecies of Conospermum amoenum are listed as "not threatened" by the Government of Western Australia Department of Parks and Wildlife.
