= Acacia cuneifolia =

Conservation status
- Priority Four — Rare Taxa (DEC)

Scientific classification
- Kingdom: Plantae
- Clade: Tracheophytes
- Clade: Angiosperms
- Clade: Eudicots
- Clade: Rosids
- Order: Fabales
- Family: Fabaceae
- Subfamily: Caesalpinioideae
- Clade: Mimosoid clade
- Genus: Acacia
- Species: A. cuneifolia

Binomial name
- Acacia cuneifolia Maslin
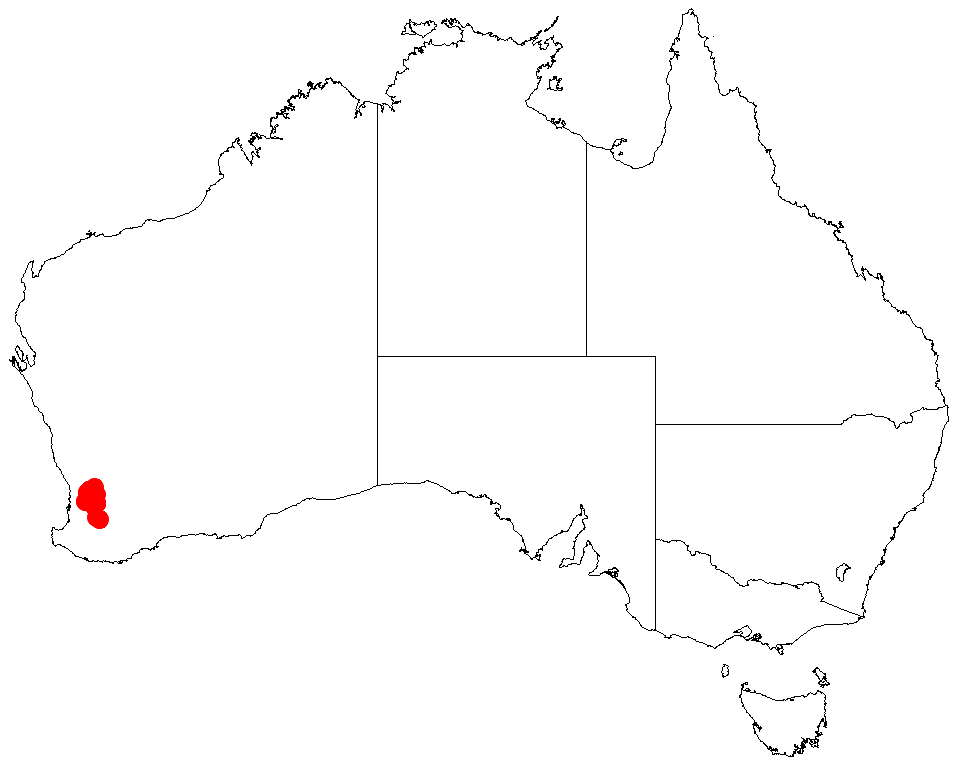
- Occurrence data from AVH

Synonyms
- Acacia aff. congesta (J.S.Beard 8124); Racosperma cuneifolium (Maslin) Pedley

Species of legume

Acacia cuneifolia is a species of flowering plant in the family Fabaceae and is endemic to the south-west of Western Australia. It is an erect or straggly shrub with sometimes hairy branchlets, hairy clusters of variably-shaped phyllodes with a sharp point on the end, more or less spherical heads of golden yellow flowers and curved to coiled, glabrous pods.

== Description ==
Acacia cuneifolia is an erect or straggly shrub that typically grows to a height of 1–3 m (3 ft 3 in – 9 ft 10 in). Its branchlets are sometimes glabrous sometimes hairy. The phyllodes are sometimes arranged in clusters and are variably shaped, often with one side straight and the other side curved, wedge-shaped or oblong, 8–25 mm (0.31–0.98 in) long and 2–6 mm (0.079–0.236 in) wide with a sharp point on the end. There are stipules 1–3 mm (0.039–0.118 in) long at the base of the phyllodes, more or less spiny with age but often only with the base persisting. The flowers are borne in up to six, more or less spherical heads on a peduncle 5–20 mm (0.20–0.79 in) long, the heads 3.5–4.5 mm (0.14–0.18 in) in diameter with 23 to 25 golden yellow flowers. Flowering has been recorded in September and October, and the pods are strongly curved to coiled, up to 50 mm (2.0 in) long and 4.5–5.5 mm (0.18–0.22 in) wide and glabrous. The seeds are oblong to slightly elliptic, 4–5 mm (0.16–0.20 in) long, dull, dark brown with a cream-coloured aril on the end.

== Taxonomy ==
Acacia cuneifolia was first formally described in 1999 the journal Nuytsia by Bruce Maslin from specimens he collected on Pony Hill, 18 km (11 mi) due south-west of York in 1987. The specific epithet (cuneifolia) means 'wedge-leaved', referring to the shape of the phyllodes.

== Distribution ==
This species of wattle grows in dark brown clay and coarse sand on granite rocks near the type location, about halfway between Perth and Brookton, and in the Boyagin Rock Reserve in the Avon Wheatbelt and Jarrah Forest bioregions of south-western Western Australia.

== Conservation status ==
Acacia cuneifolia is listed as "Priority Four" by the Government of Western Australia, Department of Biodiversity, Conservation and Attractions, meaning that is rare or near threatened.

== See also ==
- List of Acacia species
