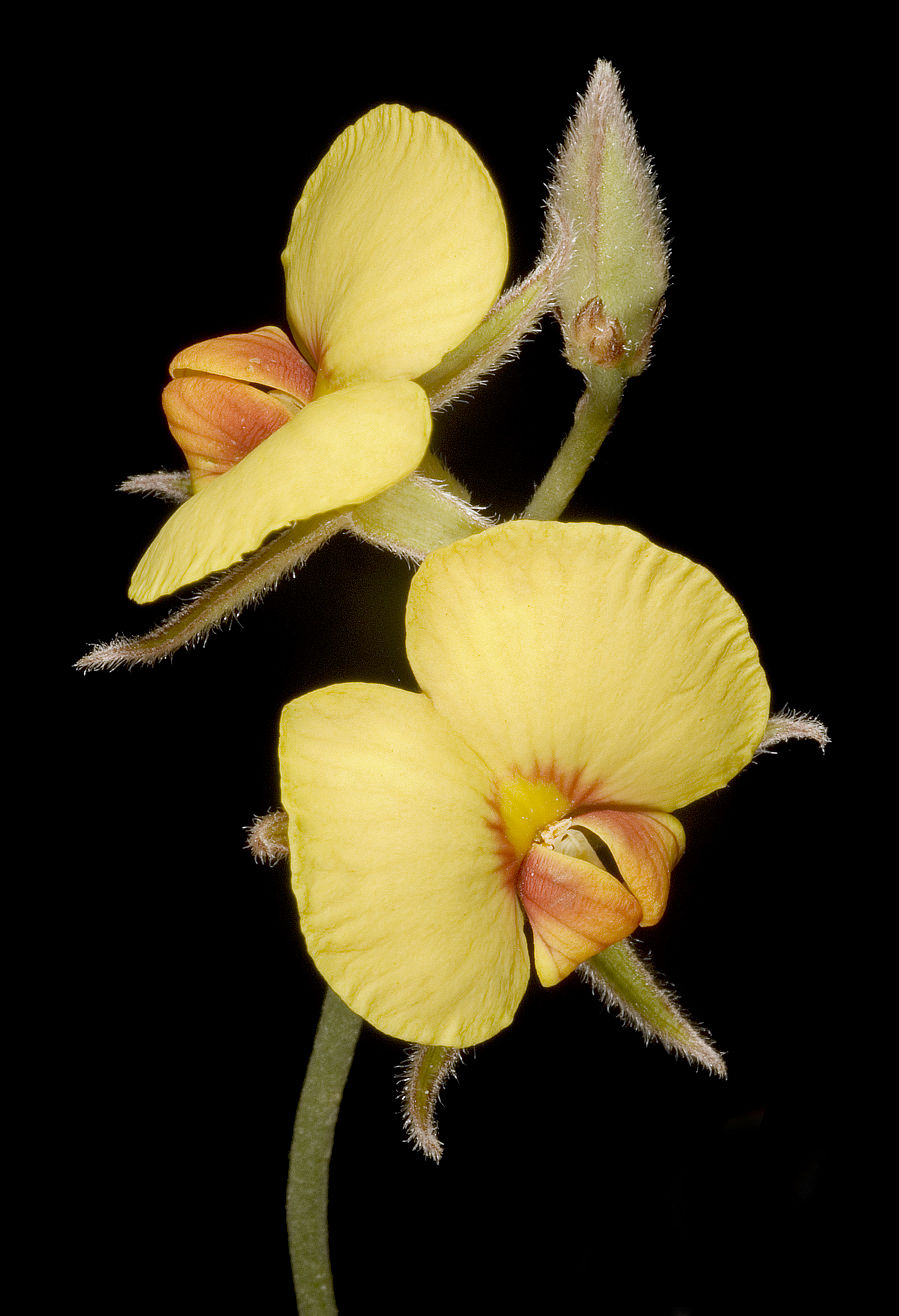

Scientific classification
- Kingdom: Plantae
- Clade: Tracheophytes
- Clade: Angiosperms
- Clade: Eudicots
- Clade: Rosids
- Order: Fabales
- Family: Fabaceae
- Subfamily: Faboideae
- Genus: Jacksonia
- Species: J. restioides

Binomial name
- Jacksonia restioides Meisn.

Synonyms
- Piptomeris restioides (Meisn.) Greene

= Jacksonia restioides =

Species of legume

Jacksonia restioides is a species of flowering plant in the family Fabaceae and is endemic to the south-west of Western Australia. It is an erect or straggling shrub with greyish-green branches, the end branches sharply-pointed phylloclades, the leaves reduced to dark brown, egg-shaped scales, yellow flowers with red markings, and woody, densely hairy, more or less round pods.

== Description ==
Jacksonia restioides is an erect to spreading or straggling shrub that typically grows up to 0.15–1 m (5.9 in – 3 ft 3.4 in) high and 30–80 cm (12–31 in) wide. It has greyish-green branches, the end branches sharply-pointed phylloclades, its leaves reduced to egg-shaped, dark brown scales, 1.5–3.5 mm (0.059–0.138 in) long and 1.2–2.4 mm (0.047–0.094 in) wide with toothed edges. The flowers are scattered near the ends of branches on a pedicel 1.0–2.9 mm (0.039–0.114 in) long, with egg-shaped bracteoles 1.8–3 mm (0.071–0.118 in) long and 0.8–1.3 mm (0.031–0.051 in) wide on the upper part of the pedicel. The floral tube is 1.9–2.5 mm (0.075–0.098 in) long and not ribbed, and the sepals are membranous, with lobes 6.2–9 mm (0.24–0.35 in) long, 2.0–2.9 mm (0.079–0.114 in) wide and fused for 1.3–1.5 mm (0.051–0.059 in). The standard petal is yellow with a red "eye", 10.5–12 mm (0.41–0.47 in) long and 17–19.5 mm (0.67–0.77 in) deep, the wings yellow with red markings 7.3–8.3 mm (0.29–0.33 in) long, and the keel is yellow with red markings, 3.2–4.4 mm (0.13–0.17 in) long. The stamens have red filaments, 1.9–4.5 mm (0.075–0.177 in) long. Flowering occurs from August to May, and the fruit is a more or less round, woody, densely hairy pod 8–10 mm (0.31–0.39 in) long and 5.3–10 mm (0.21–0.39 in) wide.

== Taxonomy ==
Jacksonia restioides was first formally described in 1844 by Carl Meissner in Lehmann'sPlantae Preissianae. The specific epithet (restioides) means 'like Restio'.

== Distribution and habitat ==
This species of Jacksonia grows on sand over laterite or granite in heathland or woodland between Eneabba and Dryandra in the Avon Wheatbelt, Geraldton Sandplains, Jarrah Forest and Swan Coastal Plain bioregions of south-western Western Australia.

== Conservation status ==
Jacksonia restioides is listed as "not threatened" by the Government of Western Australia Department of Biodiversity, Conservation and Attractions.
