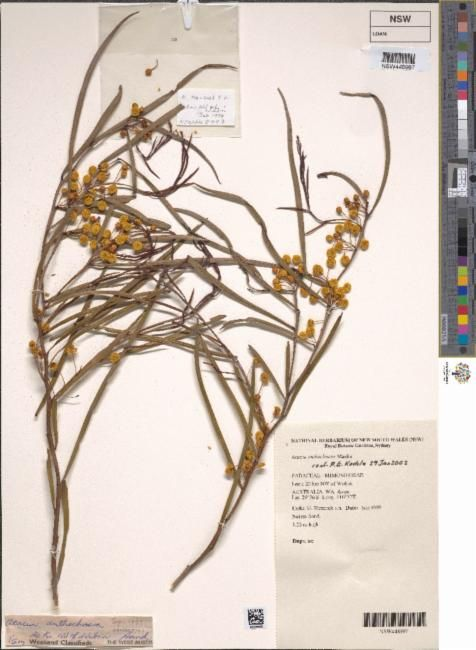

Conservation status
- Least Concern (IUCN 3.1)

Scientific classification
- Kingdom: Plantae
- Clade: Embryophytes
- Clade: Tracheophytes
- Clade: Spermatophytes
- Clade: Angiosperms
- Clade: Eudicots
- Clade: Rosids
- Order: Fabales
- Family: Fabaceae
- Subfamily: Caesalpinioideae
- Clade: Mimosoid clade
- Genus: Acacia
- Species: A. anthochaera

Binomial name
- Acacia anthochaera Maslin
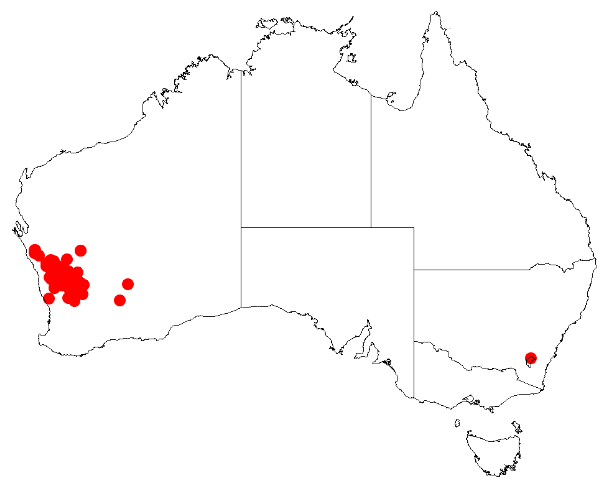
- Occurrence data from AVH

Synonyms
- Racosperma anthochaerum (Maslin) Pedley

= Acacia anthochaera =

Species of legume

Acacia anthochaera, commonly known as Kimberly's wattle, is a species of flowering plant in the family Fabaceae and is endemic to Western Australia. It is a rounded shrub or tree with narrowly linear phyllodes, racemes of 4 to 9 spherical heads of bright light golden flowers, and narrowly oblong, papery pods up to 85 mm (3.3 in) long.

== Description ==
Acacia anthochaera is a glabrous, rounded shrub or tree that typically grows to a height of 1–5 m (3 ft 3 in – 16 ft 5 in), sometimes to 7 m (23 ft). Its phyllodes are narrowly linear, mostly 90–150 mm (3.5–5.9 in) long and 2–5 mm (0.079–0.197 in) wide, with a gland on the upper edge of the phyllode. The flowers are arranged in one or two racemes in the axils of phyllodes, 7–15 mm (0.28–0.59 in) long, with 4 to 9 spherical heads on a peduncle 7–12 mm (0.28–0.47 in) long. The heads contains 25 to 35 light golden flowers. Flowering has been recorded from August to December, with the main flush in September, and the pod is a narrowly oblong, papery pod up to 85 mm (3.3 in) long and 5–8 mm (0.20–0.31 in) wide, containing dark brown to blackish, oblong to elliptic or egg-shaped seeds 4–5 mm (0.16–0.20 in) long and 3.0–3.5 mm (0.12–0.14 in) wide.

== Taxonomy ==
Acacia anthochaera was first formally described in 1995 by the botanist Bruce Maslin in the journal Nuytsia from specimens he collected 104.5 km (64.9 mi) south of Paynes Find in 1984. The specific epithet (anthochaera) means 'rejoice flower', alluding to the colour of the flower heads. The common name (Kimberly's wattle) commemorates the birth of the author's daughter, Kimberley Sarah Maslin, in March 1991.

== Distribution and habitat ==
This species of wattle grows in sand or loam in woodland or shrubland in low-lying areas from near Yuna to Cowcowing and near Galena bridge and Karroun Hill in the Avon Wheatbelt, Coolgardie, Geraldton Sandplains, Murchison and Yalgoo bioregion of Western Australia.

== See also ==
- List of Acacia species
