= Pterostylis insectifera =

Insect-lipped rufous greenhood

Scientific classification
- Kingdom: Plantae
- Clade: Tracheophytes
- Clade: Angiosperms
- Clade: Monocots
- Order: Asparagales
- Family: Orchidaceae
- Subfamily: Orchidoideae
- Tribe: Cranichideae
- Genus: Pterostylis
- Species: P. insectifera

Binomial name
- Pterostylis insectifera M.A.Clem.

Synonyms
- Oligochaetochilus insectiferus (M.A.Clem. Szlach.

Species of orchid

Pterostylis insectifera, commonly known as the insect-lipped rufous greenhood, or leaden rustyhood is a plant in the orchid family Orchidaceae and is endemic to the south-west of Western Australia. Both flowering and non-flowering plants have a relatively large rosette of leaves. Flowering plants have a similar rosette and up to eight or more flowers which have long, stiffly-held lateral sepals and a protruding, insect-like labellum.

== Description ==
Pterostylis insectifera is a terrestrial, perennial, deciduous, herb with an underground tuber and a rosette of between five and twelve leaves. The leaves are 18–45 mm (0.7–2 in) long and 8–12 mm (0.3–0.5 in) wide. Flowering plants have a rosette at the base of the flowering stem but the leaves are usually withered by flowering time. Between two and eight or more translucent white, green and dark brown flowers 20–25 mm (0.8–1 in) long and 7–9 mm (0.3–0.4 in) wide are borne on a flowering spike 200–350 mm (8–10 in) tall. The dorsal sepal and petals form a hood or "galea" over the column with the dorsal sepal having a narrow tip 8–10 mm (0.3–0.4 in) long. The lateral sepals turn downwards, towards the ovary and are stiffly-held and narrower than the galea. They suddenly taper to narrow tips 10–16 mm (0.4–0.6 in) long which turn forward and are roughly parallel to each other. The labellum is fleshy, dark brown and insect-like, 4–5 mm (0.16–0.20 in) long, about 2 mm (0.08 in) wide and has an enlarged "head" end with short bristles and a "body" with eight to twelve longer hairs. Flowering occurs from September to November.

== Taxonomy and naming ==
Pterostylis insectifera was first formally described in 1989 by Mark Clements from a specimen he cultured in the Australian National Botanic Gardens in 1980. The original material was collected by Clements, east of Hyden and the description was published in Australian Orchid Research. The specific epithet (insectifera) is derived from the Latin insectiferum meaning 'insect bearing', referring to the insect-like labellum.

== Distribution and habitat ==
The insect-lipped rufous greenhood grows in woodland and shrubland, sometimes on granite outcrops between Karroun Hill, Ravensthorpe and Norseman in the Avon Wheatbelt, Coolgardie, Esperance Plains and Mallee biogeographic regions.

== Conservation ==
Pterostylis insectifera is classified as "not threatened" by the Western Australian Government Department of Parks and Wildlife.
