= Persoonia hakeiformis =

Conservation status
- Priority Two — Poorly Known Taxa (DEC)

Scientific classification
- Kingdom: Plantae
- Clade: Tracheophytes
- Clade: Angiosperms
- Clade: Eudicots
- Order: Proteales
- Family: Proteaceae
- Genus: Persoonia
- Species: P. hakeiformis

Binomial name
- Persoonia hakeiformis Meisn.]

Synonyms
- Linkia hakeiformis (Meisn.) Kuntze; Persoonia hakeaeformis Meisn. orth. var.; Persoonia hakeiformis Meisn. nom. inval., nom. nud.

Species of flowering plant

Persoonia hakeiformis is a species of flowering plant in the family Proteaceae and is endemic to the south-west of Western Australia. It is an erect or spreading to low-lying shrub with mostly smooth bark, linear leaves and bright yellow flowers borne in groups of up to sixty along a rachis up to 100 mm (3.9 in) long.

== Description ==
Persoonia hakeiformis is an erect or spreading to low-lying shrub that typically grows to a height of 0.3–1.8 m (1 ft 0 in – 5 ft 11 in) with smooth, mottled grey bark, flaky near the base, and branchlets that are hairy when young. The leaves are arranged alternately along the stems, linear, 15–50 mm (0.59–1.97 in) long and 0.8–1.4 mm (0.031–0.055 in) wide and grooved on the lower surface. The flowers are arranged singly or in groups of up to sixty along a rachis up to 100 mm (3.9 in) long, each flower on a pedicel 3–7 mm (0.12–0.28 in) long. The tepals are bright yellow, 8–12 mm (0.31–0.47 in) long, the lowest tepal deeply sac-like with its anther fused to it. Flowering occurs from November to January and the fruit is a smooth drupe 8–13 mm (0.31–0.51 in) long and 5–6 mm (0.20–0.24 in) wide.

== Taxonomy ==
Persoonia hakeiformis was first formally described in 1856 by Carl Meissner in de Candolle's Prodromus Systematis Naturalis Regni Vegetabilis.

== Distribution and habitat ==
This geebung has been collected at the Boyagin Nature Reserve, Tarin Rock and Newdegate in the south-west of Western Australia, where it grows in heath and woodland.

== Conservation status ==
Persoonia hakeiformis is classified as "Priority Two" by the Western Australian Government Department of Parks and Wildlife meaning that it is poorly known and from only one or a few locations.
