= Eucalyptus aspersa =

Conservation status
- Least Concern (IUCN 3.1)

Scientific classification
- Kingdom: Plantae
- Clade: Tracheophytes
- Clade: Angiosperms
- Clade: Eudicots
- Clade: Rosids
- Order: Myrtales
- Family: Myrtaceae
- Genus: Eucalyptus
- Species: E. aspersa

Binomial name
- Eucalyptus aspersa Brooker & Hopper

Species of eucalyptus

Eucalyptus aspersa is a mallee, sometimes a tree that is endemic to the South West region of Western Australia. It usually has rough bark on its stems and branches, lance-shaped adult leaves, white flowers and urn-shaped fruit.

== Description ==
Eucalyptus aspersa is usually a mallee typically growing to a height of 4 metres (13.1 ft) but on Mount Saddleback is a tree to 8 metres (26.2 ft) high. It forms a lignotuber at the base of the trunk and has rough fibrous or flaky, light grey to yellowish bark that is loosely held or partly detached on part of the stems. Leaves on young plants and on coppice regrowth are elliptic to egg-shaped, bluish green, 20–75 mm (0.8–3 in) long and 14–30 mm (0.6–1 in) wide. The adult leaves are lance-shaped, slightly glossy, light green, 55–120 mm (2–5 in) long, 10–20 mm (0.4–0.8 in) wide on a petiole 5–20 mm (0.2–0.8 in) long.

The flowers are arranged in unbranched groups of seven or more on a peduncle 5–12 mm (0.2–0.5 in) long, the individual flowers on a pedicel 2–4 mm (0.08–0.2 in) long. The mature buds have are narrow oval, 8–11 mm (0.3–0.4 in) long and 3–4 mm (0.1–0.2 in) wide. The operculum is beaked, and 5–8 mm (0.2–0.3 in) long. The flowers are white and the fruit are woody, more or less spherical to cup-shaped, 14–30 mm (0.6–1 in) After flowering it will produce globose to cup-shaped fruit 4–8 mm (0.2–0.3 in) long and 4–7 mm (0.2–0.3 in) wide. The seeds are brown or grey oval and 9–11 mm (0.4–0.4 in).

== Taxonomy and naming ==
Eucalyptus aspersa was first formally described in 1993 by Stephen Hopper and Ian Brooker from a specimen collected by Brooker in 1985 near the Albany Highway north of the Serpentine River crossing. The description was published in the journal Nuytsia. The specific epithet (aspersa) is a Latin word meaning "scattered" or "sprinkled", referring to the occurrence of this species.

== Distribution and habitat ==
This eucalypt is found on flats and ridges in the southern Wheatbelt region of Western Australia between Toodyay in the north, Collie in the west and south to Woodanilling where it grows in lateritic gravel and sandy loam soils around granite. It is found on flats and ridges where it grows in gravelly-sandy-loamy soils over granite.

== See also ==
- List of Eucalyptus species
