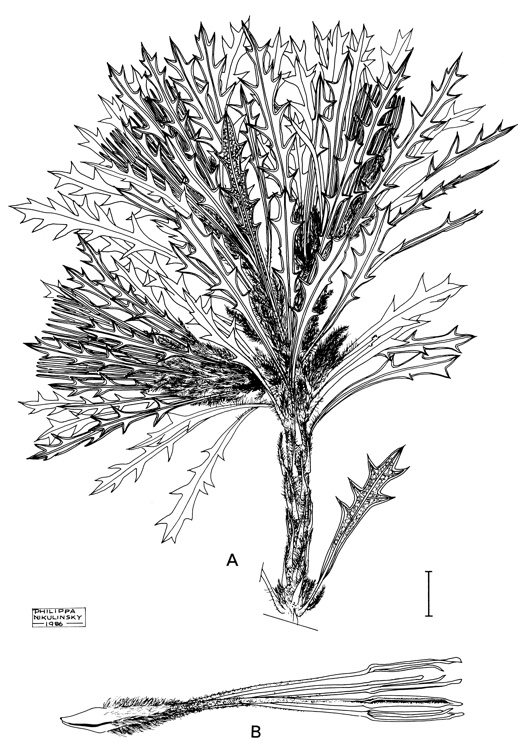
- Illustration of flowers and subtending leaves

Conservation status
- Priority Four — Rare Taxa (DEC)

Scientific classification
- Kingdom: Plantae
- Clade: Tracheophytes
- Clade: Angiosperms
- Clade: Eudicots
- Order: Proteales
- Family: Proteaceae
- Genus: Banksia
- Subgenus: Banksia subg. Banksia
- Series: Banksia ser. Dryandra
- Species: B. cynaroides

Binomial name
- Banksia cynaroides (C.A.Gardner) A.R.Mast & K.R.Thiele

Synonyms
- Dryandra cynaroides C.A.Gardner

= Banksia cynaroides =

Species of shrub native to Australia

Banksia cynaroides is a species of shrub that is endemic to Western Australia. It has crowded, linear, pinnatifid leaves, white and dull golden yellow flowers and few follicles in each head.

== Description ==
Banksia cynaroides is an erect, rigid shrub that typically grows to a height of 1.5–2 m (4 ft 11 in – 6 ft 7 in) and forms a lignotuber. The leaves are linear but widen near the tip, pinnatifid, 40–80 mm (1.6–3.1 in) long, 7–13 mm (0.28–0.51 in) wide on a petiole up to 10 mm (0.39 in) long and crowded around the flowers. The lobes of the leaves are triangular and sharply pointed and covered with white hairs on the lower side. The flowers are arranged in heads of between fifteen and twenty that are often clustered together. Each flower has a white and dull gold perianth 39–51 mm (1.5–2.0 in) long and a cream-coloured pistil 37–49 mm (1.5–1.9 in) long. Flowering occurs in August or from December or January to February and only a few egg-shaped follicles, 6–7 mm (0.24–0.28 in) long form.

== Taxonomy and naming ==
This species was first formally described in 1964 by Charles Austin Gardner who gave it the name Dryandra cyanoides and published the description in the Journal of the Royal Society of Western Australia from specimens he collected near Pingelly. In 2007, Austin Mast and Kevin Thiele transferred all the dryandras to the genus Banksia and this species became Banksia cynaroides. The specific epithet (cynaroides) refers to a perceived similarity of this species to those in the thistle-like genus Cynara.

== Distribution and habitat ==
Banksia cynaroides grows in kwongan from Pingelly to Woodanilling.

== Ecology ==
A 2008 assessment of the potential impact of climate change on this species found that it is likely to be driven to extinction by loss of habitat by 2080, even under mild climate change scenarios.

== Conservation status ==
Banksia cynaroides is classified as "Priority Four" by the Government of Western Australia Department of Parks and Wildlife, meaning that is rare or near threatened.
