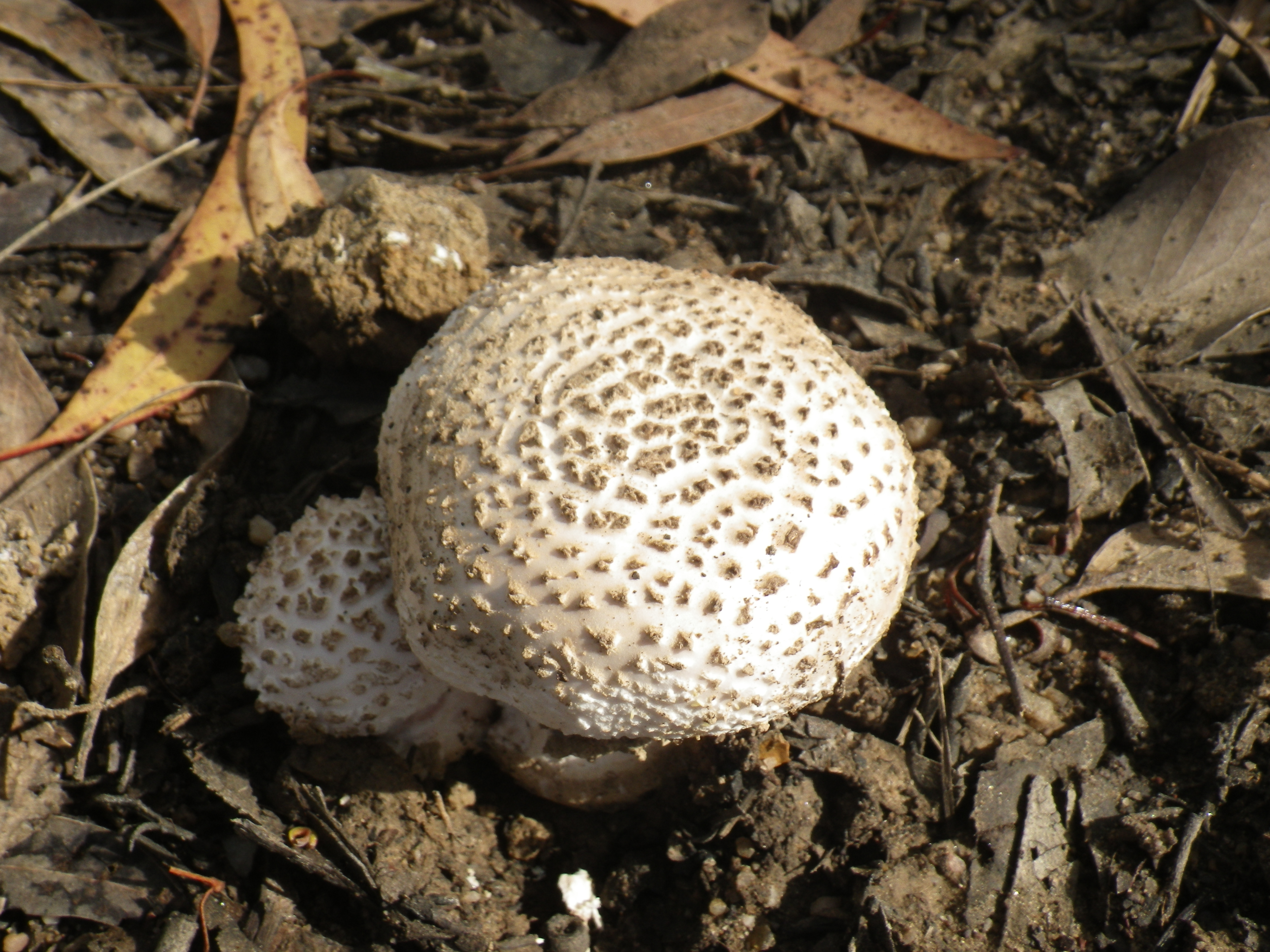

Scientific classification
- Kingdom: Fungi
- Division: Basidiomycota
- Class: Agaricomycetes
- Order: Agaricales
- Family: Amanitaceae
- Genus: Amanita
- Species: A. carneiphylla

Binomial name
- Amanita carneiphylla O.K. Mill. 1992

= Amanita carneiphylla =

Species of fungus

Amanita carneiphylla is a species of Amanita found in Western Australia growing among Eucalyptus, Banksia, and Allocasuarina
