= Acacia semitrullata =

Conservation status
- Priority Four — Rare Taxa (DEC)

Scientific classification
- Kingdom: Plantae
- Clade: Tracheophytes
- Clade: Angiosperms
- Clade: Eudicots
- Clade: Rosids
- Order: Fabales
- Family: Fabaceae
- Subfamily: Caesalpinioideae
- Clade: Mimosoid clade
- Genus: Acacia
- Species: A. semitrullata

Binomial name
- Acacia semitrullata Maslin
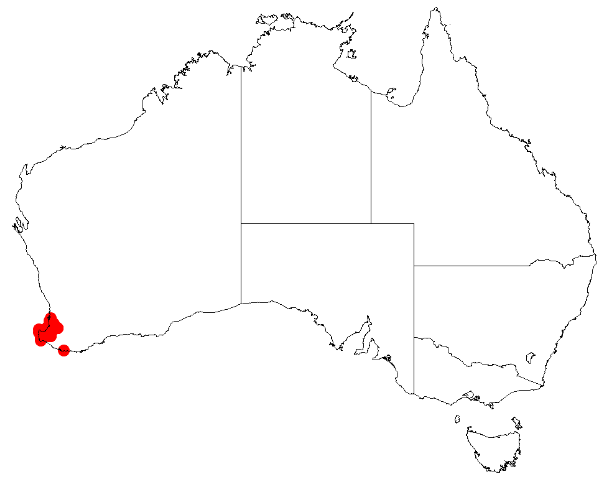
- Occurrence data from AVH

Species of legume

Acacia semitrullata is a shrub of the genus Acacia and the subgenus Phyllodineae that is endemic to south western Australia.

== Description ==
The slender, erect and pungent shrub typically grows to a height of 0.2 to 0.7 metres (0.7 to 2.3 ft). It has orange-brown coloured branches and hairy branchlets with narrowly triangular stipules that are 1 to 2 mm (0.039 to 0.079 in) in length that are incurved. Like most species of Acacia it has phyllodes rather than true leaves. The patent and occasionally reflexed, rigid, greem phyllodes have a narrowly semi-trullate shape with a length of 5 to 10 mm (0.20 to 0.39 in) and a width of 1.3 to 2 mm (0.051 to 0.079 in) with a prominent midrib. It blooms from May to October and produces cream-white flowers.

== Taxonomy ==
The species was first formally described by the botanist Bruce Maslin in 1978 as part of the work Studies in the genus Acacia. A revision of the Uninerves - Triangulares in the journal Nuytsia. It was reclassified as Racosperma semitrullatum by Leslie Pedley in 2003 then transferred back to genus Acacia in 2006.

== Distribution ==
It is native to a small area in the South West region of Western Australia where it is commonly situated on sandplains or in swampy areas growing in clay or sandy soils, sometimes over laterite. the range of the shrub extends from around Yarloop in the north down to around Collie and the Whicher Range in the south where it found growing in open heathland surrounding swamps in open jarrah forest communities.

== See also ==
- List of Acacia species
