= Acacia deflexa =

Conservation status
- Priority Three — Poorly Known Taxa (DEC)

Scientific classification
- Kingdom: Plantae
- Clade: Tracheophytes
- Clade: Angiosperms
- Clade: Eudicots
- Clade: Rosids
- Order: Fabales
- Family: Fabaceae
- Subfamily: Caesalpinioideae
- Clade: Mimosoid clade
- Genus: Acacia
- Species: A. deflexa

Binomial name
- Acacia deflexa Maiden & Blakley
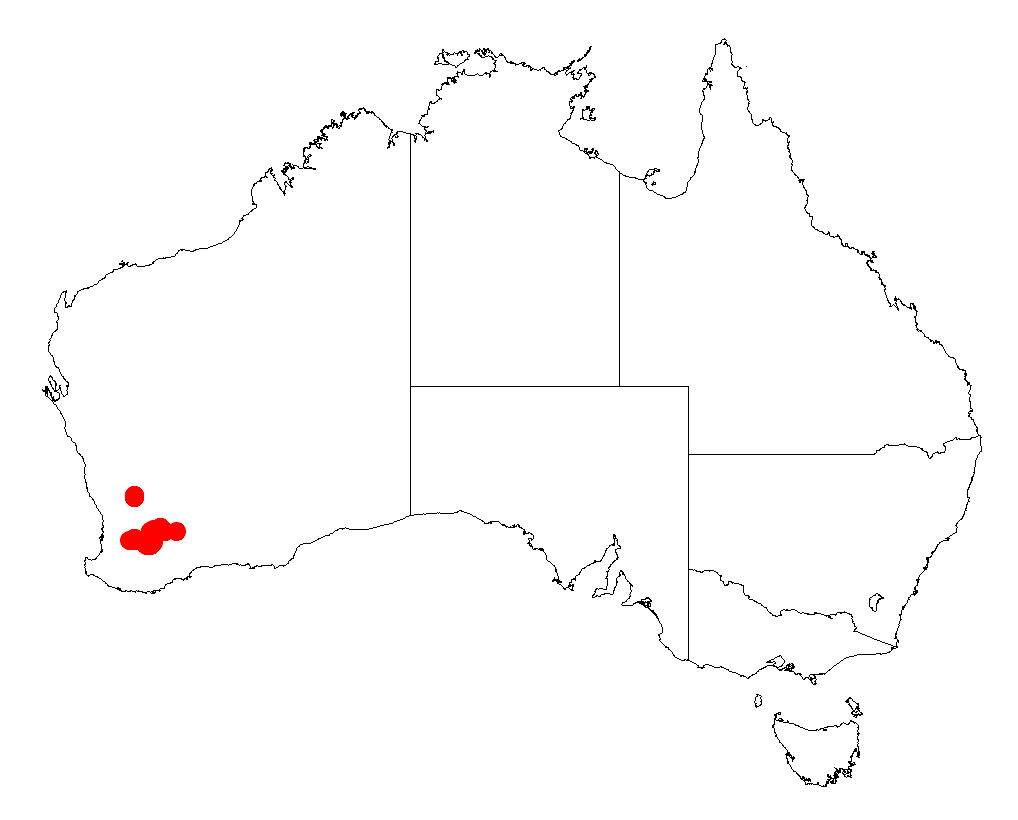
- Occurrence data from AVH

Synonyms
- Racosperma deflexum (Maiden & Blakely) Pedley

Species of legume

Acacia deflexa is a species of flowering plant in the family Fabaceae and is endemic to the south-west of Western Australia. It is a shrub with broadly elliptic, elliptic or narrowly oblong phyllodes, spherical heads of pale golden yellow flowers and linear, strongly curved, papery pods.

== Description ==
Acacia deflexa is a prostrate to straggling or erect shrub that typically grows to a height of 0.15–2 m (6 in – 6 ft 7 in) and has branchlets covered with soft hairs. Its phyllodes are broadly elliptic or elliptic to narrowly oblong, straight or slightly curved, 6–18 mm (0.24–0.71 in) long, 2–5 mm (0.079–0.197 in) wide and leathery with three prominent veins on each face. The flowers are borne in two spherical heads in axils on a peduncle 3.5–5 mm (0.14–0.20 in) long, each head 3.0–3.5 mm (0.12–0.14 in) in diameter with 10 to 16 pale golden yellow flowers. Flowering occurs in August and September, and the pods are linear, strongly curved, up to 45 mm (1.8 in) long, 2.0–2.5 mm (0.079–0.098 in) wide, papery and raised over the seeds. The seeds are broadly elliptic, 2.0–2.5 mm (0.079–0.098 in) long and dull brown, with an aril.

== Taxonomy ==
Acacia deflexa was first formally described in 1927 by Joseph Maiden and William Blakely in the Journal of the Royal Society of Western Australia from specimens collected near Bendering in 1923 by Charles Gardner. The specific epithet (deflexa) means 'bent' or 'turned downwards', referring to the phyllodes.

== Distribution and habitat ==
This species of wattle grows in heath and low scrub in sand or sandy loam on open plains in the Bendering-Ardath, Cuballing-Harrismith and Manmanning areas in the Avon Wheatbelt, Jarrah Forest and Mallee bioregions of south-western Western Australia.

== Conservation status ==
Acacia deflexa is listed as "Priority Three" by the Government of Western Australia Department of Biodiversity, Conservation and Attractions, meaning that it is poorly known and known from only a few locations but is not under imminent threat.

== See also ==
- List of Acacia species
