= Karroun Hill Nature Reserve =

Nature reserve in Western Australia

- IUCN category Ia (strict nature reserve)
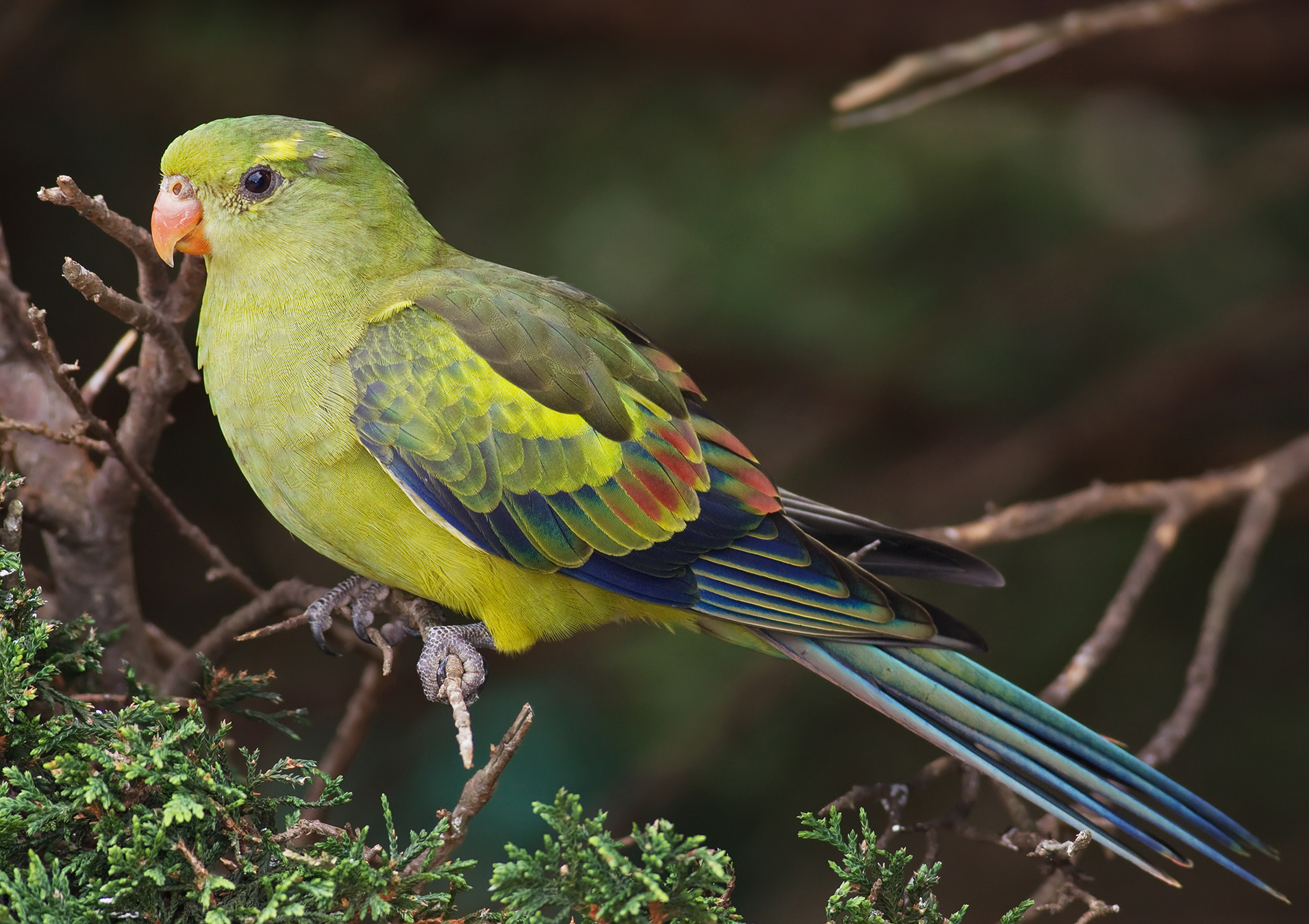
- The reserve is an important site for regent parrots

- Location within Western Australia
- Location: Western Australia
- Coordinates: 29°59′11″S 118°13′23″E
- Area: 309,648 ha (1,195.56 sq mi)
- Established: 1983
- Governing body: Department of Biodiversity, Conservation and Attractions

The Karroun Hill Nature Reserve is a 3,097-square-kilometre (1,196 sq mi) nature reserve in the Mid West region of Western Australia, about 310 kilometres (190 mi) north-east of Perth.

== Description ==
The reserve lies at an altitude of 300–480 metres (980–1,570 ft) above sea level in pastoral farming country. It possesses extensive areas of intact woodland and shrubland lost from much of the adjacent Western Australian wheatbelt through clearing for agriculture. The mulga-eucalypt line crosses the reserve, delineating the boundary between arid wattle-dominated, and temperate eucalypt-dominated, botanical regions. The vegetation consists mainly of York and salmon gum woodlands and dense Acacia thickets.

== Birds ==
The land protected by the reserve has been identified by BirdLife International as an Important Bird Area (IBA) because it supports populations of the vulnerable malleefowl, regent parrots, rufous treecreepers, and western yellow robins.
