= Boyagin Rock =

Rock outcrop in Western Australia

Coordinates: 32°28′09″S 116°52′53″E

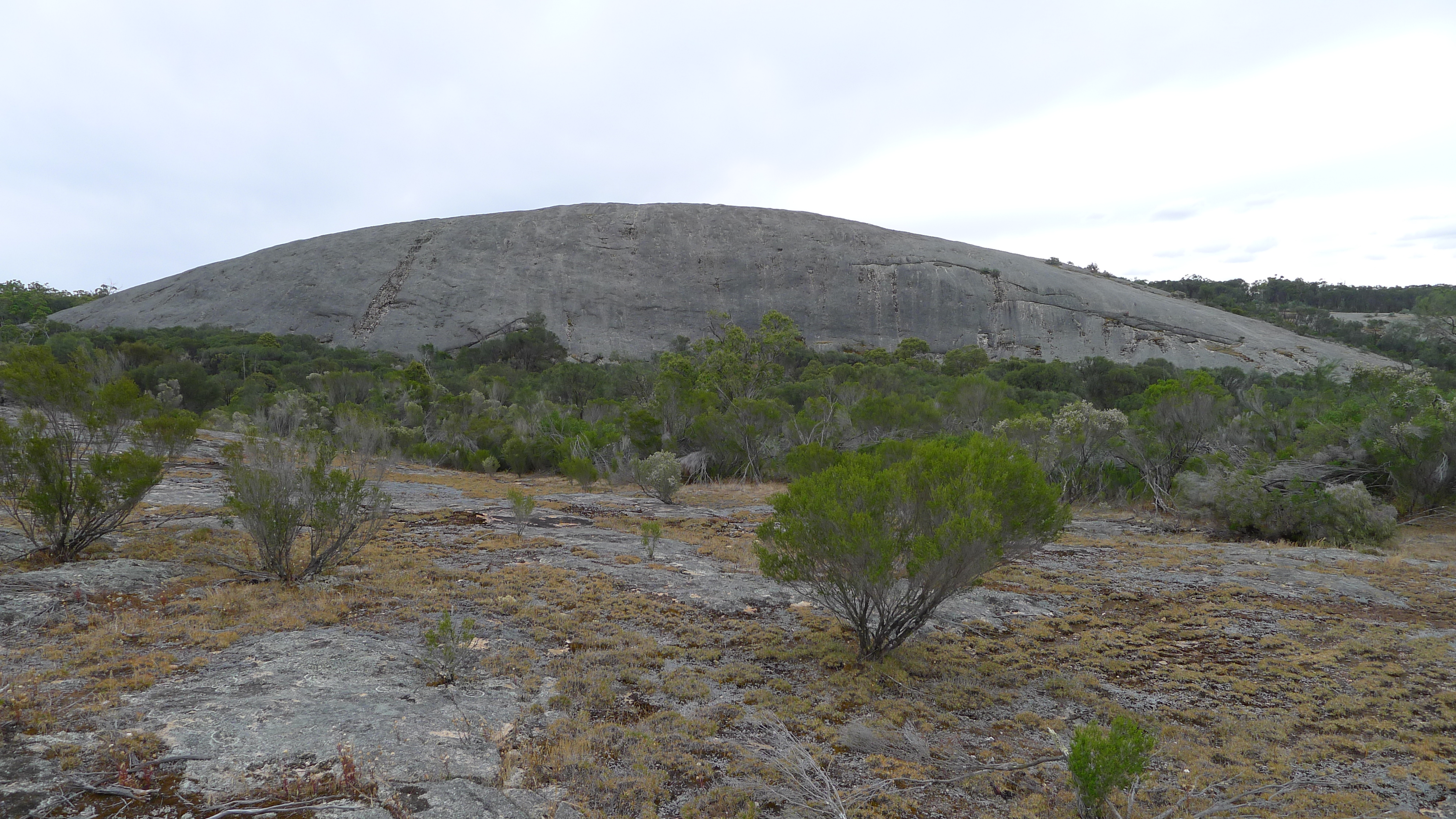
Boyagin Rock in 2011

Boyagin Rock is located 10 km (6.2 mi) south west of Brookton and 26 km (16 mi) north west of Pingelly in the Wheatbelt region of Western Australia, which is approximately 175 km (109 mi) south east of Perth. The Boyagin Rock outcrop rises 50 m (160 ft) above the surrounding land and is an crestal area of a granite inselberg within the geological Yilgarn craton framework.

It was a location that had been looked at for a water reserve, but the proposal was not proceeded with. It had also been viewed as a mining location. The Boyagin Nature Reserve contains Boyagin Rock, and is widely recognised as one of the few areas of intact original fauna and flora in the Avon Wheatbelt bioregion. It provides refuge for a variety of fauna including numbats, goannas, echidnas and tammar wallabies. The reserve was established in 1978, and covers an area of 1.21 km^{2} (0.47 sq mi).

== Traditional owners significance ==
Boyagin Rock is a Ballardong Noongar site of significance. The name is derived from the Noongar words boya ('rock') and djinning ('looking', 'seeing'); it is the "rock that sees or is looking".

A traditional story of how the rock came to be is from Noongar elder Janet Collard, who said that her husband (Andy Collard) told the story of how a big Wagyl (dreamtime water snake) wound itself round and round to form the rock, and it is the last resting place of the Wagyl. Elder Cliff Humphries also spoke of the Wagyl, who would during the time of creation travel from places including Boyagin Rock. Len Collard, through his research with elders of the area, was told that calling out the name of the Wagyl at this location will bring the rains. Another belief is that if you walk to the top of the outcrop without stopping you will have a long life.

== See also ==
- Granite outcrops of Western Australia
