= 2001 Bellevue hazardous waste fire =

Industrial accident in Western Australia

- Date: 15 February 2001
- Time: 23:00 AWST
- Location: Bellevue, Western Australia, Australia; 31.902363°S 116.01912°E
- Cause: Unknown, explosion
- Deaths: 0
- Injuries: 130

The 2001 Bellevue hazardous waste fire was a major industrial fire which began in Bellevue, a suburb of the City of Swan, Perth, Western Australia, on 15 February 2001. Although the fire remained contained to a small area of 5.4 acres, a large toxic plume was emitted as an estimated 500,000 litres of toxic waste exploded and burned, the smoke and ash covering large parts of Perth. The fire was finally extinguished two days later. It remains the worst fire involving hazardous waste in Western Australia.

The property was owned by Waste Control Pty Ltd, trading as Hazardous Waste Solutions, and was forced into liquidation by order of the Supreme Court of Western Australia in October 2001. The initial clean-up operation cost $5.6 million, remediation is on-going as of June 2026; remaining classed as "Contaminated - restricted use" under the Contaminated Sites Act 2003.

Along with soil and groundwater contamination caused by improper processing and storage, the use of over 2 million litres of water by firefighting efforts in response to the fire caused further contamination to the Leederville Aquifer (regional groundwater) and the Helena River, as well as neighbouring blocks of land bordering Roe Highway.

== Background ==
The site the fire occurred on comprised Lot 88 (Oliver Street) and 99 (1 Bulbey Street, the main frontage) in Bellevue in the City of Swan, close to the council border with the Shire of Mundaring, in an area zoned for general industry. The property first came into use for the processing of industrial waste in 1987 when Austech Australia Pty Ltd, trading as Australian Chemical and Solvent Recycling (ACSR) acquired Lot 99, Lot 88 only coming into use around 1992, initially as a carpark. Initially, an unsealed portion of Irwin Street separated the two lots, before it was closed and divided between them, this would become severely contaminated later.

The state government used and promoted the recycling plant itself under its Chem Collect program, where the government collected pesticides and herbicides and sent them to the site, being one of only two sites licensed to store and recycle a vast variety of industrial chemicals and solvents. In 1994, by which point Hazardous Waste Solutions leased part of the site, the Liberal-National Coalition government under Richard Court was served a safety notice. But this did not reach court until April 2001.

In 1995 three sumps in an area where solvent was processed were removed due to potential sub-surface contamination. The following year Hazardous Waste Solutions purchased the site, with a drum crusher installed the same year. Before the fire it was alleged that the company failed to provide an inventory of the material stored on-site, failed to rectify leaking containers, and was operating premises which lacked adequate facilities that could contain leaks. Most of the chemicals being stored were solvents from the motor vehicle and dry cleaning industries, the business distilled solvents for resale (recycling plant) and acted as a waste transfer station.

On 16 September 1999, under Minister of Environment, Cheryl Edwardes, the Government of Western Australia published The Govt. has moved quickly to avert a potentially hazardous environmental situation, where it was noted that the site might have already contaminated regional groundwater. Not wanting to spend $1 million in estimated rehabilitation costs, the Government instead reimbursed Hazardous Waste Solutions $100,000 to keep the business open, still receiving waste. Edwardes later admitted "It was the cheapest option..." This 1999 notice also included an order for the removal of 1000 drums for violating Section 73 of the Environmental Protection Act 1986, which had only been triggered once before on another site at Wongan Hills.

The Auditor-General, Des Pearson tabled a report in October 2000, finding the site to be woefully inadequate for handling hazardous chemicals, with clear violations of the regulations surrounding explosives and dangerous goods.

In December 2000, Hazardous Waste Solutions was charged by the Western Australian Department of Mines and Energy with breaching the Explosives and Dangerous Goods (Dangerous Goods Handling and Storage) Regulations 1992 ten times. Following the fire, the owner of the business, Dr. Jeffrey Claflin, paid $200,000 in fines following a decision in June 2001. Dr. Claflin requested the magistrate fine him the maximum amount applicable.

== Fire ==
Close to midnight on February 15, 2001, a fire on 1 Bulbey Street began, reportedly due to an explosion. The recycling plant was engulfed in flames reaching over 1200 °C, as the 2000 drums stored on the site caught fire and began combusting, with some drums flying up to 400 m (1,300 ft). The initial response came from the Stoneville Volunteer Bushfire Brigade at around 5 am, who were told it was merely a bushfire, before the Fire and Emergency Services Authority (FESA) (precursor to DFES) responded to the fire. A red canister on the front gate was supposed to contain a list of all chemicals stored on-site, but it was empty. Hence, the firefighters used water instead of foam, spreading the chemicals further. Firefighters were forced to consult a local environmentalist, Lee Bell, who had compiled a list of chemicals he was able to read off the drums through the fence months earlier. The Western Australian Department of Environmental Protection had no details regarding what was stored on the site, nor did it provide any information to the City of Swan. Over 350 personnel responded to the emergency and 50 civilians were evacuated, with the blaze finally extinguished on 17 February. The fire burnt through bushland up to the Helena River, 400 metres away, and destroyed several surrounding buildings such as the offices of the Midland Bus Company. Several firefighters were hospitalised and reported nosebleeds and vomiting. The large volumes of water, over 2 million litres, caused the chemicals to mix together and pool on the site, including the neighbouring Lot 2 owned by Main Roads Western Australia at the time. Most of the stored drums were moved onto Lot 2, further contaminating the surrounding properties.

== Aftermath ==
The fire occurred just five days after the 2001 state election, resulting in a Labor victory under Geoff Gallop, an inquiry into the fire was announced on 2 May 2001, the Gallop ministry only having been sworn-in a day after the fire occurred. The Bellevue Hazardous Waste Fire Inquiry, chaired by Tony McRae, by the Economics and Industry Standing Committee of the Western Australian Parliament was formed in June 2001 on the advice of the Minister for the Environment and Heritage, Dr. Judy Edwards, with John Day as Deputy Chairperson, and John Bowler, Bernie Masters, and Mick Murray as Committee Members. When testifying to the inquiry, owner of Hazardous Waste Solutions, Dr. Claflin, freely admitted to breaking regulations, claiming he couldn't afford the cost, with improper bunding causing toxic spillage at least once, this was later found to be a regular occurrence during rainfall, with waste spilling onto the street and seeping into storm water drains leading to the Helena River, a tributary of the Swan River. Dr. Claflin, whom was also national treasurer of the Waste Management Association of Australia since 1991, blamed the 'uneducated industry' for not being forced to comply with government regulation, resulting in lower revenue for his business, which he gave as the explanation for why he hadn't followed regulations himself. The inquiry examined further evidence in April 2003.

=== Investigation ===
The exact cause of the fire has never been determined due to the destruction of evidence by the fire itself and the necessary clean-up operations that preceded immediately after, Western Australian Police did initially suspect arson, but nobody was charged. Cleanaway Technical Services (CTS) were contracted to do the immediate clean-up, removing and draining sumps, removing burnt-out equipment and drums, excavating and covering soil moved by contaminated water from the firefighting, with several areas filled with clean sand from Gnangara. URS Australia were contracted to do a preliminary investigation into contamination on the site, their final report releasing in early 2002.

A former employee of Hazardous Waste Solutions, Brian Blair told Four Corners that many things were unlabelled, saying of one incident that after pumping an unknown acid to neutralise some chemicals in a tank the aluminium fittings began to be corroded by the acid causing pipework to leak and spray in various places. According to Blair these incidents were not uncommon.

An independent review also found that the Western Australian Department of Environmental Protection (DEP), and the Western Australian Department of Minerals and Energy (DME) both continued to issue licences to Hazardous Waste Solutions despite knowledge of various breaches. Hazardous waste began stockpiling due to new landfill disposal rules preventing Hazardous Waste Solutions from using the Red Hill waste facility, causing a huge backlog of materials. Both DEP and DME kept the deplorable facility open out of fear that shutting it down would lead to an upswing in illegal dumping, and waste accumulation at hospitals and universities.

The lack of site documentation led to fire crews using water and endangered them, with the incident not declared a HAZMAT incident until eight hours after the fire began, with many volunteer fire fighters responding without appropriate PPE. Evacuations by police were only based on physical proximity to the fire, and not in the direction of the smoke plume. The Western Australian Department of Health had zero knowledge of the site before the fire and when recommending residents to evacuate was contradicted by the Incident Controller who ignored the Department's advice. Leading to residents returning while the area was still unsafe. Clean-up crews were not provided with protective clothing until four days after the fire, community concern was also directed at the fact that the Bellevue Primary School just 500 metres away remained open following the fire before storm water drains were cleaned.

=== Contamination and health impacts ===
The investigation found particularly odorous and stained soil in the former unsealed road and in areas where underground storage tanks had formerly been located (each with a capacity of 4,000 L (1,100 US gal). The shallow local groundwater, 3.5 m (11 ft) below the surface was severely contaminated, with chemicals found to be seeping up to 9.5 m (31 ft) down into the regional water table, the groundwater plumes migrating across four other properties.

A huge variety of monocyclic aromatic hydrocarbons, volatile organic compounds, and heavy metals were found to have contaminated the site. With hydrocarbons including toluene, phenols, and particularly high amounts of xylene, along with chlorinated solvents such as perchloroethene, trichloroethene, trichloroethane, and cis-1,2-dichloroethene, and other chemicals like methyl ethyl ketone, methyl isobutyl ketone, chloroform, acetophenone, and isophorone found across the site. Heavy metals, including nickel, lead, chromium, and cadmium were found in elevated, but albeit minor concentrations. The business owner, Dr. Claflin, alleged that a 70 litre drum containing mercury had been breached and spilt during the clean-up operations, but CTS denied the claim and no mercury was detected by URS Australia.

No immediate risk to the general public was noted by URS Australia, the biggest risk being contact and inhalation of carcinogenic chemicals, particularly through toxic dust coming in contact with labourers and other employees working on surrounding industrial sites as well as local residents living in the immediate area. The biggest concern noted was a potential contamination of the Leederville Formation Aquifer, which provides fresh drinking water for large parts of the Metropolitan Region, this remains a concern along with contamination of the Helena River.

The Bellevue Health Surveillance register was established by the Western Australian Department of Health to track symptoms and illnesses across Bellevue, with residents reporting of vomiting, nausea, nosebleeds, and headaches. A 2013 study endorsed by the Government of Western Australia dismissed claims that the fire had led to an increase in cancer cases in the surrounding area, finding that of the three people who died within seven years of registering, they most likely died of causes unrelated to the incident.

=== Legal proceedings ===
Dr. Jeffrey Claflin, General Manager of Hazardous Waste Solutions was charged by the Department of Environmental Protection on 5 March 2002, for failing to keep inventory, failure to seal leaking containers, and improper handling of hazardous waste susceptible to leakage; each charge carrying a maximum penalty of $62,500 under the Explosives and Dangerous Goods Act 1961.

In 2003 the Brookdale Liquid Waste Treatment Facility was exposed by The Sunday Times for similar breaches.

== Remediation ==
It wasn't until 2009 that the Western Australian Department of Water and Environmental Regulations (DWER) publicly revealed that trichlorethene was leaking into the Helena River.

Minister for Environment Donna Faragher announced in March 2010, the construction of an underground barrier at the site costing $3 million, filtering contaminated groundwater. The structure comprises two 11 m (36 ft) deep trenches parallel to one another, each 76 m (249 ft) long, filled with materials such as sawdust, sand, and sand-iron mixture. The scheme was criticised for only addressing certain contaminants.

In 2013 it was estimated that it would take between 10 and 15 years for the contaminated groundwater (the plume) to reach the Helena River.

As of 2017 over $14 million had been spent on remediation efforts to slow the plume from reaching the Helena River.

Between December 2006 and June 2018 up to 50% of the DWER's Contaminated Sites Management Account (CSMA) was allocated solely to the Bellevue site, more than any other site during that period, including Wittenoom.

== See also ==
- List of environmental issues in Western Australia
- Environmental issues in Australia
