= Ivernia =

Ivernia may refer to:

- Land of the Iverni, in southwest Ireland
  - Hibernia, the island of Ireland
- SS Ivernia, liner launched 1899, torpedoed 1917
- RMS Ivernia, liner launched 1954, scrapped 2004; a.k.a. RMS Franconia, SS Feodor Shalyapin
- British Rail Class 40 diesel locomotive D221 Ivernia, built by English Electric at Newton-le-Willows, Lancashire
- Ivernia Inc, an Australian mining company
- Ivernia Apartment Building, a historic building in Springfield, Massachusetts
