= List of environmental issues in Western Australia =

This is a list of environmental issues that have resulted in environmental damage in Western Australia, Australia.

== Air and odour pollution ==
- 2006: Caustic dust from Alcoa's Wagerup bauxite refinery blew into Yarloop, the state government initially pursued criminal negligence charges, but the charges were downgraded after Alcoa pled guilty to violating its licence and paid a $45,000 fine as well as $5000 in legal fees. Locals criticised the decision, believing the fine was too low considering the health implications. Alcoa was found to have violated its licence again in 2011, and had been fined $60,000 previously in 2004, both due to the same facility.
- 2019: Air pollution from a Cockburn Cement plant in Munster was found up to 8 kilometres away from the facility, with the company fined $290,000 for six violations of the Environmental Protection Act 1986 in 2023.

== Industrial fires ==
- 2001: A chemical and solvent recycling plant, already under scrutiny for groundwater contamination, exploded resulting in a fire which showered large parts of Perth with toxic smoke and ash, due to improper record keeping firefighters were unaware that the fire involved hazardous chemicals until 8 hours after the fire started. The 2 million litres of water used to extinguish the fire instead of foam caused additional contamination.
- 2001: 1.5 tonnes of fireworks exploded at a warehouse in Carmel, causing shrapnel to fly several kilometres, the Western Australian Department of Mines and Energy, who licenced the site, admitted they were unaware of the chemicals being stored and at what quantity, relying heavily on "industry self-regulation."
- 2004: $200,000 worth of damage was caused in a factory fire at O'Connor, the fire was extinguished within 30 minutes, but required special agents due the presence of acid and molten zinc.
- 2019: One of Western Australia's largest general recycling facilities, located in South Guildford caught fire, forcing 20 local governments to divert household waste to landfills between November 2019 and February 2020, the recycling facility was totally destroyed.
- 2024: Nutrien Ag Solutions storage facility at Kwinana Beach caught fire while unloading a shipment of sulphur, the fire resulted in a large plume of sulphur smoke and disrupted fertiliser supply for local farmers.
- 2026: A fire started at a battery recycling and storage facility in Maddington where 100 tonnes of lithium ion, lithium metal, and lead acid batteries were stored, the fire took several days to put out and caused over $7 million worth of damage, being the worst lithium ion battery fire in Western Australia.

== Soil pollution ==
- 1930s-1966: 3 million tonnes of blue asbestos tailings remain at the former town of Wittenoom, the declared contaminated site is the largest in the southern hemisphere, over 2,000 former workers of Wittenoom have died from asbestos-related diseases, with Western Australia having the highest rates of malignant mesothelioma in Australia, and indigenous Australians in Western Australia facing the highest mortality rate from this cancer in the world.
- 1954-1984: Up to 75,000 tonnes of lead tailings remain around Northampton from the State Battery (stamp mill), with some of the tailings removed by contractors for use as fill material, building foundations, driveways, and gardens. The first reports of adverse health effects came in 1979, as of early 2019 over 17,000 cubic metres of contaminated soil have been removed for specialised storage.
- 2019: The Oasis @ Newman hotel in Newman had eight 1000-litre intermediate bulk containers purposefully punctured and buried 50 metres from the Fortescue River within the Newman public drinking Water Reserve, the hotel complied in excavating the waste and was fined $17,768.30.

== Waste disposal ==
- 1953-1986: Over 840,000 tonnes of toxic waste was improperly disposed of at the Daly Street and Sandown Park dumps in South Fremantle, causing severe contamination from polychlorinated biphenyls and heavy metals.
- 2003: The Brookdale liquid waste treatment facility was forced to close due to suspected contamination and violations of the Environmental Protection Act 1986 similar to the Bellevue recycling plant which exploded in 2001.
- 2004: Two containment cells at the Red Hill waste facility operated by the Eastern Metropolitan Regional Council (EMRC) holding highly toxic "class IV" dangerous goods were breached, leaking organophosphate pesticides into John Forrest National Park.
- 2022: A site in Oldbury was found to be illegally storing 800 tonnes of toxic waste, mainly hydrocarbons, comprising 200 barrels and 500 intermediate bulk containers, with vandalism causing 35,000 litres of liquid waste to leak onto the ground and contaminate the local groundwater. The company, Controlled Waste Disposals, was fined a combined $15,000 and its director, who plead guilty, $21,000.
- 2023: A historic waste dump in-use from the late 1960s to 2012 at Busselton containing toxic waste such as per- and poly-fluoroalkyl substances was first declared contaminated in 2007, with a large toxic plume escaping the dump's boundary by 2017; in 2023 50 properties had restrictions placed on their water usage, 5 properties being told that they couldn't use their water for anything at all, the other 45 were only able use the water for general irrigation.

== Water pollution ==
- 2009: 77 corroded 44-gallon drums were illegally dumped along the Swan River in Burswood, Victoria Park, and Welshpool.

== See also ==
- Contemporary Australian environmental incidents
- Environmental issues in Australia
- Environment of Australia
- List of environmental accidents in the fossil fuel industry in Australia
- Odour pollution in Australia
