= Environmental issues in Australia =

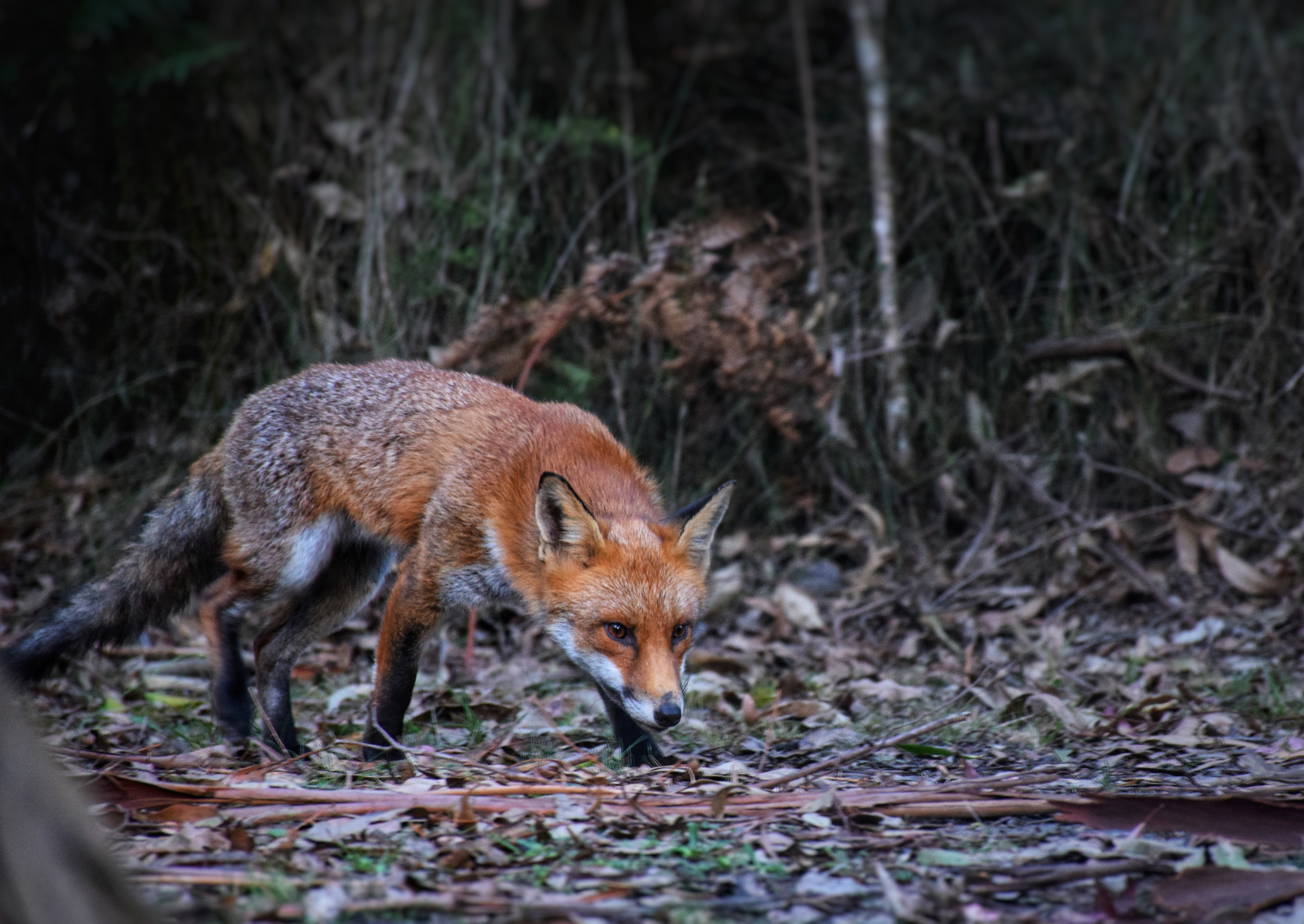
Red foxes are one of many invasive species in Australia that threaten native wildlife.

Environmental issues in Australia describes a number of environmental issues which affect the environment of Australia and are the primary concern of the environmental movement in Australia.

There are a range of such issues, some of the relating to conservation in Australia. Others, for example the deteriorating state of Murray–Darling Basin, have a direct and serious effect on human land use and the economy. Many human activities including the use of natural resources have a direct impact on the Australian environment and its ecology. Additionally Aboriginal culture has a strong connection to the land, with some landscape features considered sacred, and as such environmental damage to Australian Aboriginal sacred sites can also have significant cultural repercussions.

Some of the key issues include: climate change; contamination and pollution; ozone depletion; conservation; invasive species; land degradation; waterway health; urbanisation and mining issues among others.

== Climate change ==
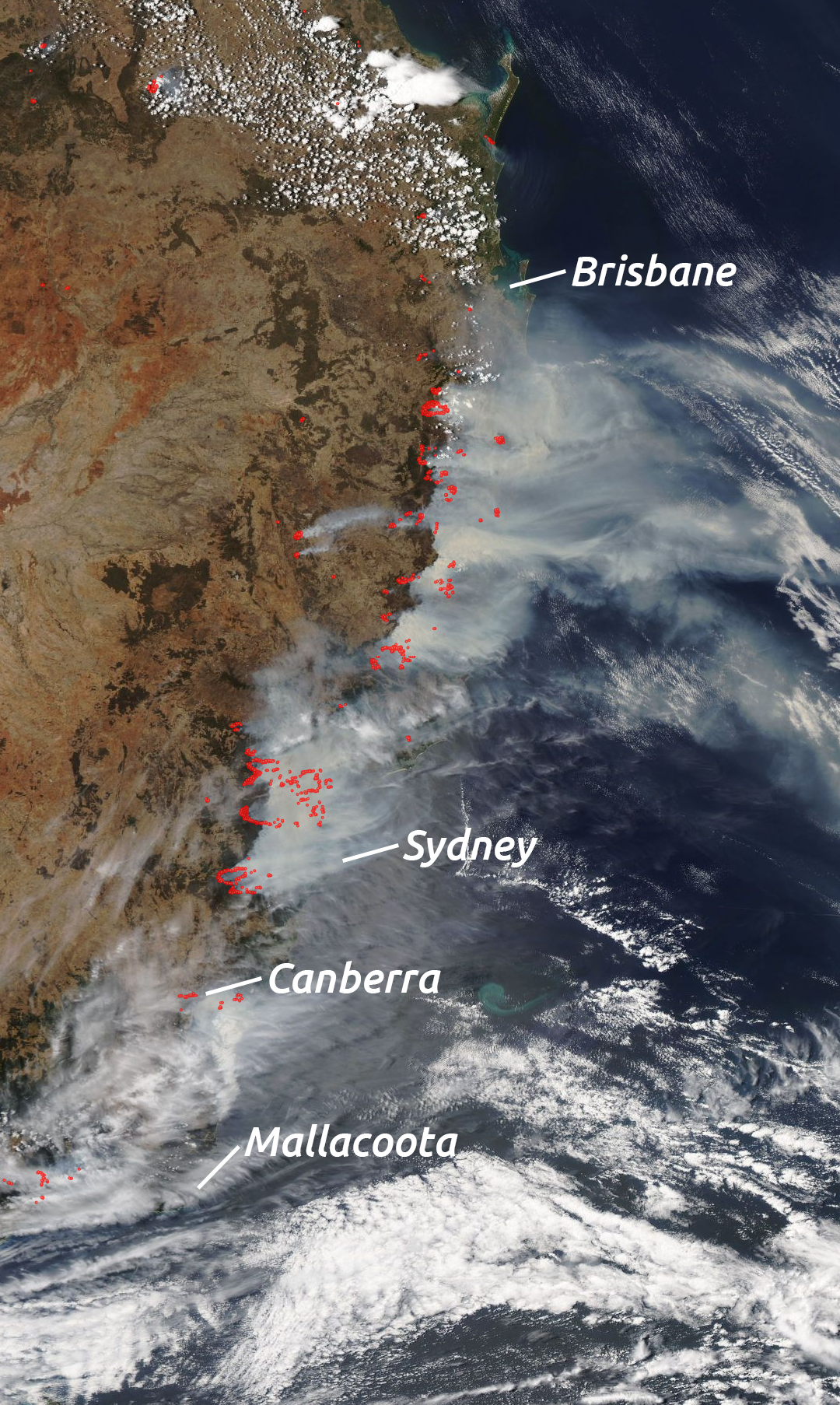
Climate change is increasing the frequency and size of bushfires, as evidenced by the 2019–20 Australian bushfire season.

Climate change has been a critical issue in Australia since the beginning of the 21st century. Australia is becoming hotter and more prone to extreme heat, bushfires, droughts, floods, and longer fire seasons because of climate change. Climate issues include wildfires, heatwaves, cyclones, rising sea levels, and erosion.

Since the beginning of the 20th century, Australia has experienced an increase of over 1.5 °C in average annual temperatures, with warming occurring at twice the rate over the past 50 years compared with the previous 50 years. In 2025, the Australian Government reported "high confidence" that the global temperature rise "will stabilise some" at the increase of 1.5-3 °C. Recent climate events such as extremely high temperatures and widespread drought have focused government and public attention on the effects of climate change in Australia. Rainfall in southwestern Australia has decreased by 10–20% since the 1970s, while southeastern Australia has also experienced a moderate decline since the 1990s. Rainfall is expected to become heavier and more infrequent, as well as more common in summer rather than in winter. Australia's annual average temperatures are projected to increase 0.4–2.0 °C above 1990 levels by the year 2030, and 1–6 °C by 2070. Average precipitation in the southwest and southeast Australia is projected to decline during this time, while regions such as the northwest may experience increases in rainfall.

Climate change is affecting the continent's environment and ecosystems. Australia is vulnerable to the effects of global warming projected for the next 50 to 100 years because of its extensive arid and semi-arid areas, already warm climate, and high annual rainfall variability. The continent's high fire risk increases this susceptibility to changes in temperature and climate. Meanwhile, Australia's coastlines will experience erosion and inundation from an estimated 8–88 centimetres (3.1–34.6 in) increase in global sea level. Australia's unique ecosystems such as the Great Barrier Reef and many animal species are also at risk.

Climate change also has diverse implications for Australia's economy, its agriculture and public health. Projected impacts include more severe floods, droughts, and cyclones. Furthermore, Australia's population is highly concentrated in coastal areas at risk from rising sea levels, and existing pressures on water supply will be exacerbated. The exposure of Indigenous Australians to climate change impacts is exacerbated by existing socio-economic disadvantages which are linked to colonial and post-colonial marginalisation. The communities most affected by climate changes are those in the North where Aboriginal and Torres Strait Islander people make up 30% of the population. Aboriginal and Torres Strait Islander communities located in the coastal north are the most disadvantaged due to social and economic issues and their reliance on traditional land for food, culture, and health. This has raised the question for many community members in these areas, "Should we stay or move away?"

Australia is also a contributor to climate change, with its greenhouse gas emissions per capita above the world average. The country is highly reliant on coal and other fossil fuels, although renewable energy coverage is increasing. National climate change mitigation efforts include a commitment to achieving net zero emissions by 2050 under the Paris Agreement, although Australia has repeatedly ranked poorly in the Climate Change Performance Index and other international rankings for its climate targets and implementation. Climate change adaptation can be performed at national and local levels and was identified as a priority for Australia in the 2007 Garnaut Review.

Climate change has been a divisive or politicised issue in Australian politics since the 2000s, contributing to successive governments implementing and repealing mitigation policies such as carbon pricing. Some Australian media outlets have promoted climate misinformation. The issue has sparked protests in support of climate change policies, including some of the largest demonstrations and school strikes in Australia's history.

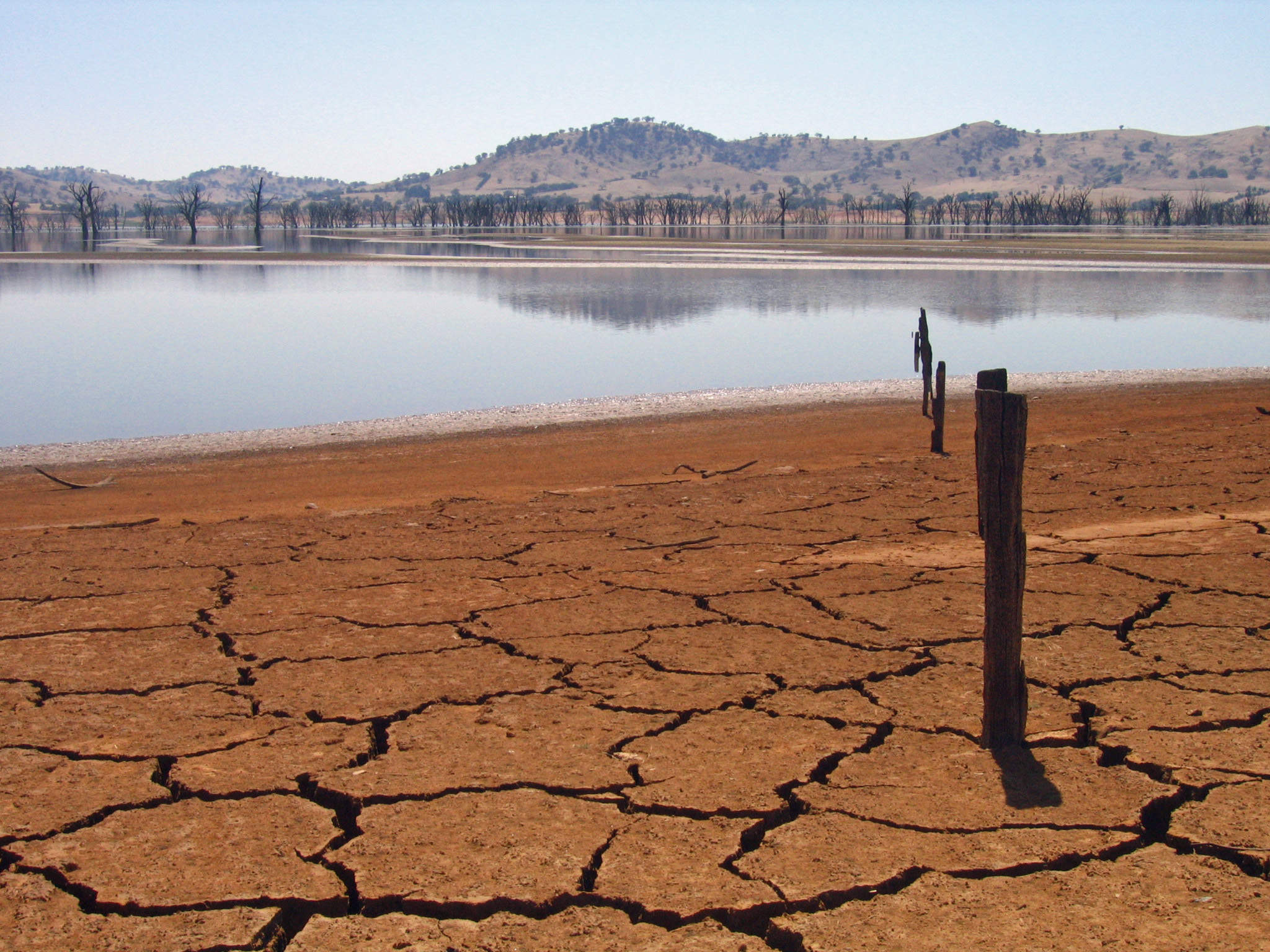
Effect of 2000s Australian drought, the worst since European settlement, on Lake Hume in 2007. According to the Bureau of Meteorology this drought was exacerbated by Climate change.

=== Attribution, Public concerns and Emissions reduction ===
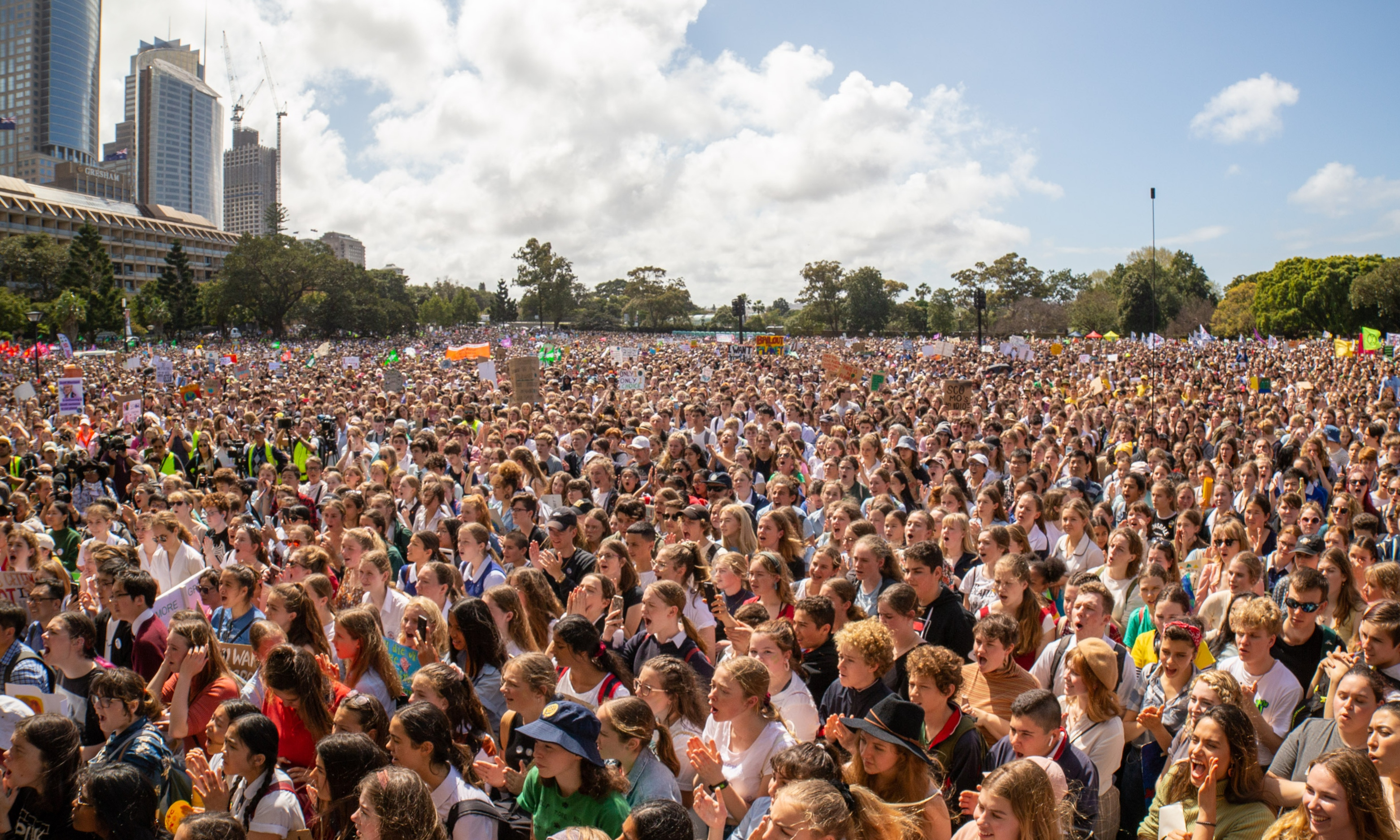
The September 2019 climate strike in Sydney. The protests were among the largest in Australian history.

Australia ranks within the top ten countries globally with respect to greenhouse gas emissions per capita.

The current federal and state governments have all publicly stated their belief that climate change is being caused by anthropogenic greenhouse gas emissions. Vocal minority groups within the population campaign against mining and coal-fired power stations in Australia, and such demonstrations are widely reported by the mainstream media. Similarly, vocal minority groups concurrently oppose wind energy schemes, despite being 'carbon neutral', on the grounds of local visual and noise impact and concern for the currently high cost and low reliability of wind energy.

Despite the publication of the Garnaut report and the Green Paper on the proposed Carbon Pollution Reduction Scheme, public belief in anthropogenic climate change has noticeably eroded following the leaking of e-mails from the University of East Anglia's Climate Research Unit. Nevertheless, recent climate events such as extremely high temperatures and widespread drought have focused government and public attention on the effects.

There is claimed to be a net benefit to Australia in stabilising greenhouse gases in the atmosphere at 450ppm CO_{2} eq in line with the prevailing political stance. Public disagreement with this opinion is generally dismissed as expression of vested interests, for example from the coal industry.

=== Energy use ===
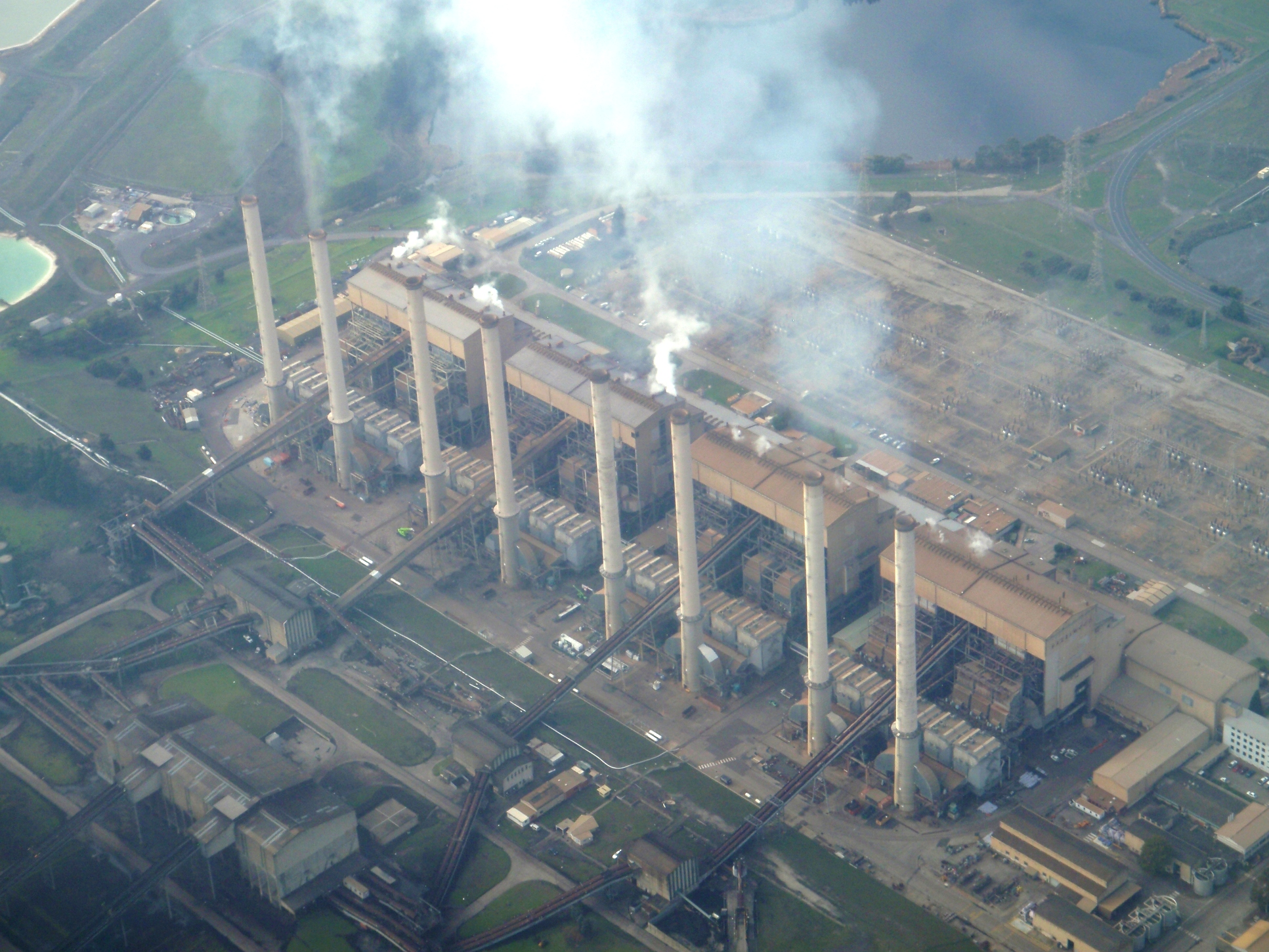
Decommissioned in 2017, Victoria's Hazelwood Power Station was one of the world's most environmentally damaging power stations, responsible for more than 3% of Australia's greenhouse gas emissions.

Most of Australia's demand for electricity depends upon coal-fired thermal generation, owing to the plentiful indigenous coal supply, limited potential electric generation and political unwillingness to exploit indigenous uranium resources (although Australia accounted for the world's second highest production of uranium in 2005 to fuel a 'carbon neutral' domestic nuclear energy program.

Australia does not require its vehicles to meet any fuel efficiency standards, in spite of its emissions reduction target under the Paris Agreement.

== Contamination and pollution ==
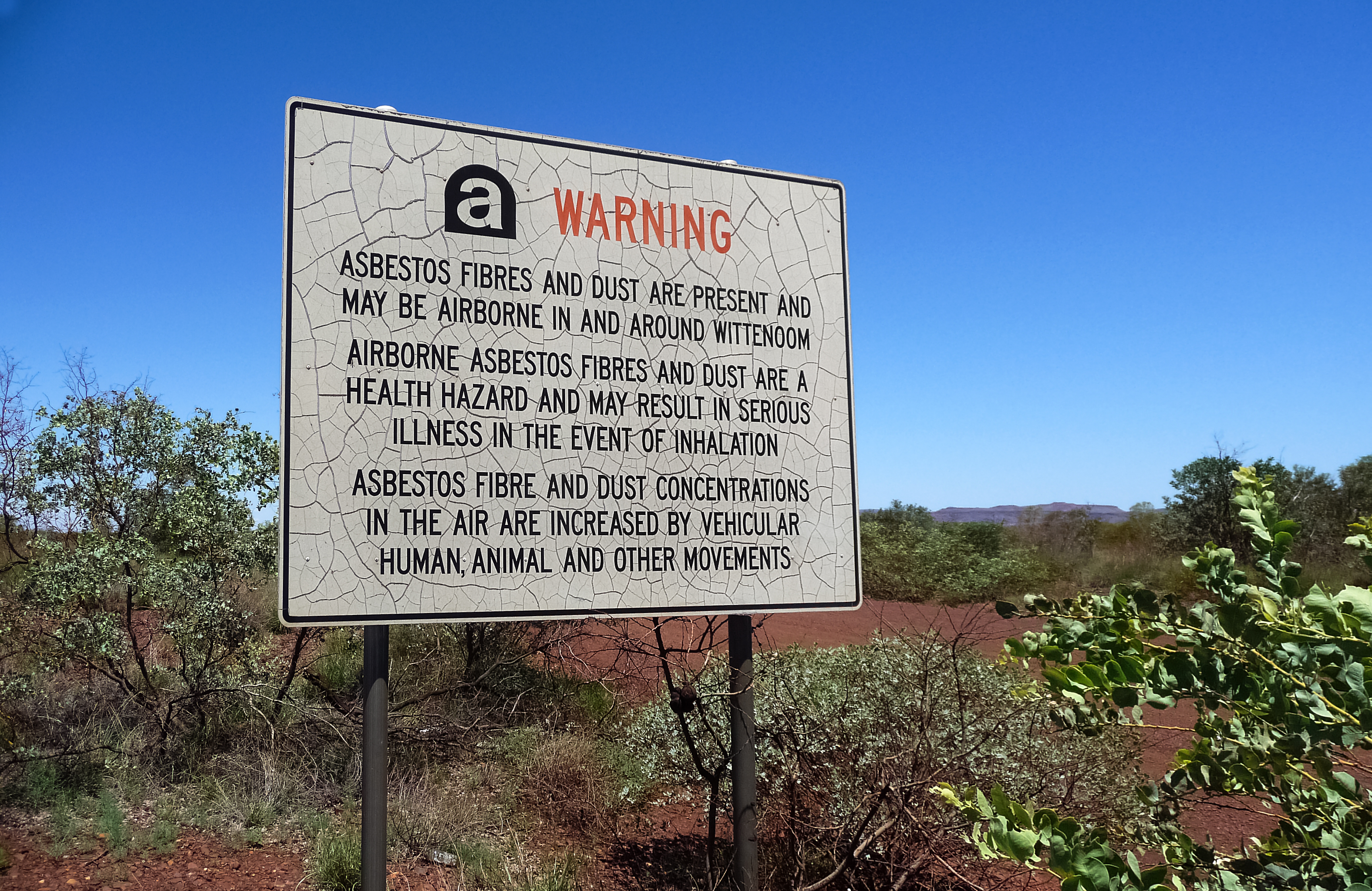
Government warning sign at the 50,000 hectare Wittenoom Asbestos Management Area, the largest contaminated site in the southern hemisphere. Contamination from mining operations by toxic materials including asbestos, is a major environmental problem in Australia.

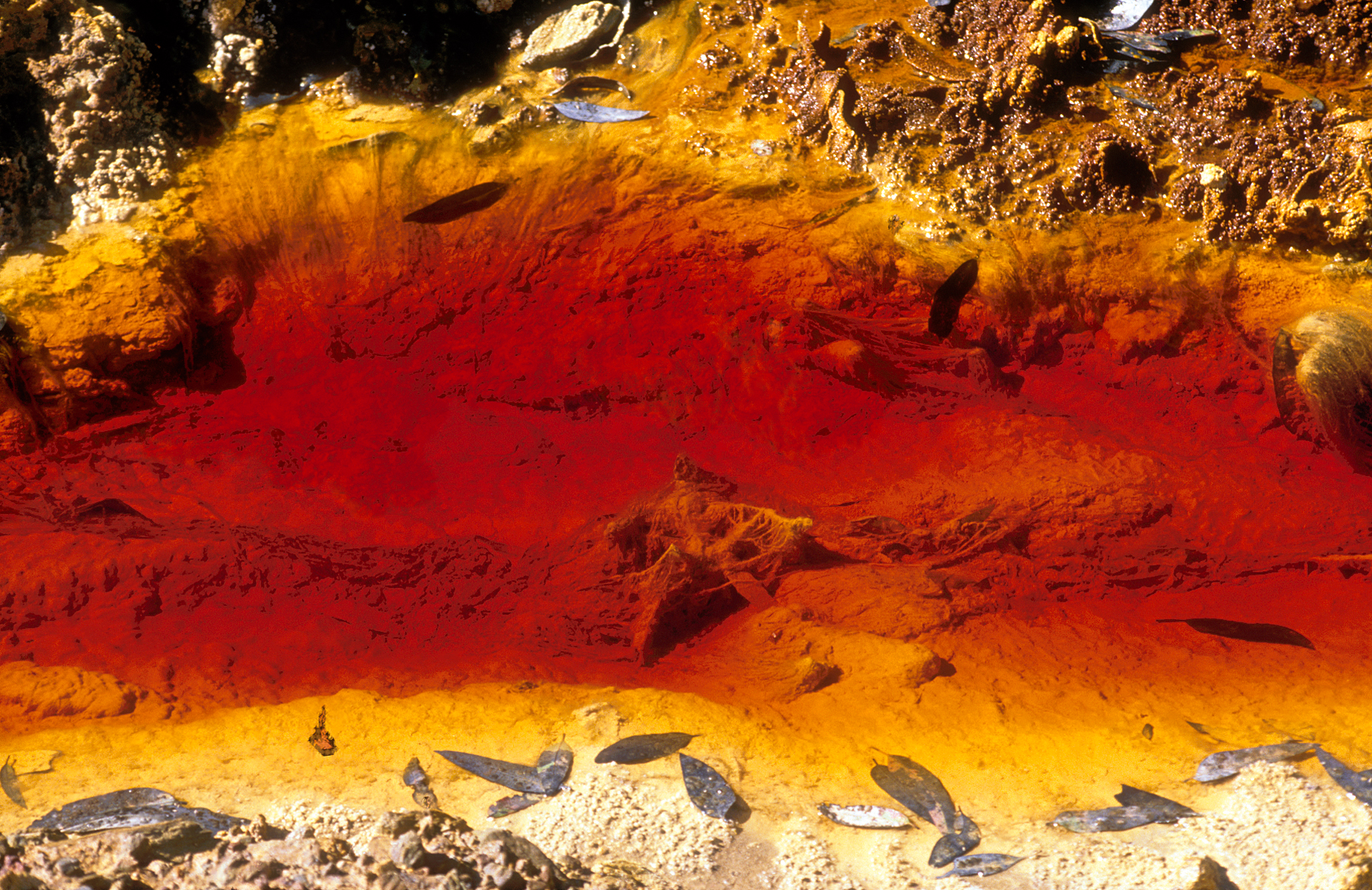
Stream pollution near mining operations in the Mount Lofty Ranges, South Australia

Australia is affected by significant contamination and pollution including soil and groundwater contamination as well as water and air pollution. Researchers currently estimate that between 16,000 and 80,000 significantly sites have been identified as affected by up to 7,500 different contaminants. Some of these are toxic byproducts of government land use and private industry. The country has several notable exclusion zones due to heavy contamination. Some substances have significant half-lifes, making remediation and sequestering expensive and complicated. There is also a serious ongoing risk of contamination incidents particularly from mining-related activities.

Significant types of contamination affecting Australia include:

- plastics – Australia produces 2.5m tonnes of plastic per year, about 84% is sent to landfill. Estimated 130,000 tonnes of plastic waste leaks into the environment annually.
- hydrocarbons – more than 16,000 significant sites
- herbicides and pesticides – more than 3,500 significant sites identified
- heavy metals – including lead, arsenic, cadmium and mercury across thousands of significant urban and remote sites
- radioactive elements in soils and radioactive waste – more than 100 significant sites including large exclusion zones due to high radiation levels from nuclear fallout, high risk of nuclear contamination due to a significant nuclear element mining industry, more than 5000 cubic metres of radioactive waste which requires long term safe handling, more than 46 cubic metres generated each year
- per- and polyfluoroalkyl substances (PFAS) – more than 90 significant sites identified requiring remediation particularly government training centres and surrounding catchments from use of fire fighting foams
- asbestos – over 6.2 million tonnes across more than 50 significant major urban sites and several exclusion zones in remote locations
- landfill leachate
- diesel exhaust and wood smoke persisting for long periods in ambient air in both urban areas and remote locations contribute to 4,880 premature deaths every year

== Ozone depletion ==
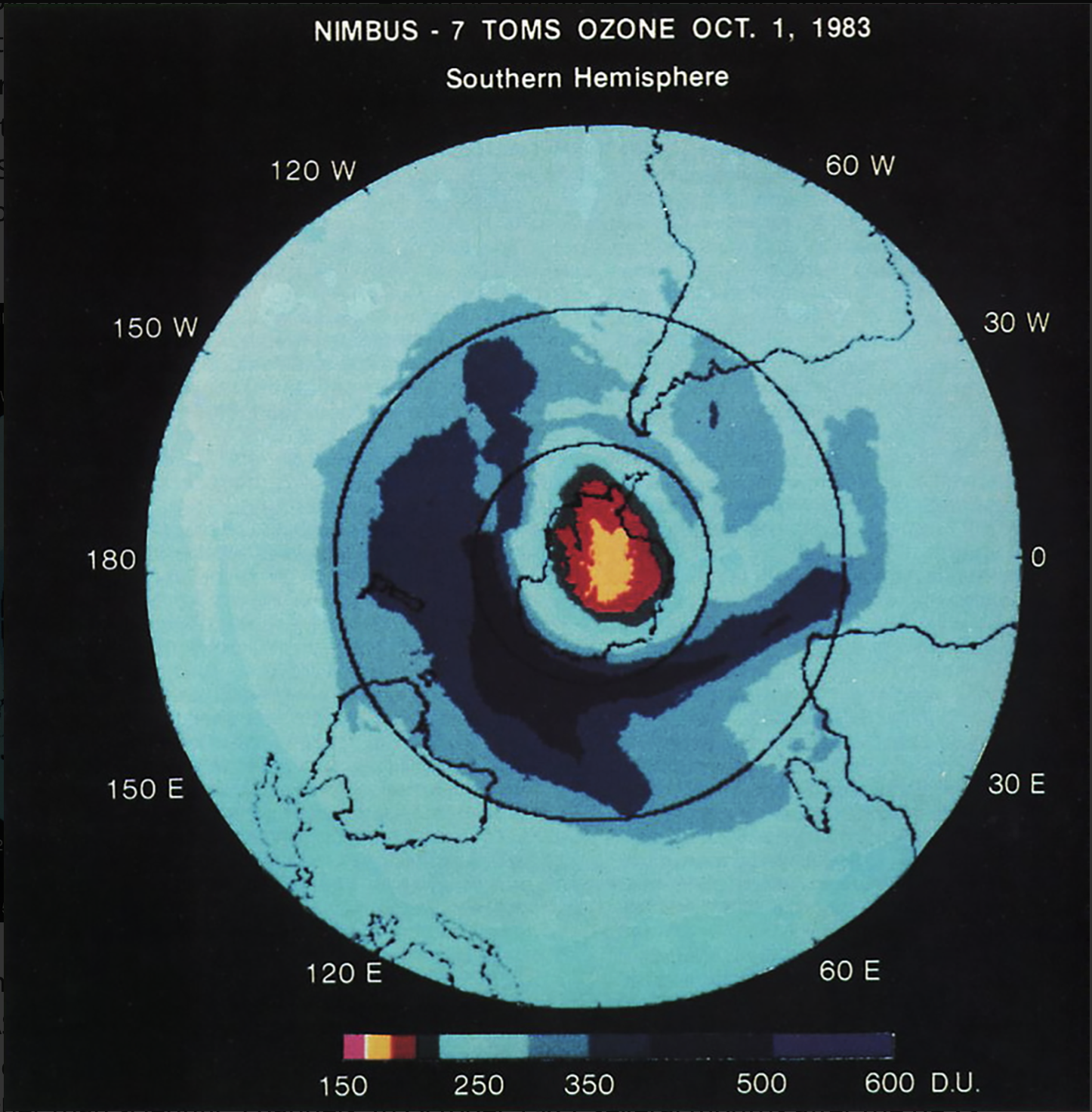
Parts of southern Australia have been exposed to high levels of ultraviolet radiation due to south polar ozone depletion since the 1970s.

Due to its position in the Southern Hemisphere close to Antarctica, Australia is one of the parts of the world most affected by ozone depletion, which results in dangerous increases to solar radiation, particularly ultraviolet radiation. Increased UV levels compromise the genetic integrity and immune systems of living organisms, impairs photosynthesis, contributes to climate change, and to one of the highest mortality rates of skin cancer in the world. It is generally believed that the Montreal Protocol (1987) has helped alleviate anthropogenic ozone depletion by banning destructive chlorofluorocarbon emissions, and this has helped protect Australia from exposure to catastrophic levels of UV radiation. Though the "hole" in the ozone which the Protocol sought to prevent has not reached Australia, it has experienced significant sustained thinning at its latitudes, causing elevated levels of solar irradiation. Increased incidence of large scale bushfires in Australia has contributed to recent ozone depletion, contributing to a sort of solar irradiation feedback loop.

== Conservation ==
Conservation in Australia is an issue of state and federal policy. Australia is one of the most biologically diverse countries in the world, with a large portion of species endemic to Australia. Preserving this wealth of biodiversity is important for future generations.

In Australia forest cover is around 17% of the total land area, equivalent to 134,005,100 hectares (ha) of forest in 2020, up from 133,882,200 hectares (ha) in 1990. In 2020, naturally regenerating forest covered 131,614,800 hectares (ha) and planted forest covered 2,390,300 hectares (ha). Of the naturally regenerating forest 0% was reported to be primary forest (consisting of native tree species with no clearly visible indications of human activity) and around 18% of the forest area was found within protected areas. For the year 2015, 67% of the forest area was reported to be under public ownership, 32% private ownership and 1% with ownership listed as other or unknown.

A key conservation issue is the preservation of biodiversity, especially by protecting the remaining rainforests. The destruction of habitat by human activities, including land clearing, remains the major cause of biodiversity loss in Australia. The importance of the Australian rainforests to the conservation movement is very high. Australia is the only western country to have large areas of rainforest intact. Forests provide timber, drugs, and food and should be managed to maximise the possible uses. Currently, there are a number of environmental movements and campaigners advocating for action on saving the environment, one such campaign is the Big Switch.

Land management issues including clearance of native vegetation, reafforestation of once-cleared areas, control of exotic weeds and pests, expansion of dryland salinity, acid sulphate soils, and changed fire regimes. Intensification of resource use in sectors such as forestry, fisheries, and agriculture are widely reported to contribute to biodiversity loss in Australia. Coastal and marine environments also have reduced biodiversity from reduced water quality caused by pollution and sediments arising from human settlements and agriculture. In central New South Wales where there are large plains of grassland, problems have risen from—unusual to say—lack of land clearing.

The Daintree Rainforest, a tropical rainforest near Daintree, Queensland covering around 1200 square kilometres, is threatened by logging, development, mining and the effects of the high tourist numbers.

There are some government programs in Australia which are the opposite of conservation (such as killing wildlife); an example of this is shark culling, which currently occurs in New South Wales and Queensland.

=== Native fauna ===
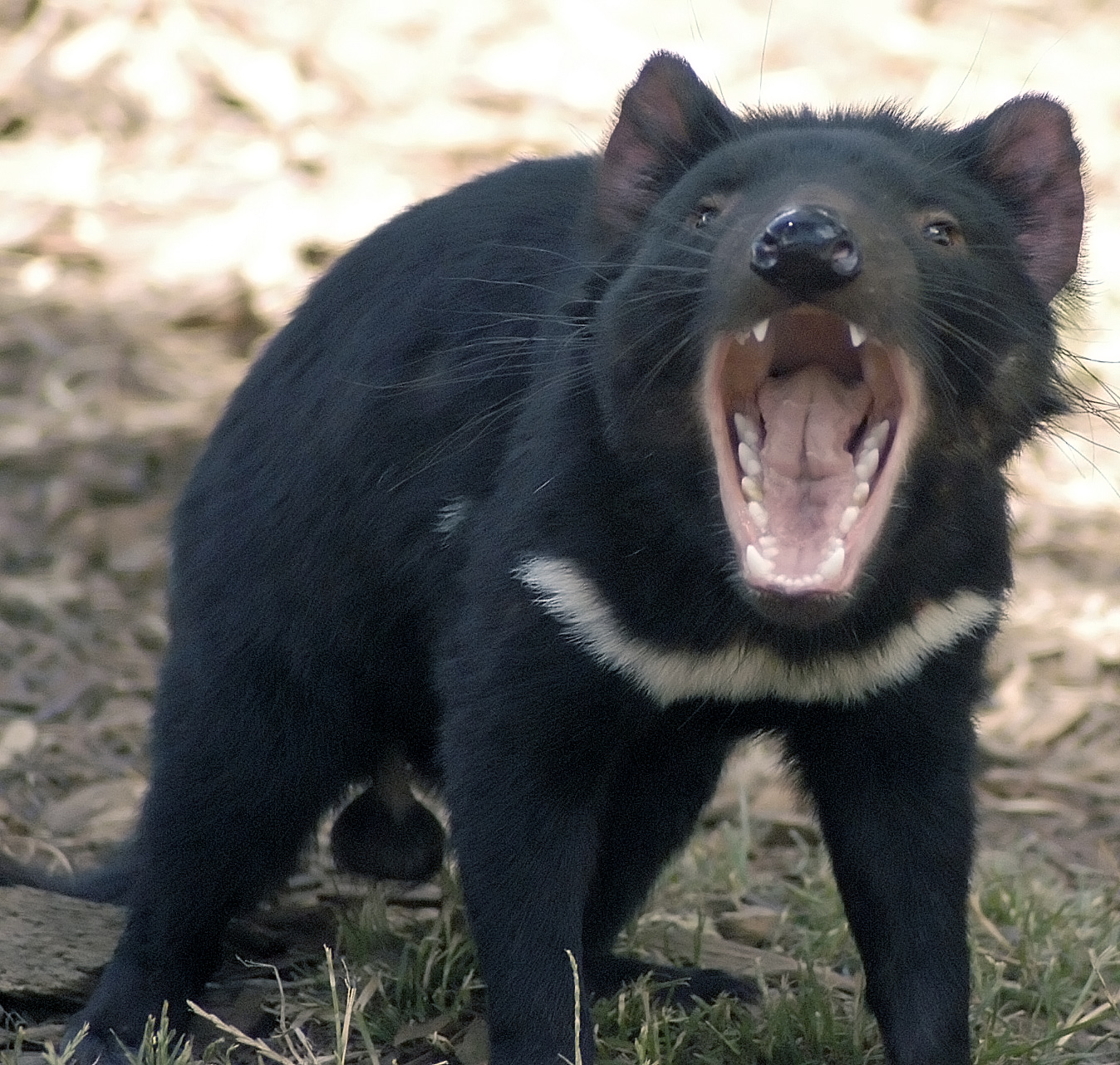
The Tasmanian devil, officially listed as an endangered species in 2008

Over a hundred species of fauna are currently under serious threat of extinction. The plight of some of these species receives more attention than others and recently the focus of many conservation organisations has been the critically endangered northern hairy-nosed wombat, the endangered Tasmanian devil, northern tiger quoll, south eastern red-tailed black cockatoo, southern cassowary, Tasmanian wedge-tailed eagle, Leadbeater's possum and southern corroboree frog.

Australia has a poor record of conservation of native fauna. The extinction of Australian megafauna is partially attributed to the arrival of humans and since European settlement, 23 birds, 4 frogs, and 27 mammal species are also known to have become extinct.

=== Marine conservation ===
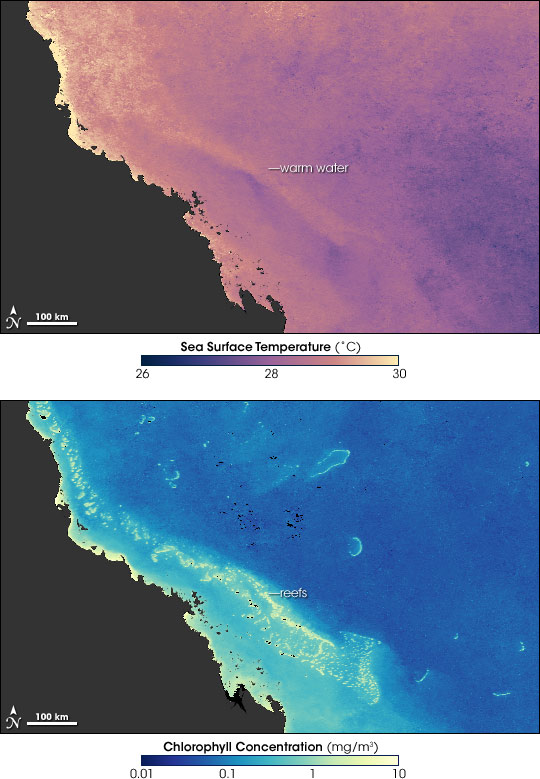
Recent climate change reports have highlighted the threat of higher water temperatures to the Great Barrier Reef.

One of the notable issues with marine conservation in Australia is the protection of the Great Barrier Reef. The Great Barrier Reef's environmental pressures include water quality from runoff, climate change and mass coral bleaching, cyclic outbreaks of the crown-of-thorns starfish, overfishing, and shipping accidents. The government of Queensland currently kills sharks in the Great Barrier Reef using drum lines, causing damage to the marine ecosystem.

In 2021 Australia announced the creation of 2 national marine parks in size of 740,000 square kilometres. With those parks 45% of the Australian marine territory will be protected.

==== Whaling ====
Whaling in Australia took place from colonisation in 1788. In 1979 Australia terminated whaling and committed to whale protection. The main varieties hunted were humpback, blue, right and sperm whales.

==== Shark culling ====
Western Australia culled sharks in 2014, killing dozens of tiger sharks and causing public protest. Later that year it was abandoned, and the government of Western Australia continued to shoot and kill sharks it believed to be an "imminent threat" to humans from 2014 to 2017; this policy was criticised by senator Rachel Siewart for being environmentally damaging.

From 1962 to the present, the government of Queensland has killed sharks on drum lines and shark nets, a process that also kills other animals such as dolphins and dugongs. From 1962 to 2018, Queensland's "shark control" program killed roughly 50,000 sharks, including sharks in the Great Barrier Reef. Queensland's shark-killing program has been called "outdated, cruel and ineffective".

New South Wales has a shark net program that kills sharks as well as other marine life. Between 1950 and 2008, 352 tiger sharks and 577 great white sharks were killed in the nets in New South Wales – also during this period, a total of 15,135 marine animals were killed in the nets, including whales and turtles. There has been a very large decrease in the number of sharks in eastern Australia in recent years, and the shark-killing programs in Queensland and New South Wales are partly responsible for this decrease.

Jessica Morris of Humane Society International calls shark culling a "knee-jerk reaction" and says, "sharks are top order predators that play an important role in the functioning of marine ecosystems. We need them for healthy oceans."

==== Oil spills ====
While there have been no oil spill environmental disasters of the scale of the Exxon Valdez in the country, Australia has a large oil industry and there have been several large oil spills . Spills remain a serious threat to the marine environment and Australian coastline. The largest spill to date was the Kirki tanker in 1991 which dropped 17,280 tonnes of oil off the coast of Western Australia.

In March 2009, the 2009 southeast Queensland oil spill occurred, where 200,000 litres were spilled from the MV Pacific Adventurer spilling more than 250 tonnes of oil, 30 tonnes of fuel and other toxic chemicals on Brisbane's suburban beaches. Premier Anna Bligh described the spill as "worst environmental disaster Queensland has ever seen".

==== Ocean dumping ====
A serious issue to the Australian marine environment is the dumping of rubbish from ships. There have been a number of cases, particularly involving the navy of Australian and other countries polluting Australian waters including the dumping of chemical warfare agents. Recently documented cases include the aircraft carrier USS Ronald Reagan in 2006 which was found to be dumping rubbish off the shores of Moreton Island. In Victoria, a large number of toxic drums containing 1,2-Dichlorobenzene xylenol, a substance very toxic to aquatic creatures washed up on beaches during May 2009 presumably fallen off a passing container ship.

== Invasive species ==
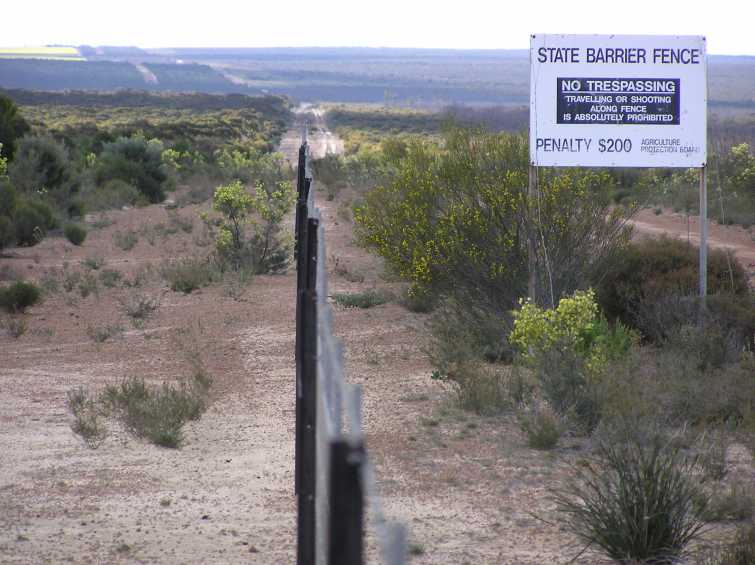
A rabbit-proof fence enforces a barrier to protect agriculture areas in Western Australia. Rabbits are an invasive species in Australia.

Australia's geographical isolation has resulted in the evolution of many delicate ecological relationships that are sensitive to foreign invaders and in many instances provided no natural predators for many of the species subsequently introduced. The introduction and prolific breeding of animal species such as the cane toad (Rhinella marina) and rabbit (Oryctolagus cuniculus) had greatly disrupted native species populations. Introduced species in Australia are problematic in that they may outcompete or, in the case of the can toad, red fox (Vulpes vulpes) and feral domestic cats (Felis catus), directly kill native species. Rabbits in Australia along with feral beasts of burden disrupt native species by destroying vulnerable habitat requiring drastic pest-exclusion measures such as the Rabbit-proof fence. The cane toad invasion is particularly concerning due to them having few predators and apart from extensively outcompeting native species their toxicity kills thousands of native apex predators each year. The threat of the ongoing cane toad invasion has seen the establishment of a national taskforce despite its potential range being limited to the north of the continent. Likewise Tasmania takes the threat of the species so seriously that it has a government sponsored taskforce to prevent fox populations from taking hold on the island. The species has single-handedly caused the extinction of several native species on the mainland.

Australia is also vulnerable to invasive weeds. Controlling the invasion of prickly pears in Australia is one of the success stories of invasive species control. The government maintains a Weeds of National Significance (WONS) list of problematic plant species.

== Land degradation ==
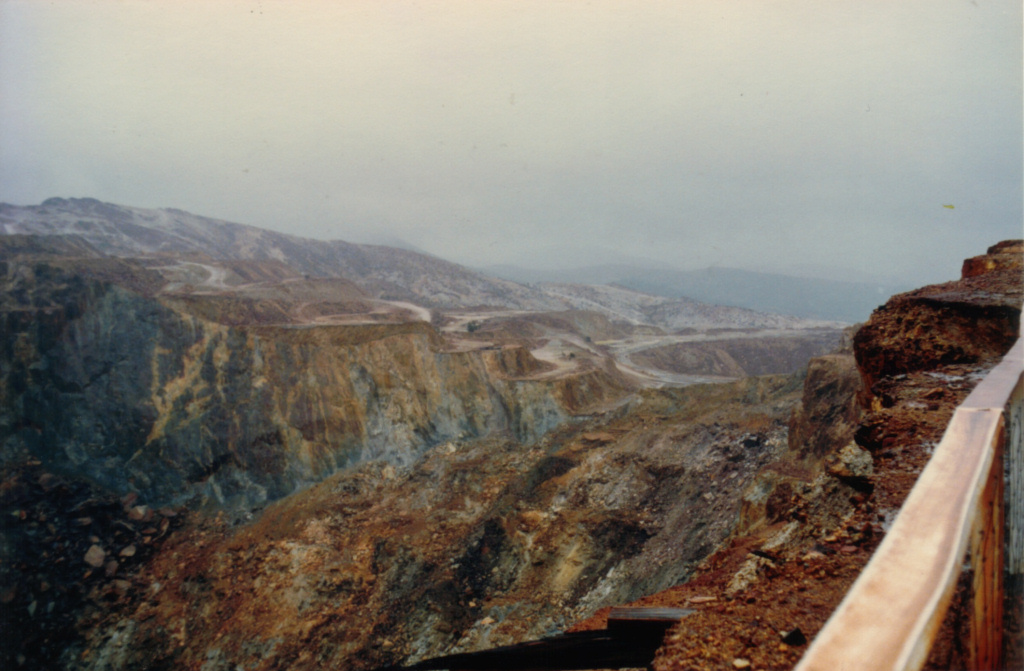
Mountains near Queenstown, Tasmania, completely denuded of vegetation through effects of mining

According to Jared Diamond, "Australia's number-one environmental problem [is] land degradation". Land degradation results from nine types of damaging environmental impacts:

- Clearance of native vegetation
- Overgrazing by sheep
- Rabbits
- Soil nutrient exhaustion
- Soil erosion
- Man-made droughts
- Weeds
- Misguided governmental policies
- Salinisation

=== Logging and woodchipping ===
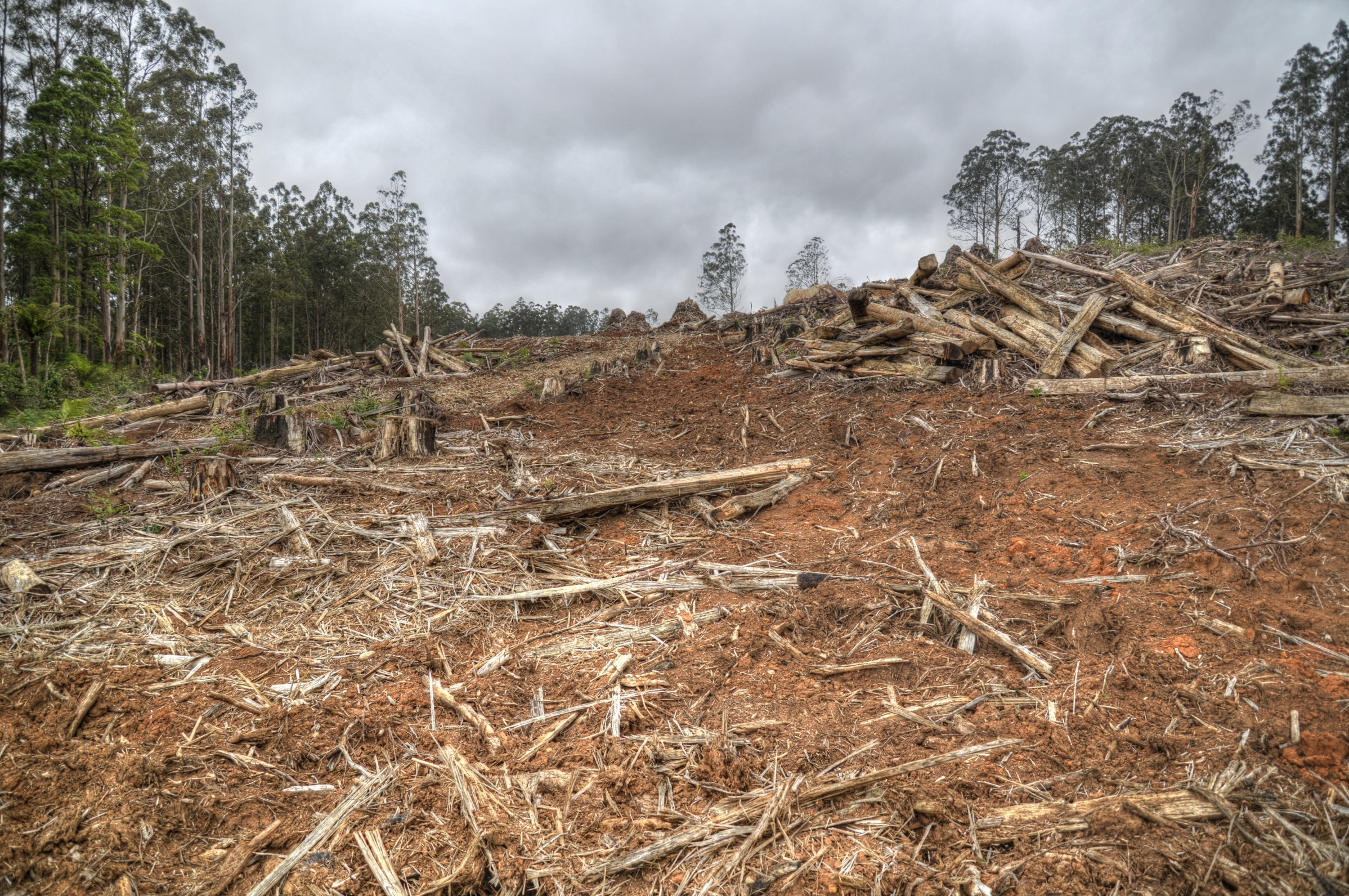
Logging in the Toolangi State Forest near Melbourne, Victoria

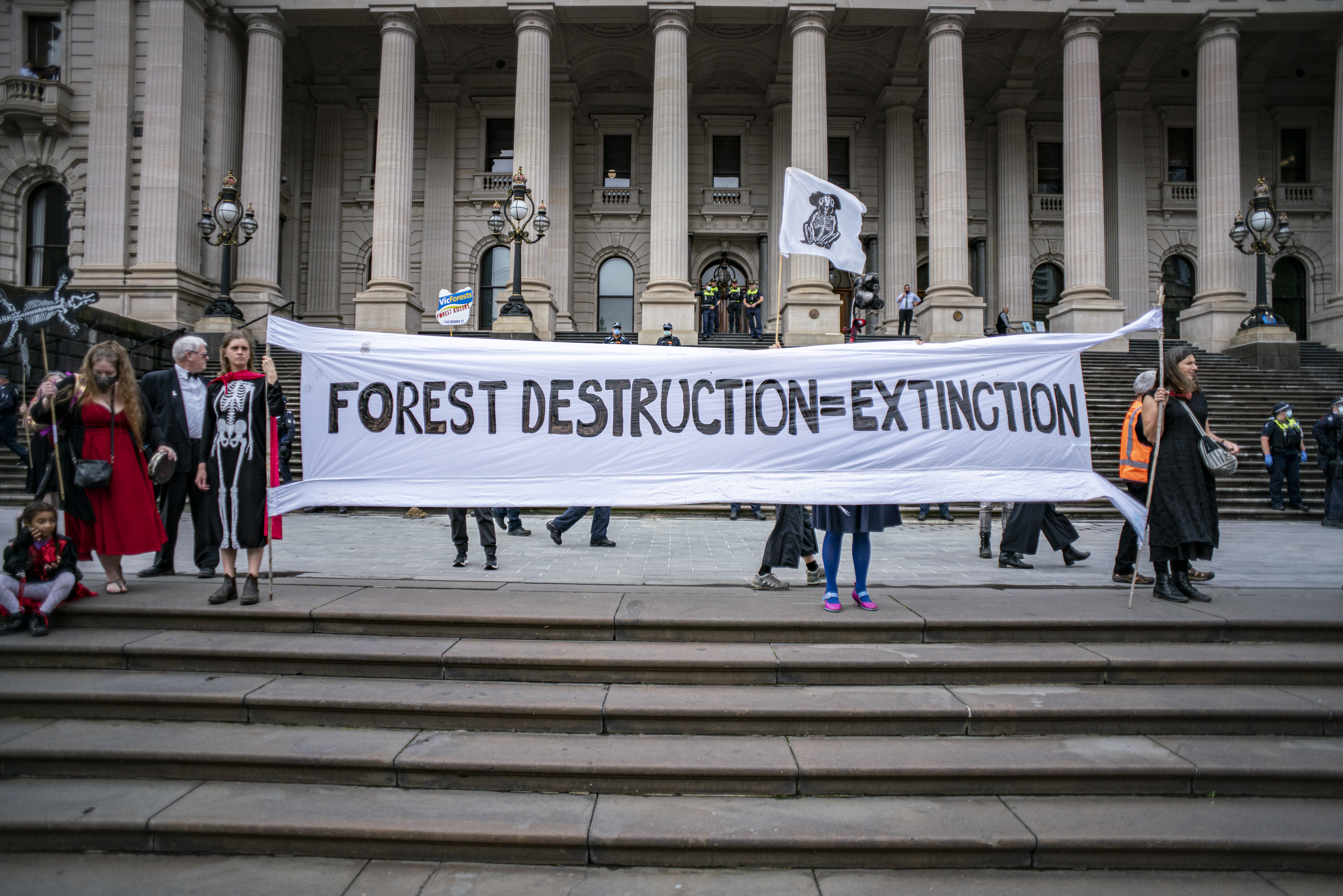
Protest in Melbourne against logging of Victoria's old growth forests

Clearcutting of old-growth forests is continuing in parts of Australia primarily in the eastern states of Tasmania, Victoria and New South Wales. This often involves the destruction of natural ecosystems and the replacement with monoculture plantations.

Australia had a 2018 Forest Landscape Integrity Index mean score of 7.22/10, ranking it 46th globally out of 172 countries.

=== Land clearing and soil salinity ===
In the prehistory of Australia the Indigenous Australians used fire-stick farming which was an early form of land clearing which caused long term changes to the ecology. With European colonisation land clearing continued on a larger scale for agriculture – particularly for cattle, cotton and wheat production. Since European settlement a total of 13% of native vegetation cover has been lost. The extinction of 20 different mammals, 9 bird and 97 plant species have been partially attributed to land clearing. Land clearing is a major source of Australia's greenhouse gas emissions, and contributed to approximately 12 percent of Australia's total emissions in 1998.

The consequences of land clearing include dryland salinity and soil erosion. These are a major concern to the landcare movement in Australia. Soil salinity affects 50,000 km^{2} of Australia and is predominantly due to land clearance.

The clearing of native vegetation is controlled by Federal laws (indirectly), State law and local planning instruments. The precise details of regulation of vegetation clearing differ according to the location where clearing is proposed.

== Waterway health ==
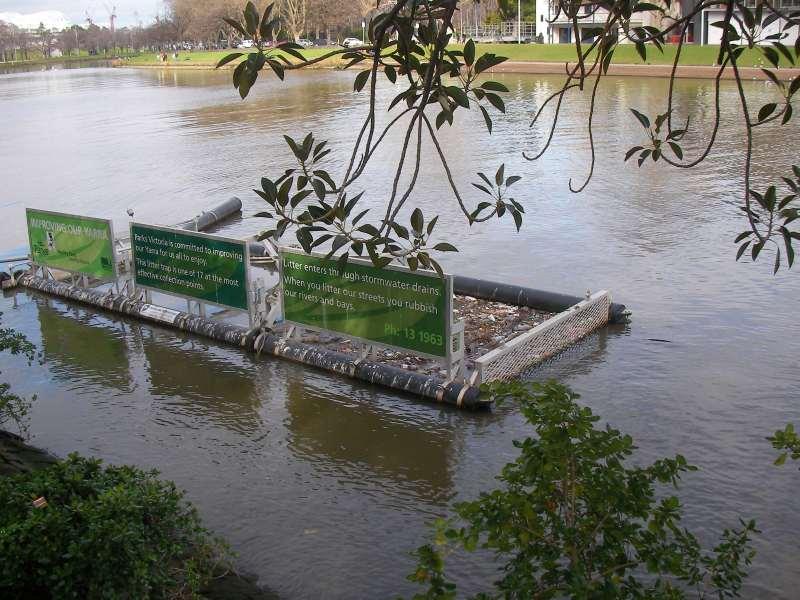
A Parks Victoria litter trap on the river catches floating rubbish on the Yarra at Birrarung Marr

The protection of waterways in Australia is a major concern for various reasons including habitat and biodiversity, but also due to use of the waterways by humans.

The Murray–Darling basin is under threat due to irrigation in Australia, causing high levels of salinity which affect agriculture and biodiversity in New South Wales, Victoria and South Australia. These rivers are also affected by pesticide run-off and drought. Low oxygen levels in the water combined with high temperatures has led to fish kills in the Darling River in 2018, 2019 and 2023. The worst was in March 2023 in which millions of dead bony bream, golden perch silver perch and some Murray cod flowed down the river.

=== Australian waterways facing environmental issues ===
Rivers and creeks in urban areas also face environmental issues, particularly pollution.

==== Victoria ====
- Port Phillip (contamination – silt; sediment; toxins; household chemicals; garden chemicals; E. coli; litter; flotsam and jetsam)
- Yarra River (contamination – E. coli; litter – 13 traps; logging; erosion; salinity)
- Maribyrnong River (contamination – arsenic and heavy metals; litter – 1 trap)
- Mullum Mullum Creek (contamination – E. coli; litter)
- Moonee Ponds Creek (contamination – predominantly plastic and polystrene; multiple traps)
- Murray River (salinity, erosion)

==== New South Wales ====
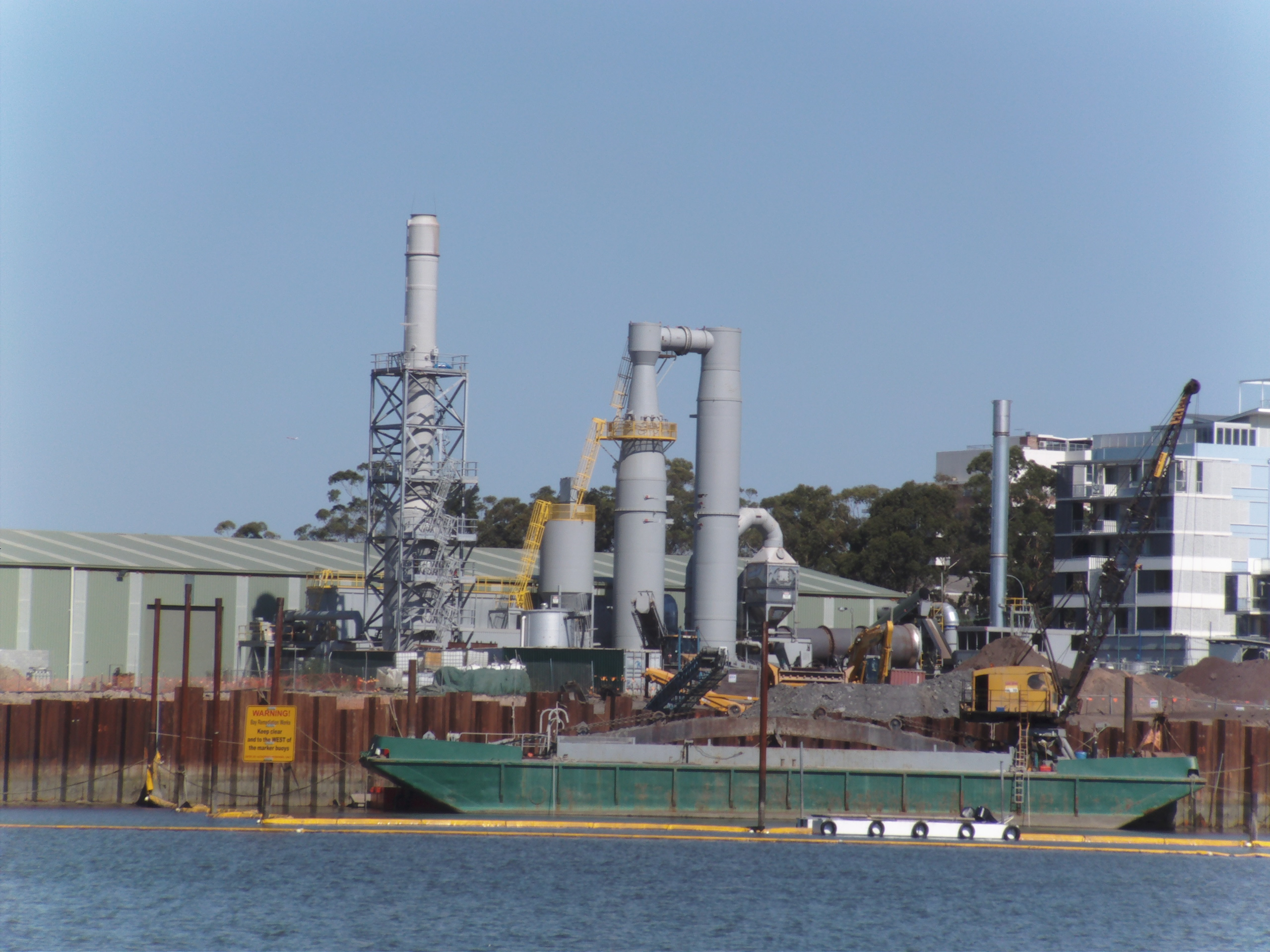
Remediation of soil and sediment from Homebush Bay on the Parramatta River by desorbtion and incineration

- Parramatta River (contamination – dioxins, arsenic, coal tars, chromium, lead and phthalates)
- Darling River (salinity, erosion)
- Murray River (salinity, erosion)
- Cooks River (pollution, algal blooms)

==== Queensland ====
- Bremer River (water grading F – lowest possible)
- Brisbane River
- Oxley Creek (water grading D)
- Bulimba Creek (threatened species due to land degradation; pollution; litter)

==== South Australia ====
- River Torrens (contaminants – E. coli; algal bloom)

== Urbanisation ==
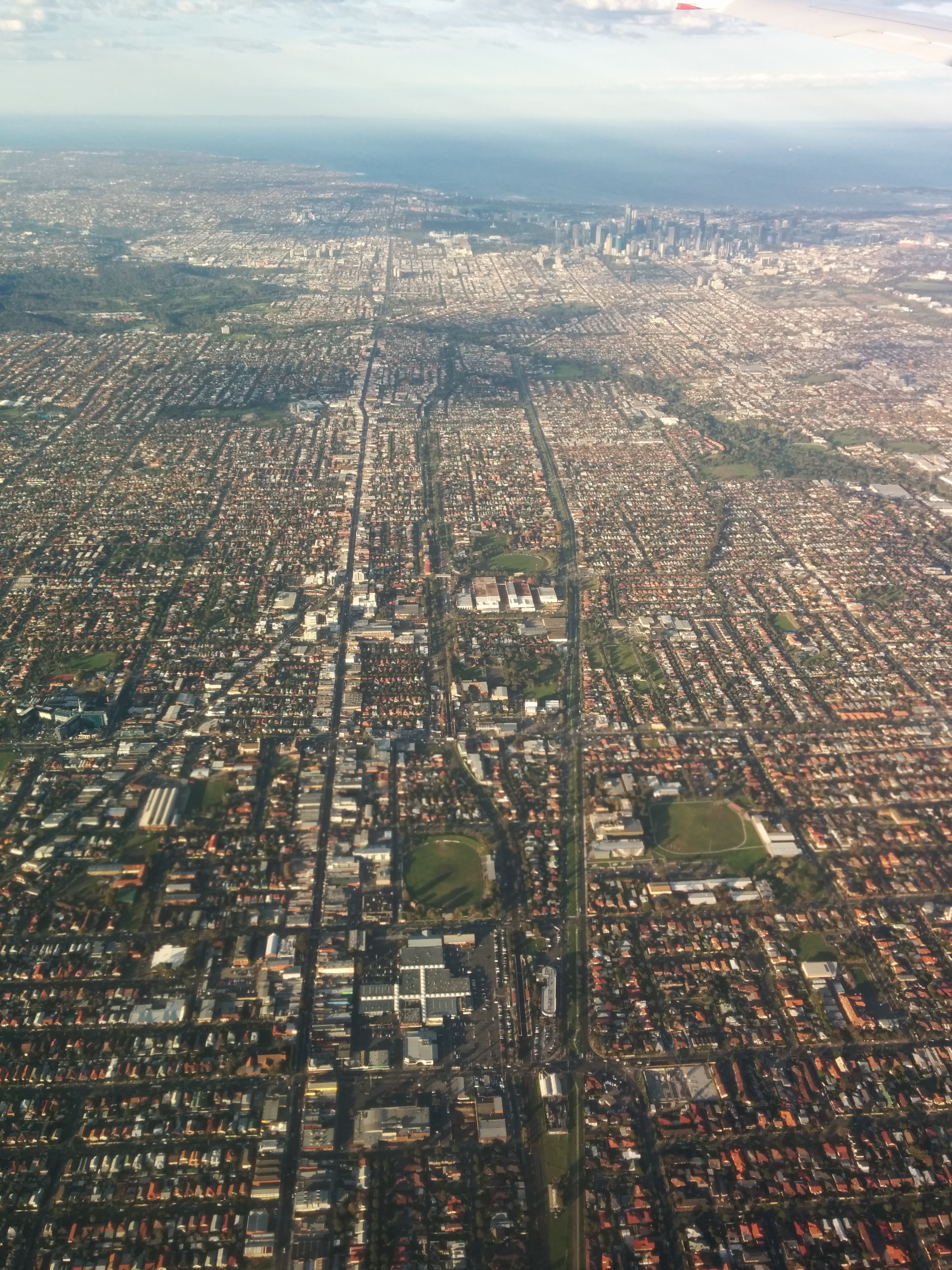
The urban sprawl of Melbourne, spreading from the city centre (towards top right of the image)

Australia is one of the most urbanised countries in the world. Many Australian cities have large urban footprints and are characterised by an unsustainable low density urban sprawl. This places demand on infrastructure and services which contributes to the problems of land clearing, pollution, transport related emissions, energy consumption, invasive species, automobile dependency and urban heat islands.

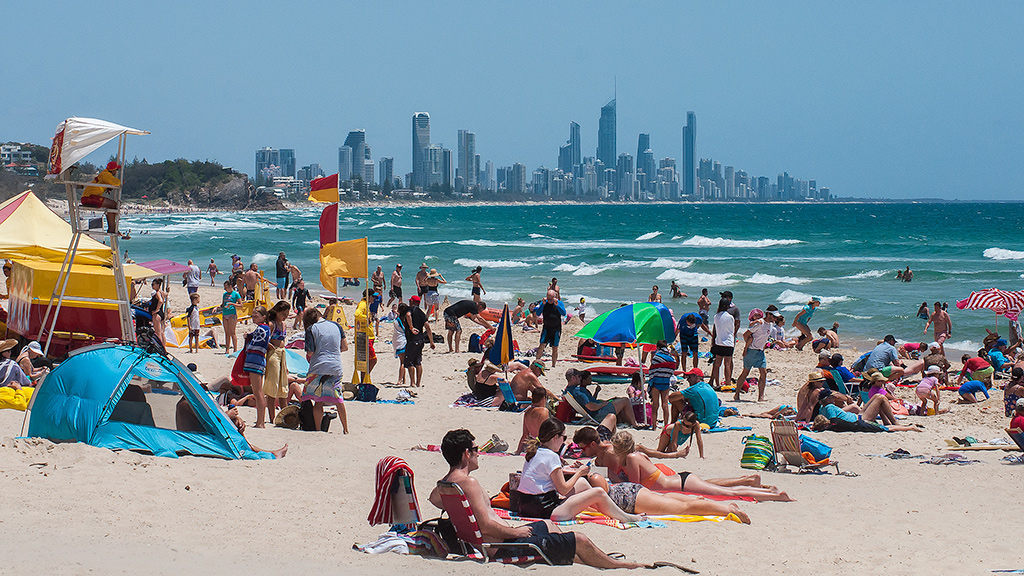
A Queensland beach with the skyline of the heavily developed Gold Coast in the background. Formerly swamplands, the city was urbanised on a coastal strip between waterways and the sea and now contains many high rises.

The urban sprawl continues to increase at a rapid rate in most Australian cities, particularly the state capital cities, all of which (with the exception of Hobart) are metropoleis. In some centres, such as Sydney and Greater Western Sydney, Greater Melbourne and South East Queensland large metropolitan conurbations threaten to extend for hundreds of kilometres and based on current population growth rates are expected to become megacities in the 21st century. Most Australian cities population growth is a result of migration in contrast to the birth rate and fertility rate in Australia, which is contributing to the ongoing trend of urbanisation.

In recent years, some cities have implemented transit-oriented development strategies to curb the urban sprawl. Notable examples include Melbourne 2030, South East Queensland Regional Plan and the Sydney Metropolitan Strategy. There are also population decentralisation programs at state and federal levels aimed at shifting populations out of the major centres and stemming the drivers to rapid urbanisation. Albury-Wodonga was part of the federal government's program of decentralisation begun in the 1970s, which has at times had relocation policies for immigration. The Victorian government has run a decentralisation program since the 1960s, having had a ministerial position appointed and ongoing promotional and investment programs for stimulating growth in Regional Victoria. However policy has swung over the decades, primarily due to local development priorities and agendas and a lack of federal co-ordination to the problem.

Issues include large quantities of e-waste and toxic waste going into landfill. Australia does not have restrictions on the dumping of toxic materials that are common in other countries, such as dumping cathode-ray tubes which leach heavy metals into water catchments. Due to the lack of sufficient sites for toxic waste disposal large quantities of toxic waste are trucked between states to remote dumping grounds or exported overseas in ships.

== Mining issues ==
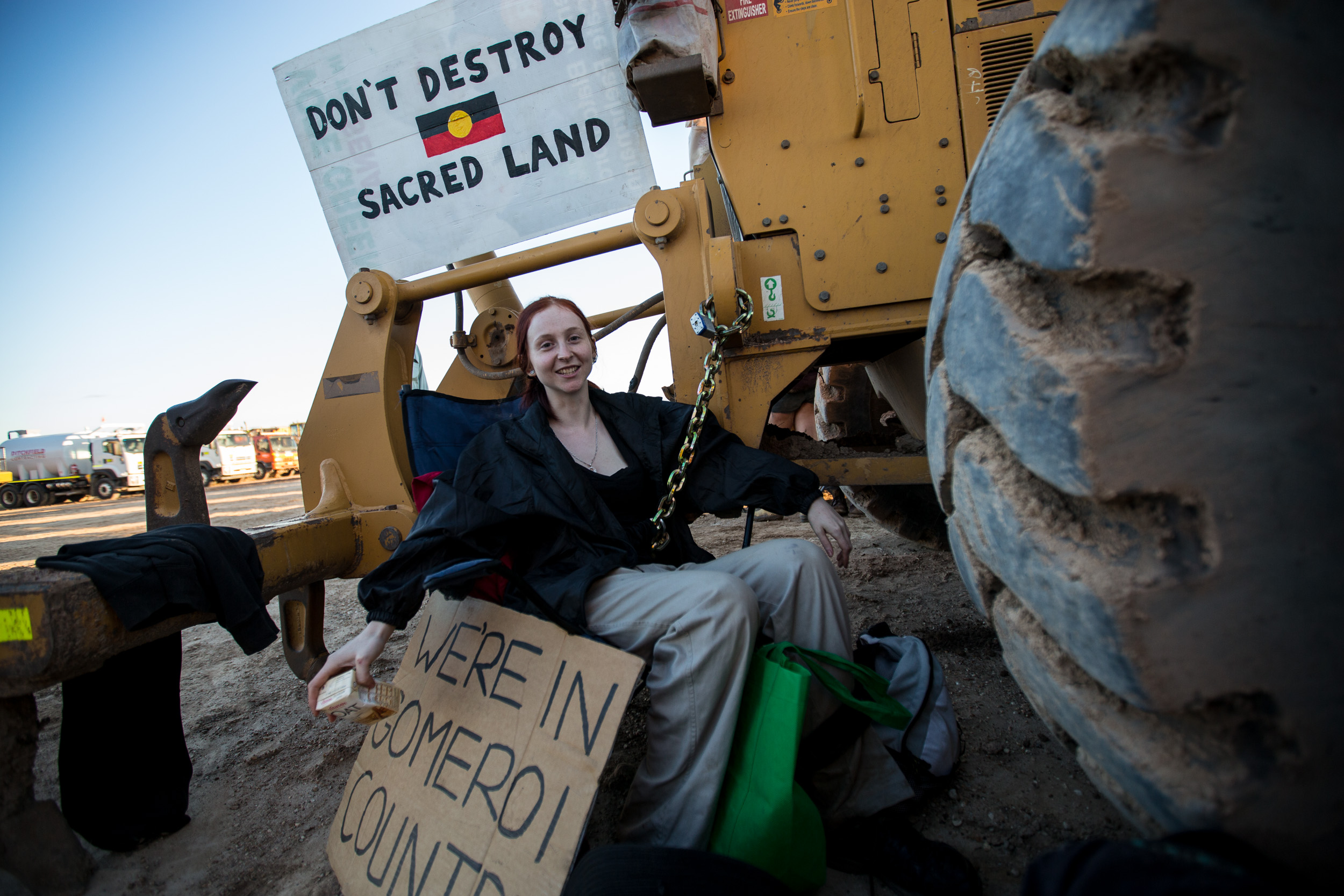
A protestor locks on to heavy earthmoving equipment during an action against Maules Creek coal mine.

Australia has some of the largest mining operations in the southern hemisphere and is a major exporter of several resources that have significant environmental effects, most notably coal and uranium.

Australia has the largest reserves of uranium in the world and there has been a number of enquiries on uranium mining. The anti-nuclear movement in Australia actively opposes mining and seeks to prevent the construction of nuclear power plants.

At least 150 leaks, spills and licence breaches occurred at the Ranger uranium mine between 1981 and 2009.

== Controversial land use projects ==
The following is a list of development projects that have been controversial due to concerns of environmental effects. This list includes projects required to submit an Environmental Effects Statement.

Project/Area affected	Activity	State	Began	Notes
Wittenoom	Crocidolite (asbestos) mining	Western Australia	1938	Now a prohibited area (exclusion zone) known as the Wittenoom Prohibited Area. Widespread contamination causing thousands of cancers (including mesothelioma) and many hundreds of deaths. In addition to widespread contamination about half the material mined by Australian Blue Asbestos was distributed throughout Australia resulting in an ongoing public health crisis. Australia banned use of asbestos in 2003.
Northampton	Lead mining	Western Australia	1954	Lead tailing contamination, leaching into waterways, encapsulation and extensive cleanup
British nuclear tests at Maralinga	Nuclear testing	South Australia	1955	Massive radioactive contamination. Continual cleanup operations. Long-term health effects on local Indigenous tribes and former personnel. Now part of a prohibited area (exclusion zone) known as the Woomera Prohibited Area.
Kings Park	Clearing	Western Australia	1956	Clearing of urban bushland to build a swimming pool and car park. A campaign by a coalition of scientific, naturalist and heritage groups prevented it from going ahead.
Mounts Bay	Infilling	Western Australia	1963	Infilling of the Swan River to create land for freeway construction. This was opposed by the Citizens' Committee for the Protection of Kings Park and the Swan River.
Kelly's Bush	Clearing	New South Wales	1970	Clearing of urban bushland for suburban development. The area was protected after the NSW Builders' Labourers' Federation (BLF) placed a 'green ban' on the site.
Blackbutt Nature Reserve	Clearing	New South Wales	1973	Clearing of Newcastle bushland for the construction of an expressway. Work was halted by a BLF green ban and the area subsequently protected.
Riley's Island	Clearing	New South Wales	1973	Clearing of native habitat for suburban development. A BLF green ban halted work and the area was made a nature reserve in 1989.
Port Kembla Beach	Clearing, dredging	New South Wales	1974	Dredging for sandmining and clearing for property development. Halted by South Coast Labour Council and BLF work bans.
Terania Creek	Logging	New South Wales	1979	Logging of old growth rainforest. After four weeks of blockading, a moratorium was placed on work and a government inquiry subsequently held, after which the area was added to the newly created Nightcap National Park.
Middle Head Beach	Sand mining	New South Wales	1980	Destruction of beach and sacred sites by industrial dredging. Following months of blockading the neighbouring beach at Grassy Head beach was spared and the NSW government granted no more beach sand mining leases after 1980.
Ranger uranium mine	Uranium mining	Northern Territory	1980	Possible contamination of land with radioactive mine tailings. Ranger mine contained within Kakadu National Park.
Nightcap rainforest	Logging	New South Wales	1982	Logging of old growth rainforest at Grier's Scrub and Mount Nardi. Following blockading, work was halted at the latter and the area later made part of the Nightcap National Park.
Broken Hill	Uranium mining	New South Wales	1982	Potential radioactive toxicity and damage to habitat due to mine leaks. The proposed Honeymoon Uranium Mine was delayed for almost 20 years by campaigns involving unions, traditional owners and environmentalists. It opened in 2011 but then closed in 2013 due to a decline in demand for uranium.
Franklin Dam	Damming	Tasmania	1983	Damming of forested area, watercourse damage, reduced water flow. Catalyst for the foundation of the Australian Greens. The project was cancelled by the Hawke federal ALP government in 1983, following a three-month blockade of clearing and over 1000 arrests.
Daintree rainforest	Road building	Queensland	1983	Clearing of rainforest in a national park to build a track. Threat of increased development. Track was pushed through in 1984 but quickly deteriorated and was not refurbished after the area was granted World Heritage status.
Roxby Downs	Uranium mining	South Australia	1983	Possible contamination of land with radioactive mine tailings. Mine construction was disrupted by blockades in 1983 and 1984 before opening in 1988.
Farmhouse Creek	Road building, logging	Tasmania	1986	Clearing to build a road to facilitate the logging of old growth forest. Opposed by a blockade using Australia's first tree sit platform. Following further blockading, parts of the area were eventually granted protection after a federal government inquiry.
Mount Etna	Mining	Queensland	1987	Destruction of little bent-wing bat breeding habitat through the blasting of caves to enable limestone mining. A blockade led to mining being halted for six months but in 1988 the caves were destroyed.
Washpool	Roadbuilding, Logging	New South Wales	1989	Road construction to enable the logging of old growth forest. Blockading held up the project before a court injunction stopped work due to the presence of Aboriginal sacred sites. The area gained protection the following year after another injunction was gained due to illegal logging and faults with an Environmental Impact Statement. It was added to the Washpool National Park in 1999.
Mount Royal	Logging	New South Wales	1989	Logging of old growth habitat in a state forest. Following protest action work was stopped by a court injunction. The area was added to the Mount Royal National Park in 1997.
Chaelundi	Logging	New South Wales	1990	Logging of old growth forest. Work was blockaded and then halted after the NSW Forestry Commission was ordered to undertake an Environment Impact Statement. When logging was resumed in 1991 it was disrupted by blockaders until a further court injunction stopped work. A further attempt to log was prevented by direct action in 1994 and the area subsequently made a national park.
Fraser Island (K'gari)	Logging	Queensland	1990	Logging of old growth forest. Blockading disrupted work and in 1991 a government inquiry report led to logging being phased out. The island was later accorded World Heritage status.
Brown Mountain	Logging	Victoria	1990	Logging of old growth forest, which was disrupted by blockaders and then suspended for three years. Logging was later resumed leading to another blockade in 2009.
Mount Killiekrankie	Logging	New South Wales	1990	Logging of old growth forest. Work was blockaded until it was stopped due to the NSW Forestry Commission being prosecuted for polluting the Bellinger River. The area was added to the New England National Park in 1999.
Mummel Gulf	Logging	New South Wales	1992	Logging of old growth forest. A three month long blockade prevented cutting. The Mummel Gulf National Park and Mummel Gulf State Conservation Area were created in 1999.
Wild Cattle Creek	Logging	New South Wales	1992	Logging of old growth forest. Despite two blockades most of the area was logged by 1994. The area was later added to the Cascade National Park.
Exit Caves	Mining	Tasmania	1992	Mining for limestone within a World Heritage area and its effects on a 21 kilometre long cave system. Following protests blasting was halted by the federal government but mining continued until the Bender Limestone quarry was closed in 1994.
Dingo and Bulgar Forests	Logging	New South Wales	1993	Logging of old growth forest. Blockading disrupted work. Sections were later added to the Tapin Tops National Park.
Cairns and Kuranda	Clearing	Queensland	1993	Clearing of World Heritage listed rainforest as part of construction of the 7.5 kilometre Skyrail Rainforest Cableway.
Yarra Valley	Logging	Victoria	1993	Deforestation, threatening of a major water catchment, threatening the endangered Leadbeater's possum.
Hinchinbrook Island	Clearing and dredging	Queensland	1994	Bulldozing and dredging of mangroves for a tourist development. Blockading disrupted work but the marina was completed.
Kerr Forest	Logging	Western Australia	1994	Logging of old growth forest. Work was disrupted by 30 Balingup residents before litigation resulted in an injunction being placed on logging.
Whian Whian State Forest	Logging	New South Wales	1994	Old growth forest logging. Blockading stalled work until 1997 when the contractor agreed to withdraw from the area. It was made part of the Nightcap National Park the following year.
M2 Motorway	Clearing	New South Wales	1995	Clearing of urban bushland in Sydney including Aboriginal sacred sites and 100 000 trees. Construction was opposed by protesters using lockons, treesits and site occupations.
Nullum State Forest	Logging	New South Wales	1995	Old growth forest logging. Following a blockade by local residents and the Byron Bay Environment Centre the Forestry Corporation of New South Wales was fined $25,000 for breaches of the Pollution Control Act. The area was later added to Mount Jerusalem National Park.
Jane Block	Logging	Western Australia	1995	Old growth forest logging. Work was disrupted by a blockade before litigation protected the remaining stands of forest from logging.
Iron Gates, Evans Head	Development	New South Wales	1997	Destruction of beach and Aboriginal sacred sites for suburban development. Following blockading and litigation clearing was put on hold. The developer, who later went bankrupt, was ordered to rehabilitate the site.
Barmah-Millewa	Logging, stock grazing	Victoria	1998	Destruction of red river gum habitat by logging and poor farming practices. The issue had been a major one for traditional owners and environmentalists for some years but the two came together in the late 1990s and increased their campaigning efforts. In 2008 the Victorian government placed 91,000 hectares under protection and agreed to co-management with traditional owners.
Jabiluka	Clearing, uranium mining	Northern Territory	1998	Clearing and toxicity risks associated with the construction of a uranium mine. Traditional owners called for nonviolent direct action against construction and this eventually involved 5000 people. They also refused to grant use of their land. Following campaigning and court cases Rio Tinto cancelled the project in 2001 and later engaged in rehabilitation works.
Tiwi Islands	Deforestation and woodchipping	Northern Territory	2001	Deforestation approved by the Howard government. Operators significantly breached environmental laws resulting in excessive irreparable land clearing.
Nowingi toxic waste proposal	Toxic waste	Victoria	2004	Toxic waste disposal plant. Threat to surrounding settlements, Murray River and environment.
Bell Bay Pulp Mill	Logging	Tasmania	2006	Deforestation. Threatening of old growth forests in the Tamar Valley. Claims effluent could harm Bass Strait marine life.
Styx Valley	Logging and woodchipping	Tasmania	2006	Deforestation. Destruction of old growth forests.
Wonthaggi desalination plant	Desalination	Victoria	2007	Uneconomic. Pollution of the Bass Coast. Accusations of government/private entity corruption. Lack of consultation with community. No justification for perceived requirement. Insufficient initial assessment. Insufficient EES.
Port Phillip Channel Deepening Project	Dredging	Victoria	2008	Dredging in heavy metal-laiden shipping ports posed contamination concerns. Destruction of marine environments. Catalyst for the foundation of the Blue Wedges community group.
Walmadan/James Price Point	Clearing	Western Australia	2011	Habitat destruction through the construction of a 30 km gas refinery site. A protest camp bringing together First Nations community members, environmentalists and others disrupted preliminary work before Woodside abandoned the project. The WA Supreme Court subsequently found that the environmental approvals originally enabling it to go ahead were illegal.
Leard State forest	Clearing	New South Wales	2012	Clearing of forest habitat for construction of the Maules Creek coal mine. Work was disrupted by nonviolent direct action.
Beeliar Wetlands	Clearing	Western Australia	2016	Clearing of wetlands habitat and Aboriginal sacred sites for tollway construction. Following a blockade involving over 1000 people the project was cancelled.
Oyster Point	Land use	Queensland		
Magellan Metals	Lead poisoning			
Carmichael coal mine	Coal mining	Queensland	2019	potential impact upon the Great Barrier Reef, groundwater at its site and its carbon emissions.
Brigalow Land Development Fitzroy Basin Scheme	Clearing	Queensland	1962	4.5Mha of Brigalow vegetation was cleared for cropping and grazing. The brigalow cleared accounted for 21% of all brigalow vegetation in Australia. This scheme caused major runoff into catchments. Only 10% of this vegetation remains today with clearing still continuing at a lesser extent.

== See also ==
- Fusion Party
- List of environmental issues
- List of environmental issues in Victoria
- List of environmental issues in Western Australia
- List of threatened flora of Australia
- Litter in Australia
- Odour pollution in Australia
- Recycling in Australia
- Sustainable Australia Party
- Timbarra Gold Mine – a highly controversial gold mine
- World Uranium Hearing
