= Rosslyn Hill Mining =

Mining company based in Perth, Western Australia

- Formerly: Magellan Metals
- Type: Subsidiary
- Industry: Mining
- Founded: 1996
- Parent: LeadFX Inc
- Website: rosslynhillmining.com.au

Rosslyn Hill Mining, formerly Magellan Metals, operates Paroo Station Mine in Wiluna, Western Australia.

Rosslyn Hill Mining is a subsidiary of Canadian based company LeadFX, with an office in Perth, Western Australia. LeadFX is an international base metals mining, exploration and development company that was formerly listed on the Toronto Stock Exchange.

Paroo Station Mine is an open cut cerussite (lead carbonate) mine and concentrating facility. During operations, lead concentrate was transported by road and rail to the Port of Fremantle in sealed shipping containers, then shipped to overseas markets.

In November 2015, Ivernia Inc and Geo Zone Exploration Limited signed a merger agreement, and on 23 February 2016 rebranded as LeadFX. Rosslyn Hill Mining is a subsidiary of LeadFX and continues to operate Paroo Station Mine.

== History ==
The company was formerly known as Magellan Metals, first registered in 1996. The company has faced challenges with operating and transporting lead to export markets.

=== Esperance lead issue ===
Following the reported deaths of native birds at Esperance in Western Australia between December 2006 and March 2007, it was discovered that lead being exported through the town's port had caused or contributed to their deaths.

On 12 March 2007, the board of the Esperance Port Authority put an immediate stop to any further shipments of lead carbonate through the port.

A parliamentary inquiry into the event was instigated and investigated the bird deaths, high blood-lead levels in Esperance residents, and the contamination of the town's water tanks was published in November 2007. It found that the issues were complex and involved multiple parties, including the Esperance Port Authority and the Department of Environment & Conservation (DEC).

The DEC subsequently instigated legal action against the Esperance Port Authority on various matters relating to polluting the Esperance town site. The port entered a guilty plea on most charges in October 2009 and was fined $525,000 under the WA Environmental Protection Act 1986, the biggest fine ever under the Act.

The Government of Western Australia spent an estimated $20 million on the cleanup in Esperance. Magellan agreed to make a voluntary contribution of $9 million towards the cleanup of Esperance and separate $1 million for community projects in the town.

=== Sealed shipment process ===
In August 2009, after extensive community and government consultation, Magellan Metals obtained final approvals to re-commence bagged and containerised sealed shipments of lead carbonate concentrate through the Port of Fremantle.

In late 2010, Magellan advised the Environmental Protection Authority (EPA) that airborne lead above baseline levels may have been identified within a small number of sealed containers. The Minister for Environment issued a stop order on 31 December 2010.

In early January 2011, the independent laboratory responsible for the testing confirmed that its results were incorrect and that no baseline levels had been exceeded. This position was confirmed by an independent expert commissioned by Magellan Metals and an independent review commissioned by the EPA. Both the government and Magellan Metals confirmed that there was no risk to the community from the transport operations.

In late February 2011, the government lifted the stop order to enable Magellan Metals to commence transporting again. However, after two further interruptions to the transport process involving a train misdirected down a non-approved rail spur and lead in mud on shipping containers in February and March 2011. The company's owner, Ivernia Inc, placed the Magellan Mine operations voluntarily into care and maintenance on 7 April 2011 to conduct an end-to-end review of operations. Western Australian government agencies conducted their own parallel investigations into the shipment process and issued Interim Conditions.

From April 2011 to July 2012, Magellan Metals undertook a complete review of its operating procedures to ensure the integrity of the sealed shipment process. Western Australian government agencies also investigated and reviewed the events of early 2011 and confirmed that Magellan Metals had not breached its operating conditions and no action would be taken against the company.

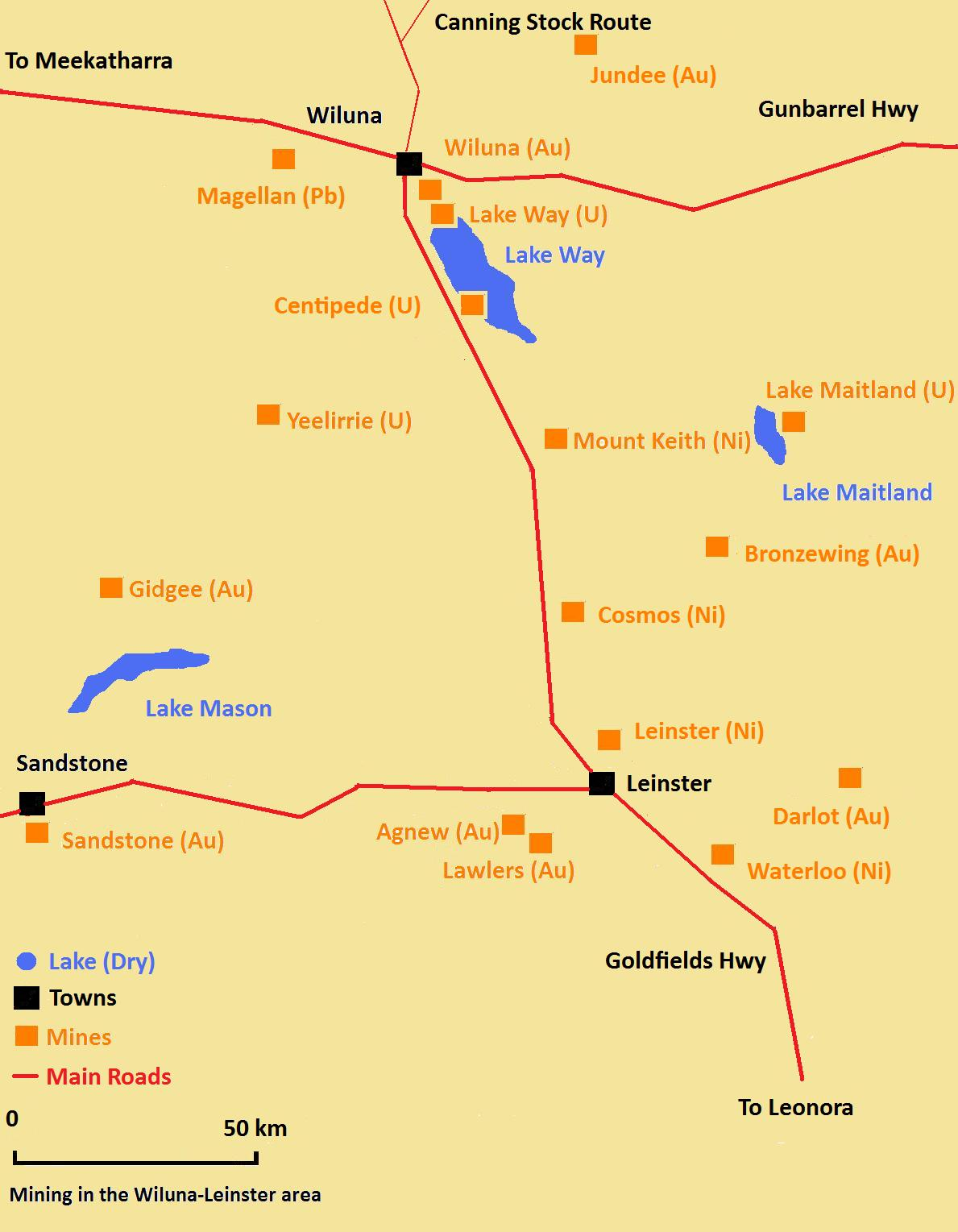
Mining in the Wiluna-Leinster area

On 27 July 2012, the Western Australian Minister for Environment approved updated operating conditions to enable Magellan Metals to recommence the export of lead carbonate concentrate via Fremantle Port.

The sealed shipment process used by Magellan Metals is a method of transporting concentrate in sealed, doubled lined bags inside locked steel shipping on rail from the mine site near Wiluna to the port.

As part of the process for approving the updated operating conditions, the minister received advice from the EPA that "the current transport and handling methods are more than sufficient to protect human health and the environment", and that "The transportation of bulk bags in shipping containers is over and above what is required and is best practice".

The sealed shipment process was developed following issues with the bulk loading of lead carbonate concentrate at the Esperance Port in 2006/07, which resulted in fugitive dust emissions, and the Magellan Mine being placed on care and maintenance in 2007.

=== New approval ===
A new ministerial statement, Statement 905 (MS905), was issued by the EPA on 27 July 2012, superseding all previous ministerial statements and focused entirely on the transport route. All conditions related to the transport of lead concentrate in sieve proof bags, sealed in locked shipping containers and the comprehensive compliance program.

=== New name ===
On 13 November 2012, Magellen Metals changed its name to Rosslyn Hill Mining Pty Ltd, and at the same time, Magellan Mine became Paroo Station Mine.

=== Enirgi Group Corporation takes over business management ===
On 17 December 2012, Ivernia Inc entered into a management services agreement with Enirgi Metal Group Pty Ltd (EMG), a wholly owned subsidiary of Enirgi Group Corporation. Enirgi Group is owed by the mining investment firm Sentient Group of Global Funds who has a majority stake in the TSX listed Ivernia Inc. Under the agreement, EMG will take the leading role in managing the restart of operations at the mine, including the design of the organizational structure, as well as responsibility for the day-to-day management of the operation of the mine following restart.

=== Restart ===
Roslyn Hill Mining started export of stockpiled lead concentrate in April 2013, and by May 2013, had achieved full mining and processing of lead ore.

=== Care and maintenance again ===
In January 2015, a decision was made to place Paroo Station Mine into full care and maintenance due to depressed global lead prices combined with high treatment charges. The mine ceased operations on 15 February 2015. The last containers of lead concentrate departed the Port of Fremantle on 24 February 2015.

=== Ivernia Inc to LeadFX ===
On 23 February 2016, Ivernia Inc announced it had rebranded to LeadFX Inc.

=== Extension of Fremantle port access ===
In November 2016, after an extensive consultation process, Rosslyn Hill Mine received an extension to 2024 for access to the Port of Fremantle to export lead concentrate using the company's best-practice concentrate transportation process. A new ministerial statement, MS1042, was also issued to cover this extension. Ministerial Statement 905 will continue to be in force. For owner LeadFX securing port access is a critical step in the preparations for a potential restart of the Paroo Station Mine in Western Australia.

=== New technology ===
LeadFX announced a technology deal with InCoR Technologies (a subsidiary of InCoR Holdings) on 12 May 2017 to conduct a definitive feasibility study (DFS) to design and build a hydrometallurgical facility at Rosslyn Hill Mining's Paroo Station Mine. This deal follows extensive negotiations with InCoR and The Sentient Group which began in early 2016. The facility would process lead ore into lead ingots, potentially extending the mine life to 15+ years and completely removing the environmental risks associated with shipping lead concentrate. The DFS on the facility has been commenced by SNC-Lavalin(now called AtkinsRéalis as of 2023) and solely funded by InCoR. InCoR will receive 40% of LeadFX should the study prove to be a success. This ends the consultation process which began in June 2016.

=== Termination of management agreement ===
On 18 August 2017, as a result of the InCoR deal LeadFX announced it was giving 90 days' notice of termination of the management services agreement with Enirgi Group Services Australasia Pty Ltd and Enirgi Group Inc (both wholly owned subsidiaries of the Sentient Group of Global Funds, majority shareholder of LeadFX). Under the agreement signed in December 2012, Enirgi managed the day-to-day affairs of LeadFX and its subsidiary Rosslyn Hill Mining providing necessary employees in accounting, finance, human resources, risk management and other day to day matters. The termination will result in changes to the board including CEO and CFO.

=== New CEO ===
The termination of the management agreement meant the end of Rob Scargill's position as CEO of LeadFX as he was directly employed by Enirgi Group. On 29 September 2017, Andrew Worland was announced as his replacement. Worland was previously CEO of uranium miner Toro Energy, based in Western Australia.

=== Going private ===
On 23 July 2018, LeadFX announced a going private transaction, effectively starting the process to de-list from the Toronto Stock Exchange. The company formally delisted from the Toronto Stock Exchange on 9 May 2019.

=== EPA recommends project ===
On 2 August 2018, the EPA recommended to the WA Environment Minister that the project go ahead due to reduced environmental risk with shipping ingots.

On 25 September 2018, Minister Stephen Dawson signed off on Ministerial Statement 1083, which superseded all previous statements. Statement 1083 retains the MS 905 transport route conditions and also adds the hydrometallurgical plant and 400ha to the development envelope for new 15-year mine life.

=== Update to definitive feasibility study ===
On 19 February 2019, LeadFX announced the proposed modifications to the hydro-metallurgical plant can produce 99.9999% pure lead metal. The four nines attract an additional purity payment. The life of the mine, based on proven and probable ore reserves, has been extended to 17 years (from the 15 years announced in the original DFS) as a result of including the ore reserves at the Pizarro deposit, located 10 km to the south of the mine-site, in the life of mine plan.

=== More funding ===
17 April 2020, InCoR Holdings announced a further 2 million CA to fund LeadFX as part of its drive to develop the 100% owned Rosslyn Hill Mining Pty Ltd Paroo Station Mine. LeadFX is also exploring the used lead acid battery market and is in the process of costing up refurbishments to its processing plant. Paroo Station has produced over 464,000 tonnes of concentrate containing over 300,000 tonnes of lead, and was placed on care and maintenance in first quarter 2015. It is fully permitted to recommence concentrate production and export activities, and to produce lead ingots through additional on-site downstream hydrometallurgical facilities using the company's exclusive sub-license of lead processing technologies from InCoR Technologies Limited. The company intends to pursue on-site processing of lead concentrate to produce LME grade lead ingots (via an onsite smelter currently under a DFS) as a second phase development.

=== Wiluna West Iron Ore Project ===
On October 22, 2020, GWR Group and their mining contractor Pilbara Resources Group signed an infrastructure agreement with Rosslyn Hill Mining to utilize the Paroo Station Mine accommodation camp and other infrastructure to develop the Wiluna West Iron Ore Project located 22 km due south of Paroo Station Mine. This brings much needed income to the cash strapped Rosslyn Hill Mining, in care and maintenance since February 2015.

=== New CEO ===
In March 2023, Andrew Worland stepped down as CEO of LeadFX the parent company of Rosslyn Hill Mining to concentrate on his roles as managing director and CEO of International Graphite which he took up in October 2022. Mr Worland was replaced by former Axiom Mining CEO Ryan Mount in June 2023.

=== Administrators called in ===
Rosslyn Hill Mining was placed in voluntary administration on 3 December 2024, after languishing in care and maintenance since 2015 and after LeadFXs failed funding attempts for its AUD 180-million-dollar hydrometallurgical plant, despite a successful feasibility study and holding all environmental approvals. The approval to export lead concentrate through the Port of Fremantle expires after 2024, leaving the company without viable access to the market.

=== Deed of Company Arrangement ===
Rosslyn Hill Mining ended administration and a deed of company arrangement was entered into on 11 March 2025 to service creditors. Rosslyn Hill Mining continues to conduct a feasibility study on a conventional smelter on site to produce lead ingots.

=== Tentative Restart ===
Rosslyn Hill Mining announced on their website a restart date of 2028 pending the outcome of a DFS
