= Industrial fire =

Disaster involving a conflagration in an industrial setting

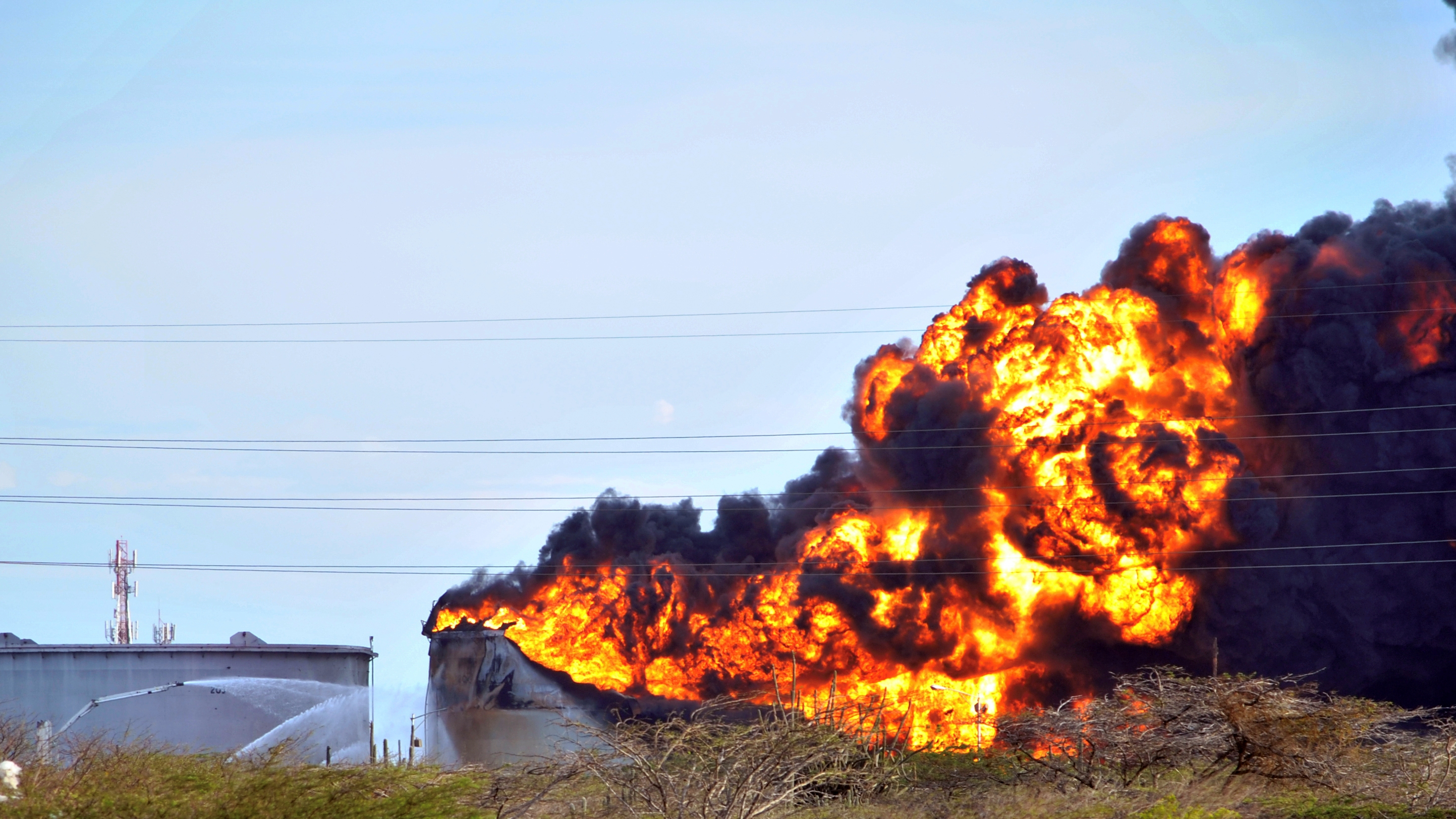
Oil tank burning after the 2012 Amuay refinery explosion.

An industrial fire is a type of industrial disaster involving a conflagration which occurs in an industrial setting. Industrial fires often, but not always, occur together with explosions. They are most likely to occur in facilities where there is a lot of flammable material present. Such material can include petroleum, petroleum products such as petrochemicals, or natural gas. Processing flammable materials such as hydrocarbons in units at high temperature and/or high pressure makes the hazards more severe. Facilities with such combustible material include oil refineries, tank farms (oil depots), natural gas processing plants, and chemical plants, particularly petrochemical plants. Such facilities often have their own fire departments for firefighting. Sometimes dust or powder are vulnerable to combustion and their ignition can cause dust explosions. Severe industrial fires have involved multiple injuries, loss of life, costly financial loss, and/or damage to the surrounding community or environment.

Process Hazard Analysis (PHA) is a set of organized and systematic assessments of the potential hazards for an industrial process used to analyze potential causes and consequences of fires, explosions, releases of toxic or flammable chemicals, and major spills of hazardous chemicals.
