= Environmental Protection Authority (Western Australia) =

Department of government of Western Australia

Statutory Authority overview
- Formed: 1 January 1972
- Jurisdiction: Government of Western Australia
- Headquarters: Prime House, 8 Davidson Terrace Joondalup, WA 6027
- Minister responsible: Reece Whitby, Minister for Environment
- Statutory Authority executive: Lee McIntosh, Acting Chair
- Parent Statutory Authority: Department of Water and Environmental Regulation
- Website: www.epa.wa.gov.au

The Environmental Protection Authority (EPA) is a statutory authority within the Government of Western Australia. Established on 1 January 1972, it comprises an independent board who provide public environmental advice to the government and is supported by the Department of Water and Environmental Regulation.

The EPA provides advice to the Minister for Environment through various reports, as well as releasing statements to the public detailing significant environmental matters. Its role also includes formulation of environmental protection policies.

== History ==
The Tonkin government passed the Environmental Protection Act 1971, creating an independent environmental authority on 1 January 1972.

The 1971 act was subsequently replaced by the Environmental Protection Act 1986.

On 27 November 2009 the Western Australian Government formed a dedicated department to support the EPA, known as the Office of the Environmental Protection Authority (OEPA), in order to provide the Authority with greater independence and control of its policies and processes.

On 1 July 2017, OEPA was amalgamated with the Department of Environment Regulation and the Department of Water to form the Department of Water and Environmental Regulation.

== Description ==
The authority consists of five members: a full-time chair, a part-time deputy chair, and three other part-time members. Members of the EPA board are not public servants. They are appointed by the Governor of Western Australia on the recommendation of the Minister for Environment. Unusually for a government authority, under the Environmental Protection Act 1986, neither the Authority or its chairman are subject to the direction of the Minister.

The OEPA provides support services such as negotiating with stakeholders and proponents, technical advice regarding the formulation of policies, research and formulation of reports, and monitoring of project implementation.

The authority operates and has statutory powers under the Environmental Protection Act 1986 and as amended by the Environmental Protection Amendment Bill 2002.
