= List of Banksia species =

Species accepted by the Australian Plant Census

The following is a list of Banksia species accepted by the Australian Plant Census as at March 2020, with the addition of the fossil species B. archaeocarpa, B. kingii, B. longicarpa, B. microphylla, B. novae-zelandiae, B. paleocrypta and B. strahanensis.

- Banksia acanthopoda (A.S.George) A.R.Mast & K.R.Thiele (W.A.)
- Banksia aculeata A.S.George - prickly banksia (W.A.)
- Banksia acuminata A.R.Mast & K.R.Thiele (W.A.)
- Banksia aemula R.Br. - wallum banksia (Qld., N.S.W.)
- Banksia alliacea A.R.Mast & K.R.Thiele (W.A.)
- Banksia anatona (A.S.George) A.R.Mast & K.R.Thiele - cactus dryandra (W.A.)
- Banksia aquilonia (A.S.George) A.S.George - northern banksia, jingana (Qld.)
- Banksia arborea (C.A.Gardner) A.R.Mast & K.R.Thiele – Yilgarn dryandra (W.A.)
- Banksia archaeocarpa McNamara & Scott (fossil)
- Banksia arctotidis (R.Br.) A.R.Mast & K.R.Thiele (W.A.)
- Banksia armata (R.Br.) A.R.Mast & K.R.Thiele - prickly dryandra (W.A.)
  - Banksia armata var. armata
  - Banksia armata var. ignicida (A.S.George) A.R.Mast & K.R.Thiele
- Banksia ashbyi Baker f. - Ashby's banksia (W.A.)
  - Banksia ashbyi subsp. ashbyi
  - Banksia ashbyi subsp. boreoscaia A.S.George
- Banksia attenuata R.Br. - candlestick banksia, slender banksia, biara (W.A.)
- Banksia audax C.A.Gardner (W.A.)
- Banksia aurantia (A.S.George) A.R.Mast & K.R.Thiele - orange dryandra (W.A.)
- Banksia baueri R.Br. - woolly banksia (W.A.)
- Banksia baxteri R.Br. - Baxter's banksia, bird's nest banksia (W.A.)
- Banksia bella A.R.Mast & K.R.Thiele - Wongan dryandra (W.A.)
- Banksia benthamiana C.A.Gardner (W.A.)
- Banksia bipinnatifida (R.Br.) A.R.Mast & K.R.Thiele (W.A.)
  - Banksia bipinnatifida subsp. bipinnatifida
  - Banksia bipinnatifida subsp. multifida (A.S.George) A.R.Mast & K.R.Thiele
- Banksia biterax A.R.Mast & K.R.Thiele (W.A.)
- Banksia blechnifolia F.Muell. (W.A.)
- Banksia borealis (A.S.George) A.R.Mast & K.R.Thiele (W.A.)
  - Banksia borealis subsp. borealis
  - Banksia borealis subsp. elatior (A.S.George) A.R.Mast & K.R.Thiele
- Banksia brownii Baxter ex R.Br. - Brown's banksia, feather-leaved banksia (W.A.)
- Banksia brunnea A.R.Mast & K.R.Thiele (W.A.)
- Banksia burdettii Baker f. - Burdett's banksia (W.A.)
- Banksia caleyi R.Br. - Cayley's banksia, red lantern banksia (W.A.)
- Banksia calophylla (R.Br.) A.R.Mast & K.R.Thiele (W.A.)
- Banksia candolleana Meisn. - propeller banksia (W.A.)
- Banksia canei J.H.Willis - mountain banksia (N.S.W., Vic)
- Banksia carlinoides (Meisn.) A.R.Mast & K.R.Thiele – pink dryandra (W.A.)
- Banksia catoglypta (A.S.George) A.R.Mast & K.R.Thiele (W.A.)
- Banksia chamaephyton A.S.George - fishbone banksia (W.A.)
- Banksia cirsioides (Meisn.) A.R.Mast & K.R.Thiele (W.A.)
- Banksia coccinea R.Br. - scarlet banksia, waratah banksia, Albany banksia (W.A.)
- Banksia columnaris (A.S.George) A.R.Mast & K.R.Thiele (W.A.)
- Banksia comosa (Meisn.) A.R.Mast & K.R.Thiele (W.A.)
- Banksia concinna (R.Br.) A.R.Mast & K.R.Thiele (W.A.)
- Banksia conferta A.S.George - glasshouse banksia (Qld., N.S.W.)
- Banksia corvijuga (A.S.George) A.R.Mast & K.R.Thiele (W.A.)
- Banksia croajingolensis Molyneux & Forrester – Gippsland banksia (Vic.)
- Banksia cuneata A.S.George - matchstick banksia, Quairading banksia (W.A.)
- Banksia cynaroides (C.A.Gardner) A.R.Mast & K.R.Thiele (W.A.)
- Banksia cypholoba (A.S.George) A.R.Mast & K.R.Thiele (W.A.)
- Banksia dallanneyi A.R.Mast & K.R.Thiele – couch honeypot (W.A.)
  - Banksia dallanneyi subsp. agricola (A.S.George) A.R.Mast & K.R.Thiele
  - Banksia dallanneyi subsp. dallanneyi
  - Banksia dallanneyi var. dallanneyi
  - Banksia dallanneyi var. mellicula (A.S.George) A.R.Mast & K.R.Thiele
  - Banksia dallanneyi subsp. media (A.S.George) A.R.Mast & K.R.Thiele
  - Banksia dallanneyi subsp. pollosta (A.S.George) A.R.Mast & K.R.Thiele
  - Banksia dallanneyi subsp. sylvestris (A.S.George) A.R.Mast & K.R.Thiele
- Banksia densa A.R.Mast & K.R.Thiele (W.A.)
  - Banksia densa var. densa
  - Banksia densa var. parva (A.S.George) A.R.Mast & K.R.Thiele
  - Banksia densa var. Wheatbelt
- Banksia dentata L.f. - tropical banksia (W.A., N.T., Qld.)
- Banksia drummondii (Meisn.) A.R.Mast & K.R.Thiele – Drummond's dryandra (W.A.)
  - Banksia drummondii subsp. drummondii
  - Banksia drummondii subsp. hiemalis (A.S.George) A.R.Mast & K.R.Thiele
  - Banksia drummondii subsp. macrorufa (A.S.George) A.R.Mast & K.R.Thiele
- Banksia dryandroides Baxter ex Sweet - dryandra-leaved banksia, manyat (W.A.)
- Banksia echinata (A.S.George) A.R.Mast & K.R.Thiele (W.A.)
- Banksia elderiana F.Muell. & Tate - swordfish banksia (W.A.)
- Banksia elegans Meisn. - elegant banksia (W.A.)
- Banksia epica A.S.George (W.A.)
- Banksia epimicta (A.S.George) A.R.Mast & K.R.Thiele (W.A.)
- Banksia ericifolia L.f. - heath-leaved banksia, lantern banksia (N.S.W.)
  - Banksia ericifolia subsp. ericifolia
  - Banksia ericifolia subsp. macrantha (A.S.George) A.S.George
- Banksia erythrocephala (C.A.Gardner) A.R.Mast & K.R.Thiele (W.A.)
  - Banksia erythrocephala var. erythrocephala
  - Banksia erythrocephala var. inopinata (A.S.George) A.R.Mast & K.R.Thiele
- Banksia falcata (R.Br.) A.R.Mast & K.R.Thiele – prickly dryandra (W.A.)
- Banksia fasciculata (A.S.George) A.R.Mast & K.R.Thiele (W.A.)
- Banksia fililoba (A.S.George) A.R.Mast & K.R.Thiele (W.A.)
- Banksia foliolata (R.Br.) A.R.Mast & K.R.Thiele (W.A.)
- Banksia foliosissima (C.A.Gardner) A.R.Mast & K.R.Thiele (W.A.)
- Banksia formosa (R.Br.) A.R.Mast & K.R.Thiele – showy dryandra (W.A.)
- Banksia fraseri (R.Br.) A.R.Mast & K.R.Thiele (W.A.)
  - Banksia fraseri var. ashbyi (B.L.Burtt) A.R.Mast & K.R.Thiele
  - Banksia fraseri var. crebra (A.S.George) A.R.Mast & K.R.Thiele
  - Banksia fraseri var. effusa (A.S.George) A.R.Mast & K.R.Thiele
  - Banksia fraseri var. fraseri (A.S.George) A.R.Mast & K.R.Thiele
  - Banksia fraseri var. oxycedra (A.S.George) A.R.Mast & K.R.Thiele
- Banksia fuscobractea (A.S.George) A.R.Mast & K.R.Thiele – dark-bract banksia (W.A.)
- Banksia gardneri A.S.George - prostrate banksia (W.A.)
  - Banksia gardneri var. brevidentata A.S.George
  - Banksia gardneri var. gardneri
  - Banksia gardneri var. hiemalis A.S.George
- Banksia glaucifolia A.R.Mast & K.R.Thiele (W.A.)
- Banksia goodii R.Br. - Good's banksia (W.A.)
- Banksia grandis Willd. - bull banksia, giant banksia, beera (W.A.)
- Banksia grossa A.S.George (W.A.)
- Banksia heliantha (A.S.George) A.R.Mast & K.R.Thiele – oak-leaved dryandra (W.A.)
- Banksia hewardiana (Meisn.) A.R.Mast & K.R.Thiele (W.A.)
- Banksia hirta A.R.Mast & K.R.Thiele (W.A.)
- Banksia hookeriana Meisn. - Hooker's banksia (W.A.)
- Banksia horrida (Meisn.) A.R.Mast & K.R.Thiele – prickly dryandra (W.A.)
- Banksia idiogenes (A.S.George) A.R.Mast & K.R.Thiele (W.A.)
- Banksia ilicifolia R.Br. - holly-leaved banksia (W.A.)
- Banksia incana A.S.George - hoary banksia (W.A.)
  - Banksia incana var. brachyphylla A.S.George
  - Banksia incana var. incana
- Banksia insulanemorecincta (A.S.George) A.R.Mast & K.R.Thiele (W.A.)
- Banksia integrifolia L.f. - coast banksia, white honeysuckle (Qld., N.S.W., Vic., Tas.)
  - Banksia integrifolia subsp. compar (R.Br.) K.R.Thiele
  - Banksia integrifolia subsp. integrifolia
  - Banksia integrifolia subsp. monticola K.R.Thiele
- Banksia ionthocarpa (A.S.George) A.R.Mast & K.R.Thiele (W.A.)
  - Banksia ionthocarpa subsp. chrysophoenix (A.S.George) A.R.Mast & K.R.Thiele
  - Banksia ionthocarpa subsp. ionthocarpa
- Banksia kingii Jordan & Hill (fossil)
- Banksia kippistiana (Meisn.) A.R.Mast & K.R.Thiele (W.A.)
  - Banksia kippistiana var. kippistiana
  - Banksia kippistiana var. paenepeccata (A.S.George) A.R.Mast & K.R.Thiele
- Banksia laevigata Meisn. - tennis ball banksia (W.A.)
  - Banksia laevigata subsp. fuscolutea A.S.George
  - Banksia laevigata subsp. laevigata
- Banksia lanata A.S.George - Coomallo banksia (W.A.)
- Banksia laricina C.A.Gardner - rose banksia, rose-fruited banksia (W.A.)
- Banksia lemanniana Meisn. - Lemann's banksia, yellow lantern banksia (W.A.)
- Banksia lepidorhiza (A.S.George) A.R.Mast & K.R.Thiele (W.A.)
- Banksia leptophylla A.S.George - slender leaved banksia (W.A.)
  - Banksia leptophylla var. leptophylla
  - Banksia leptophylla var. melletica A.S.George
- Banksia lindleyana Meisn. - porcupine banksia (W.A.)
- Banksia littoralis R.Br. - western swamp banksia, swamp banksia (W.A.)
- Banksia longicarpa Greenwood, Haines & Steart (fossil)
- Banksia lullfitzii C.A.Gardner (W.A.)
- Banksia marginata Cav. - silver banksia, warrock (S.A., N.S.W., A.C.T., Vic., Tas.)
- Banksia media R.Br. - southern plains banksia, golden stalk banksia (W.A.)
- Banksia meganotia (A.S.George) A.R.Mast & K.R.Thiele (W.A.)
- Banksia meisneri Lehm. - Meisner's banksia (W.A.)
  - Banksia meisneri subsp. ascendens (A.S.George) A.S.George
  - Banksia meisneri subsp. meisneri
- Banksia menziesii R.Br. - Menzies' banksia, firewood banksia (W.A.)
- Banksia micrantha A.S.George (W.A.)
- Banksia microphylla R.J.Carpenter & L.A.Milne
- Banksia mimica (A.S.George) A.R.Mast & K.R.Thiele (W.A.) - summer honeypot
- Banksia montana (C.A.Gardner ex A.S.George) A.R.Mast & K.R.Thiele (W.A.) - Stirling Range dryandra
- Banksia mucronulata (R.Br.) A.R.Mast & K.R.Thiele (W.A.) - swordfish dryandra
- Banksia nana (Meisn.) A.R.Mast & K.R.Thiele (W.A.) - dwarf dryandra
- Banksia neoanglica (A.S.George) Stimpson & J.J.Bruhl (Qld., N.S.W.) - New England banksia
- Banksia nivea Labill. (W.A.) - honeypot dryandra
  - Banksia nivea subsp. Morangup
  - Banksia nivea subsp. nivea
  - Banksia nivea subsp. uliginosa (A.S.George) A.R.Mast & K.R.Thiele
- Banksia nobilis (Lindl.) A.R.Mast & K.R.Thiele (W.A.)
  - Banksia nobilis subsp. fragrans (A.S.George) A.R.Mast & K.R.Thiele
  - Banksia nobilis subsp. nobilis
- Banksia novae-zelandiae R.J.Carp., G.J.Jord., D.E.Lee & R.S.Hill (fossil)
- Banksia nutans R.Br. - nodding banksia (W.A.)
  - Banksia nutans var. cernuella A.S.George
  - Banksia nutans var. nutans
- Banksia oblongifolia Cav. - rusty banksia, dwarf banksia (Qld. N.S.W.)
- Banksia obovata A.R.Mast & K.R.Thiele (W.A.)
- Banksia obtusa (R.Br.) A.R.Mast & K.R.Thiele
- Banksia occidentalis R.Br. - red swamp banksia, water bush banksia (W.A.)
- Banksia octotriginta (A.S.George) A.R.Mast & K.R.Thiele (W.A.)
- Banksia oligantha A.S.George - Wagin banksia (W.A.)
- Banksia oreophila A.S.George - western mountain banksia (W.A.)
- Banksia ornata F.Muell. ex Meisn. - desert banksia (S.A., Vic.)
- Banksia paleocrypta R.J.Carp. (fossil)
- Banksia pallida (A.S.George) A.R.Mast & K.R.Thiele (W.A.)
- Banksia paludosa R.Br. - swamp banksia, marsh banksia (N.S.W.)
  - Banksia paludosa subsp. astrolux A.S.George
  - Banksia paludosa subsp. paludosa
- Banksia pellaeifolia A.R.Mast & K.R.Thiele (W.A.)
- Banksia penicillata (A.S.George) K.R.Thiele (N.S.W.)
- Banksia petiolaris F.Muell. (W.A.)
- Banksia pilostylis C.A.Gardner (W.A.)
- Banksia plagiocarpa A.S.George - Dallachy's banksia, blue banksia, Hinchinbrook banksia (Qld.)
- Banksia platycarpa (A.S.George) A.R.Mast & K.R.Thiele (W.A.)
- Banksia plumosa (R.Br.) A.R.Mast & K.R.Thiele (W.A.)
  - Banksia plumosa subsp. denticulata (A.S.George) A.R.Mast & K.R.Thiele
  - Banksia plumosa subsp. plumosa
- Banksia polycephala (Benth.) A.R.Mast & K.R.Thiele (W.A.)
- Banksia porrecta (A.S.George) A.R.Mast & K.R.Thiele (W.A.)
- Banksia praemorsa Andrews - cut-leaf banksia (W.A.)
- Banksia prionophylla A.R.Mast & K.R.Thiele (W.A.)
- Banksia prionotes Lindl. - acorn banksia, orange banksia (W.A.)
- Banksia prolata A.R.Mast & K.R.Thiele (W.A.)
  - Banksia prolata subsp. archeos (A.S.George) A.R.Mast & K.R.Thiele
  - Banksia prolata subsp. calcicola (A.S.George) A.R.Mast & K.R.Thiele
  - Banksia prolata subsp. prolata
- Banksia proteoides (Lindl.) A.R.Mast & K.R.Thiele (W.A.)
- Banksia pseudoplumosa (A.S.George) A.R.Mast & K.R.Thiele (W.A.)
- Banksia pteridifolia (R.Br.) A.R.Mast & K.R.Thiele (W.A.)
  - Banksia pteridifolia subsp. inretita (A.S.George) A.R.Mast & K.R.Thiele
  - Banksia pteridifolia subsp. pteridifolia
  - Banksia pteridifolia subsp. vernalis (A.S.George) A.R.Mast & K.R.Thiele
- Banksia pulchella R.Br. - teasel banksia, dainty banksia (W.A.)
- Banksia purdieana (Diels) A.R.Mast & K.R.Thiele (W.A.)
- Banksia quercifolia R.Br. - oak-leaved banksia (W.A.)
- Banksia recurvistylis K.R.Thiele (W.A.)
- Banksia repens Labill. - creeping banksia (W.A.)
- Banksia robur Cav. - eastern swamp banksia, swamp banksia, broad-leaved banksia (Qld., N.S.W.)
- Banksia rosserae Olde & Marriott (W.A.)
- Banksia rufa A.R.Mast & K.R.Thiele (W.A.)
  - Banksia rufa subsp. chelomacarpa (A.S.George) A.R.Mast & K.R.Thiele
  - Banksia rufa subsp. flavescens (A.S.George) A.R.Mast & K.R.Thiele
  - Banksia rufa subsp. magna (A.S.George) A.R.Mast & K.R.Thiele
  - Banksia rufa subsp. obliquiloba (A.S.George) A.R.Mast & K.R.Thiele
  - Banksia rufa subsp. pumila (A.S.George) A.R.Mast & K.R.Thiele
  - Banksia rufa subsp. rufa
  - Banksia rufa subsp. tutanningensis (A.S.George) A.R.Mast & K.R.Thiele
- Banksia rufistylis (A.S.George) A.R.Mast & K.R.Thiele (W.A.)
- Banksia saxicola A.S.George - Grampians banksia, rock banksia (Vic.)
- Banksia scabrella A.S.George - Burma Road banksia (W.A.)
- Banksia sceptrum Meisn. - sceptre banksia (W.A.)
- Banksia sclerophylla (Meisn.) A.R.Mast & K.R.Thiele (W.A.)
- Banksia seminuda (A.S.George) Rye - river banksia (W.A.)
- Banksia seneciifolia (R.Br.) A.R.Mast & K.R.Thiele (W.A.)
- Banksia serra (R.Br.) A.R.Mast & K.R.Thiele (W.A.)
- Banksia serrata L.f. - saw banksia, red honeysuckle, old man banksia (Qld., N.S.W., Vic., Tas.)
- Banksia serratuloides (Meisn.) A.R.Mast & K.R.Thiele (W.A.)
  - Banksia serratuloides subsp. perissa (A.S.George) A.R.Mast & K.R.Thiele
  - Banksia serratuloides subsp. serratuloides
- Banksia sessilis (Knight) A.R.Mast & K.R.Thiele - parrot bush (W.A.)
  - Banksia sessilis var. cordata (Meisn.) A.R.Mast & K.R.Thiele
  - Banksia sessilis var. cygnorum (Gand.) A.R.Mast & K.R.Thiele
  - Banksia sessilis var. flabellifolia (A.S.George) A.R.Mast & K.R.Thiele
  - Banksia sessilis var. sessilis
- Banksia shanklandiorum (Randall) A.R.Mast & K.R.Thiele (W.A.)
- Banksia shuttleworthiana (Meisn.) A.R.Mast & K.R.Thiele (W.A.)
- Banksia solandri R.Br. - Stirling Range banksia, Solander's banksia (W.A.)
- Banksia speciosa R.Br. - showy banksia (W.A.)
- Banksia sphaerocarpa R.Br. - fox banksia, round-fruited banksia (W.A.)
  - Banksia sphaerocarpa var. caesia A.S.George
  - Banksia sphaerocarpa var. dolichostyla A.S.George
  - Banksia sphaerocarpa var. latifolia F.Muell. ex Benth.
  - Banksia sphaerocarpa var. pumilio A.S.George
  - Banksia sphaerocarpa var. sphaerocarpa
- Banksia spinulosa Sm. - hairpin banksia (Qld., N.S.W., Vic.)
  - Banksia spinulosa var. collina (R.Br.) A.S.George
  - Banksia spinulosa var. cunninghamii (Sieber ex Rchb. A.S.George
  - Banksia spinulosa var. spinulosa
- Banksia splendida A.R.Mast & K.R.Thiele (W.A.)
  - Banksia splendida subsp. macrocarpa (A.S.George) A.R.Mast & K.R.Thiele
  - Banksia splendida subsp. splendida
- Banksia squarrosa (R.Br.) A.R.Mast & K.R.Thiele (W.A.)
  - Banksia squarrosa subsp. argillacea (A.S.George) A.R.Mast & K.R.Thiele
  - Banksia squarrosa subsp. squarrosa
- Banksia stenoprion (Meisn.) A.R.Mast & K.R.Thiele (W.A.)
- Banksia strahanensis Jordan & Hill (fossil)
- Banksia strictifolia A.R.Mast & K.R.Thiele (W.A.)
- Banksia stuposa (Lindl.) A.R.Mast & K.R.Thiele (W.A.)
- Banksia subpinnatifida (C.A.Gardner) A.R.Mast & K.R.Thiele (W.A.)
  - Banksia subpinnatifida var. imberbis (A.S.George) A.R.Mast & K.R.Thiele
  - Banksia subpinnatifida var. subpinnatifida
- Banksia subulata (C.A.Gardner) A.R.Mast & K.R.Thiele (W.A.)
- Banksia telmatiaea A.S.George - swamp fox banksia (W.A.)
- Banksia tenuis A.R.Mast & K.R.Thiele (W.A.)
  - Banksia tenuis var. reptans (A.S.George) A.R.Mast & K.R.Thiele
  - Banksia tenuis var. tenuis
- Banksia tortifolia (Kippist ex Meisn.) A.R.Mast & K.R.Thiele (W.A.)
- Banksia tricuspis Meisn. - Lesueur banksia, pine banksia (W.A.)
- Banksia tridentata (Meisn.) B.D.Jacks. (W.A.)
- Banksia trifontinalis (A.S.George) A.R.Mast & K.R.Thiele (W.A.)
- Banksia undata A.R.Mast & K.R.Thiele (W.A.)
  - Banksia undata var. splendens (A.S.George) A.R.Mast & K.R.Thiele
  - Banksia undata var. undata
- Banksia verticillata R.Br. - granite banksia, Albany banksia (W.A.)
- Banksia vestita (Kippist ex Meisn.) A.R.Mast & K.R.Thiele (W.A.)
- Banksia victoriae Meisn. - woolly orange banksia (W.A.)
- Banksia vincentia Stimpson & P.H.Weston (N.S.W.)
- Banksia violacea C.A.Gardner - violet banksia (W.A.)
- Banksia viscida (A.S.George) A.R.Mast & K.R.Thiele (W.A.)
- Banksia wonganensis (A.S.George) A.R.Mast & K.R.Thiele (W.A.)
- Banksia xylothemelia (A.S.George) A.R.Mast & K.R.Thiele (W.A.)

== See also ==
- Taxonomy of Banksia
