= Banksia paleocrypta =

Scientific classification
- Kingdom: Plantae
- Clade: Tracheophytes
- Clade: Angiosperms
- Clade: Eudicots
- Order: Proteales
- Family: Proteaceae
- Genus: Banksia
- Species: †B. paleocrypta

Binomial name
- †Banksia paleocrypta R. Carpenter, 2014

Extinct species of flowering plant

Banksia paleocrypta is an extinct species of Banksia in the family Proteaceae. The species is known from silcretes deposits from the Walebing and Kojonup regions of southwestern Australia dating to the Late Eocene. This species is the oldest fossil in the genus Banksia with evidence of stomata and trichomes, characteristics of xerophytes which are adapted to survive in environments with very little water. These traits slow water loss in arid climates. However Banksia paleocrypta is of special interest because it is dated 25 million years prior to the widely accepted timing for the onset of aridity that expanded globally during the Neogene.

== Etymology ==
The specific name 'paleocrypta' was given in recognition of the fossilized leaves having stomatal pits, also known as crypts.

== Description ==
Banksia paleocrypta is known from fossilized leaves that are thick and regularly serrated with prominent veins. It is believed to have occupied sunny but very infertile areas among other sclerophyllous plants

== Classification ==
Molecular phylogenetic analysis suggests that the two subgenera of Banksia split during the Middle Eocene, over 40 million years ago. Banksia paleocrypta is similar to two other Banksia species, B. menziesii and B. burdettii, however the clade of these two species has an estimated age of only 2 million years.
