= Banksia croajingolensis =

Gippsland banksia

Scientific classification
- Kingdom: Plantae
- Clade: Tracheophytes
- Clade: Angiosperms
- Clade: Eudicots
- Order: Proteales
- Family: Proteaceae
- Genus: Banksia
- Species: B. croajingolensis

Binomial name
- Banksia croajingolensis Molyneux & Forrester

Species of plant endemic to Victoria, Australia

Banksia croajingolensis, commonly known as the Gippsland banksia, is a species of small shrub that is endemic to a small area in Victoria, Australia. It is known from fewer than 500 plants growing along a single drainage line in the Croajingolong National Park.

== Description ==
Banksia croajingolensis is usually a small, spreading shrub that typically grows to 35–60 cm (14–24 in) high, 45–120 cm (18–47 in) wide, forms a lignotuber and produces suckers. It has narrow egg-shaped leaves, narrower at the base, 16–60 mm (0.63–2.36 in) long and 5–17 mm (0.20–0.67 in) wide. The leaves are dark green on the upper surface, covered with white hairs on the lower surface and sometimes have a few short teeth on the edges. The flowers are yellow, borne on a spike 70–140 mm (2.8–5.5 in) long and 4–55 mm (0.16–2.17 in) wide when the flowers open. Each flower has a perianth 15–18 mm (0.59–0.71 in) long a pistil 15–26 mm (0.59–1.02 in) long. Flowering occurs from June to August and the fruit is an elliptical follicle 13–19 mm (0.51–0.75 in) long, 3–5 mm (0.12–0.20 in) high and 5–6 mm (0.20–0.24 in) that usually open when mature.

This banksia is similar in appearance to B. paludosa (swamp banksia), and to a lesser extent B. integrifolia (coast banksia) and B. marginata (silver banksia). However it differs from these species in having flowers that open from the top of the inflorescence, rather than from the bottom up. It is also known to hybridise with B. integrifolia.

== Taxonomy ==
The Gippsland banksia was first formally described in 2007 by Bill Molyneux and Susan G. Forrester, based on specimens they collected above Shipwreck Creek in Croajingolong National Park on 24 August 2005. The specific epithet is from Croajingolong, an English corruption of Krowathunkoolong, the Gunai name for the region in which the species occurs, and -ensis, a Latin suffix meaning "originating from". The specific epithet croajingolongensis was unappealing, so Molyneux and Forrester followed the lead of Lawrie Johnson and Ken Hill, who used the contracted form croajingolensis when they published Eucalyptus croajingolensis in 1990.

Molyneux and Forrester did not attempt an infrageneric placement for B. croajingolensis, but noted that all characters except the flowering sequence are consistent with its placement within B. sect. Banksia in George's taxonomic arrangement of Banksia. There was no attempt to place it within the phylogenetics-informed arrangement of Kevin Thiele and Pauline Ladiges.

== Distribution and habitat ==
Banksia croajingolensis is known to occur only along a single drainage line in coastal heathland above the south bank of Shipwreck Creek in Croajingolong National Park, East Gippsland. About 480 individual plants are known.

== Conservation status ==
The species has not been formally assessed for the IUCN Red List, but Molyneux and Forrester assessed it against the Red List criteria as warranting "Vulnerable" ranking, because of its small population size and its restricted range.
