= Banksia microphylla =

Banksia microphylla Temporal range: Late Eocene

Scientific classification
- Kingdom: Plantae
- Clade: Tracheophytes
- Clade: Angiosperms
- Clade: Eudicots
- Order: Proteales
- Family: Proteaceae
- Genus: Banksia
- Species: †B. microphylla

Binomial name
- †Banksia microphylla R.J.Carpenter & L.A.Milne

Extinct species of Australian plant

Banksia microphylla is an extinct species of shrub known from leaf fossils in Western Australia. The leaf fossils are the first known in the genus Banksia to show extreme narrowness, at less than 1.5 mm wide. They were collected from samples in the Zanthus-11 borehole, at about 38 metres (125 ft) deep, on the western margin of the Eucla Basin. It was described to the subgenus Spathulatae because of its diffusely placed stomata.
