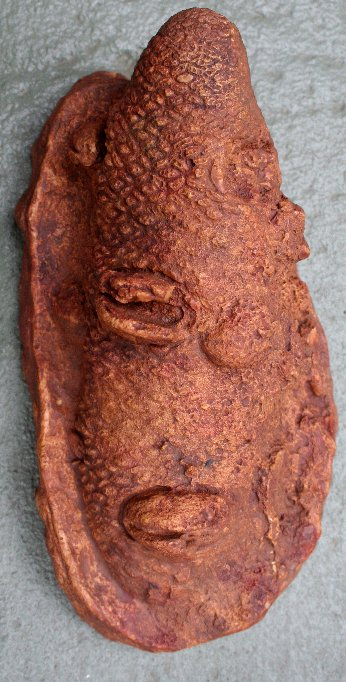

Scientific classification
- Kingdom: Plantae
- Clade: Tracheophytes
- Clade: Angiosperms
- Clade: Eudicots
- Order: Proteales
- Family: Proteaceae
- Genus: Banksia
- Species: †B. archaeocarpa

Binomial name
- †Banksia archaeocarpa McNamara & Scott

= Banksia archaeocarpa =

Banksia archaeocarpa Temporal range: Middle Eocene

Extinct species of plant found in Australia

Banksia archaeocarpa is an extinct species of tree or shrub, known only from a fossil Banksia "cone" recovered from rocks known as the Merlinleigh Sandstone from the Middle Eocene (48 to 38 million years ago), found in the Kennedy Range in Western Australia. Described in 1983 by Ken McNamara, it closely resembles the extant B. attenuata (candlestick banksia), with the flowers spirally arranged. Some leaves resembling Banksia brownii (feather-leaved banksia) were discovered at the same site but it is unclear whether or not they were from the same plant.

A cast of the fossil cone is on display at the Western Australian Museum.

Today, the Kennedy Range lies far to the north of the distribution of most banksias. The only Banksia species found there is B. ashbyi (Ashby's banksia), the northernmost of all western banksias.

A fossil banksia cone comparable to B. archaeocarpa, named Banksia longicarpa has also been described from Miocene age specimens collected near Marree in northern South Australia, also well outside the current distribution of Banksia.
