= Banksia longicarpa =

Banksia longicarpa Temporal range: Miocene

Scientific classification
- Kingdom: Plantae
- Clade: Tracheophytes
- Clade: Angiosperms
- Clade: Eudicots
- Order: Proteales
- Family: Proteaceae
- Genus: Banksia
- Species: †B. longicarpa

Binomial name
- †Banksia longicarpa Greenwood, Haines & Steart

Extinct species of plant found in Australia

Banksia longicarpa is an extinct species of tree or shrub, known from fossil Banksia "cones" recovered from rocks at Poole Creek and Woomera in northern South Australia. Its elongate woody axis with prominent follicles resemble the fruiting cone of the living species Banksia serrata.
