= Eucalyptus croajingolensis =

East Gippsland peppermint

Scientific classification
- Kingdom: Plantae
- Clade: Tracheophytes
- Clade: Angiosperms
- Clade: Eudicots
- Clade: Rosids
- Order: Myrtales
- Family: Myrtaceae
- Genus: Eucalyptus
- Species: E. croajingolensis

Binomial name
- Eucalyptus croajingolensis L.A.S.Johnson & K.D.Hill

Species of eucalyptus

Eucalyptus croajingolensis, commonly known as the East Gippsland peppermint or Gippsland peppermint, is a species of tree that is endemic to southeastern Australia. It has rough, short-fibrous bark on the trunk and larger branches, sometimes smooth bark on the thinner branches, lance-shaped to curved adult leaves, flower buds in groups of nine or more, white flowers and hemispherical to cup-shaped fruit.

== Description ==
Eucalyptus croajingolensis is a tree that typically grows to a height of 30 m (98 ft) and forms a lignotuber. It has rough, grey or brownish short-fibrous bark on the trunk and branches, sometimes smooth white or grey bark on the thinner branches. Young plants and coppice regrowth have sessile, lance-shaped to egg-shaped leaves arranged in opposite pairs, 40–90 mm (1.6–3.5 in) long and 13–32 mm (0.51–1.26 in) wide. Adult leaves are arranged alternately, the same dull bluish or green colour on both sides, lance-shaped to curved, 80–180 mm (3.1–7.1 in) long and 12–42 mm (0.47–1.65 in) wide on a petiole 10–25 mm (0.39–0.98 in) long. The flower buds are arranged in groups of between nine and nineteen or more on a peduncle 3–15 mm (0.12–0.59 in) long, the individual buds on a pedicel 1–5 mm (0.039–0.197 in) long. Mature buds are oval or club-shaped, 3–5 mm (0.12–0.20 in) long and 2–3 mm (0.079–0.118 in) wide with a conical to rounded operculum. Flowering occurs from December to February and the flowers are white. The fruit is a woody, hemispherical to cup-shaped capsule 4–6 mm (0.16–0.24 in) long and wide on a pedicel 1–4 mm (0.039–0.157 in) long.

== Taxonomy and naming ==
Eucalyptus croajingolensis was first formally described in 1990 by Lawrie Johnson and Ken Hill from a specimen collected near Orbost. The description was published in the journal Telopea. The specific epithet (croajingolensis) is a reference to the district and county Croajingolong where this eucalypt is found. The ending -ensis a Latin suffix "denoting place, locality [or] country".

== Distribution and habitat ==
The east Gippsland peppermint grows in forest, often on alluvial soils and occurs from near Eden in New South Wales south to Bairnsdale in Victoria, mostly east of south of the Great Dividing Range.
