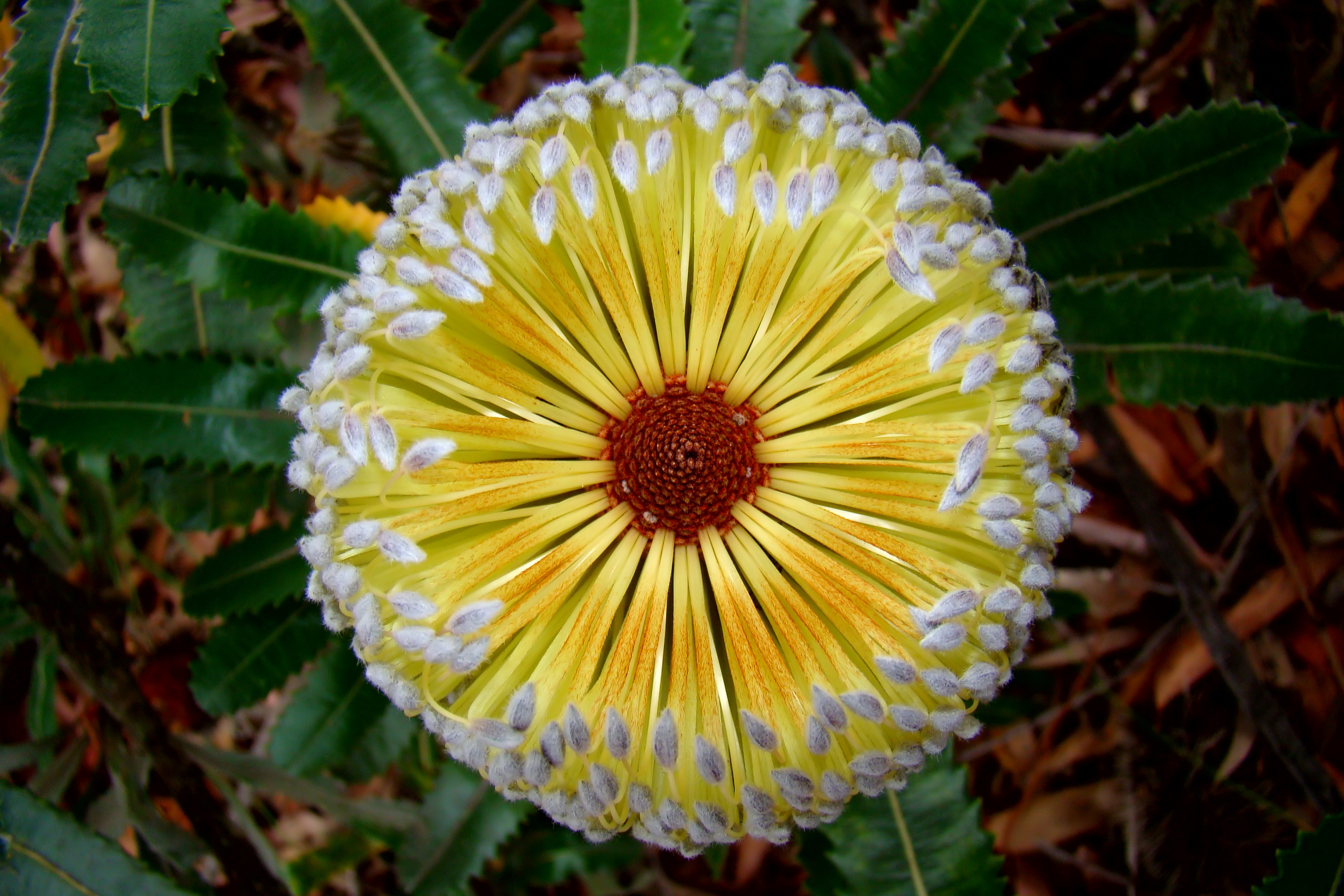
- Banksia serrata

Scientific classification
- Kingdom: Plantae
- Clade: Tracheophytes
- Clade: Angiosperms
- Clade: Eudicots
- Order: Proteales
- Family: Proteaceae
- Subfamily: Grevilleoideae
- Tribe: Banksieae
- Genus: Banksia; L.f.

Type species
- Banksia serrata

Diversity
- About 170 species
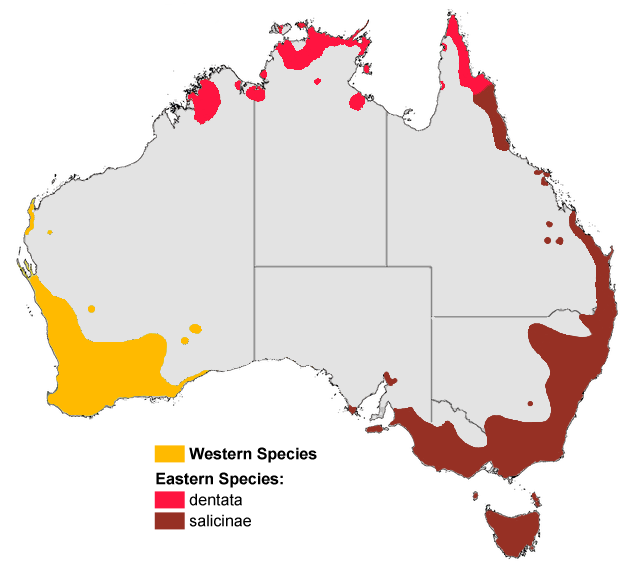
- Distribution of Banksia within Australia

Synonyms
- Dryandra R.Br.; Hemiclidia R.Br.; Isostylis (R.Br.) Spach; Josephia Salisb. ex Knight; Sirmuellera Kuntze

= Banksia =

Banksia Temporal range: Paleogene–Recent

Genus of flowering plants native to Australia

Banksia is a genus of around 170 species of flowering plants in the family Proteaceae. These Australian wildflowers and popular garden plants are easily recognised by their characteristic flower spikes, and woody fruiting "cones" and heads. Banksias range in size from prostrate woody shrubs to trees up to 30 metres (100 ft) tall. They are found in a wide variety of landscapes: sclerophyll forest, (occasionally) rainforest, shrubland, and some more arid landscapes, though not in Australia's deserts.

Heavy producers of nectar, banksias are a vital part of the food chain in the Australian bush. They are an important food source for nectarivorous animals, including birds, bats, rats, possums, stingless bees and a host of invertebrates. Further, they are of economic importance to Australia's nursery and cut flower industries. However, these plants are threatened by a number of processes including land clearing, frequent burning and disease, and a number of species are rare and endangered.

== Description ==
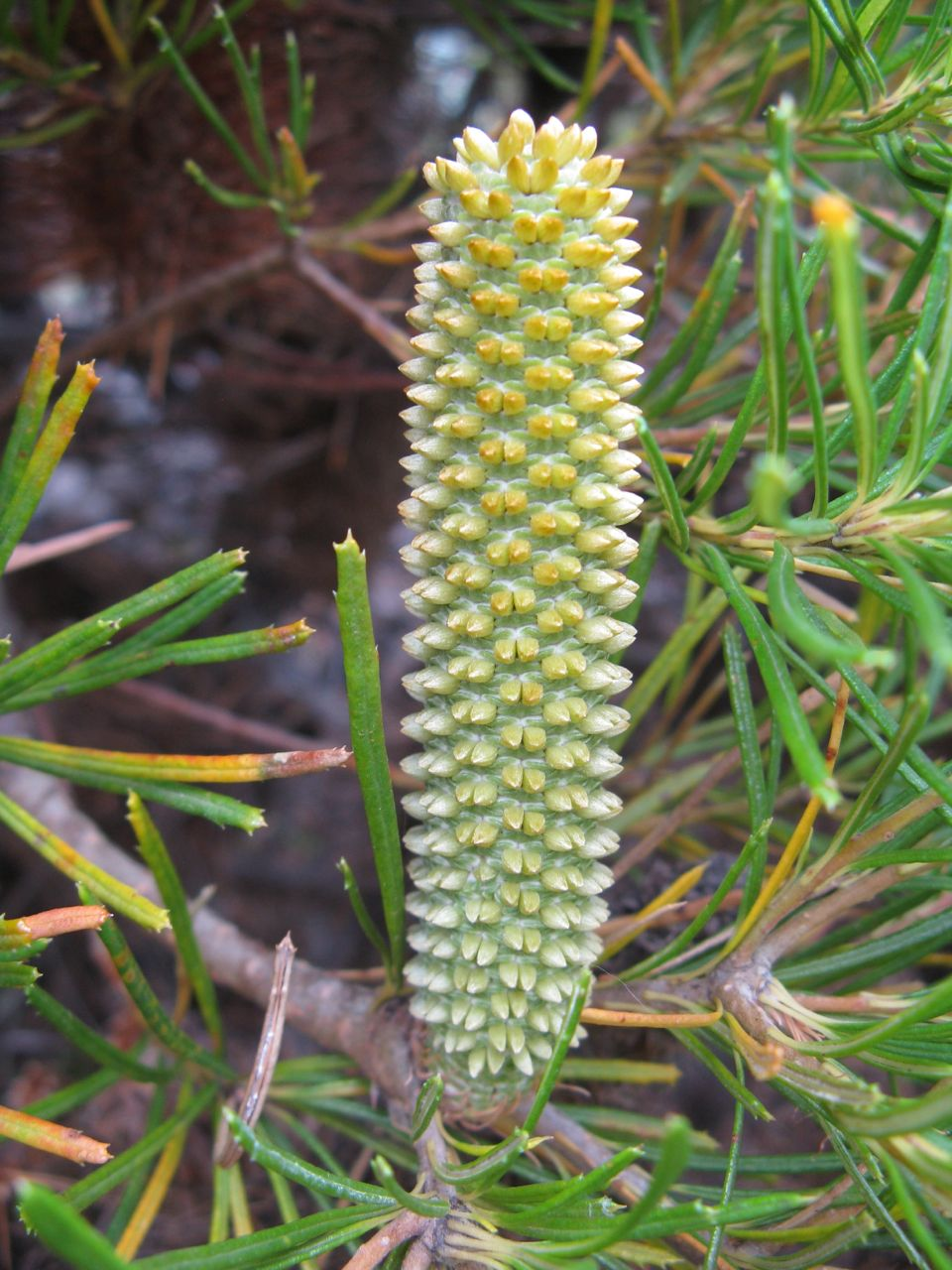
Young Banksia inflorescence showing flower buds developing in pairs

Banksias grow as trees or woody shrubs. Trees of the largest species, B. integrifolia (coast banksia) and B. seminuda (river banksia), often grow over 15 metres tall, some even grow to standing 30 metres tall. Banksia species that grow as shrubs are usually erect, but there are several species that are prostrate, with branches that grow on or below the soil.

The leaves of Banksia vary greatly between species. Sizes vary from the narrow, 1–1 1/2 centimetre long needle-like leaves of B. ericifolia (heath-leaved banksia), to the very large leaves of B. grandis (bull banksia), which may be up to 45 centimetres long. The leaves of most species have serrated edges, but a few, such as B. integrifolia, do not. Leaves are usually arranged along the branches in irregular spirals, but in some species they are crowded together in whorls. Many species have differing juvenile and adult leaves (e.g., Banksia integrifolia has large serrated juvenile leaves).

The flowers are arranged in flower spikes or capitate flower heads. The character most commonly associated with Banksia is the flower spike, an elongated inflorescence consisting of a woody axis covered in tightly packed pairs of flowers attached at right angles. A single flower spike generally contains hundreds or even thousands of flowers; the most recorded is around 6000 on inflorescences of B. grandis. Not all Banksia have an elongate flower spike, however: the members of the small Isostylis complex have long been recognised as banksias in which the flower spike has been reduced to a head; and recently the large genus Dryandra has been found to have arisen from within the ranks of Banksia, and sunk into it as B. ser. Dryandra. They similarly have capitate flower heads rather than spikes.

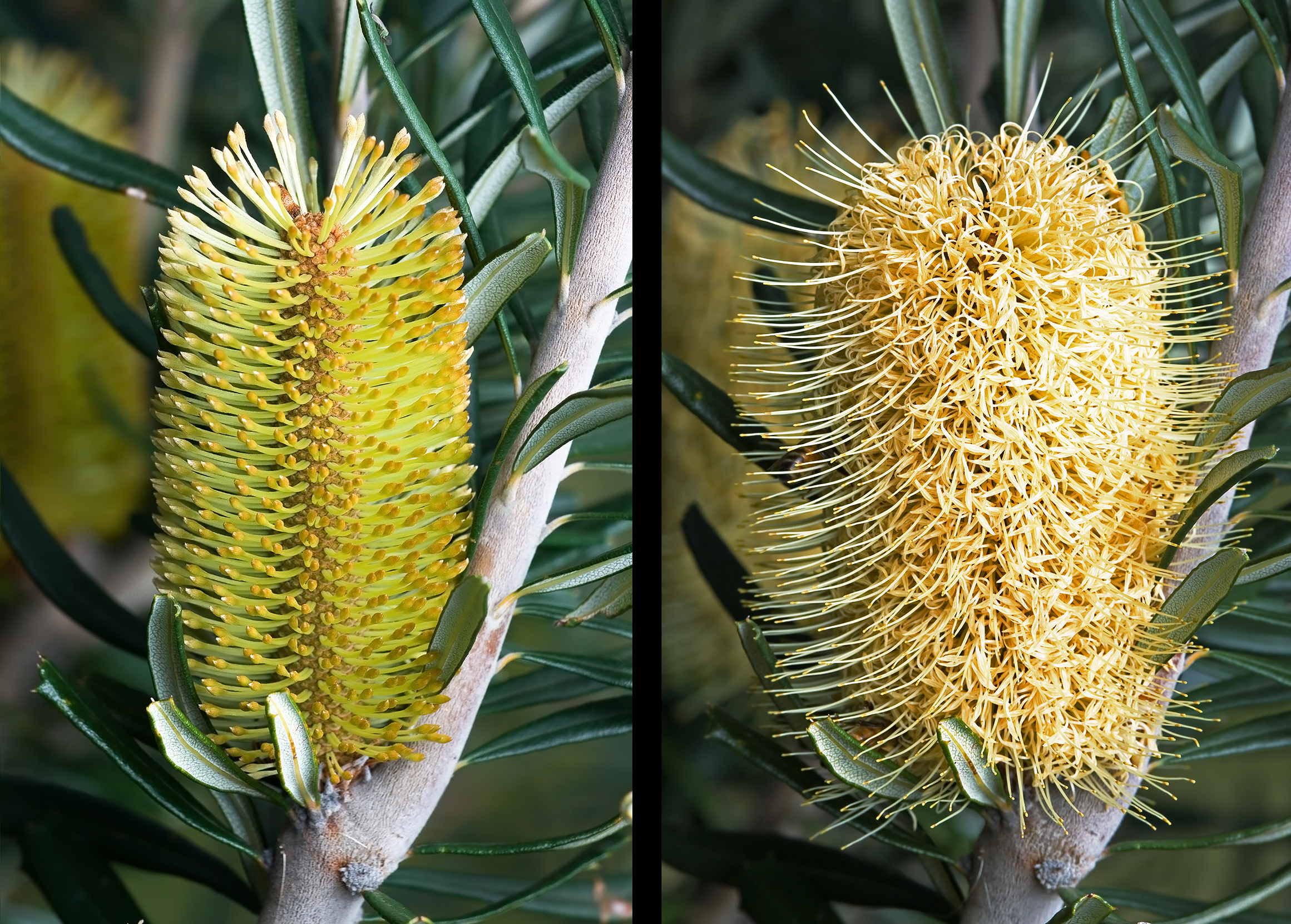
B. marginata flower spike before and after anthesis

Banksia flowers are usually a shade of yellow, but orange, red, pink and even violet flowers also occur. The colour of the flowers is determined by the colour of the perianth parts and often the style. The style is much longer than the perianth, and is initially trapped by the upper perianth parts. These are gradually released over a period of days, either from top to bottom or from bottom to top. When the styles and perianth parts are different colours, the visual effect is of a colour change sweeping along the spike. This can be most spectacular in B. prionotes (acorn banksia) and related species, as the white inflorescence in bud becomes a brilliant orange. In most cases, the individual flowers are tall, thin saccate (sack-shaped) in shape.

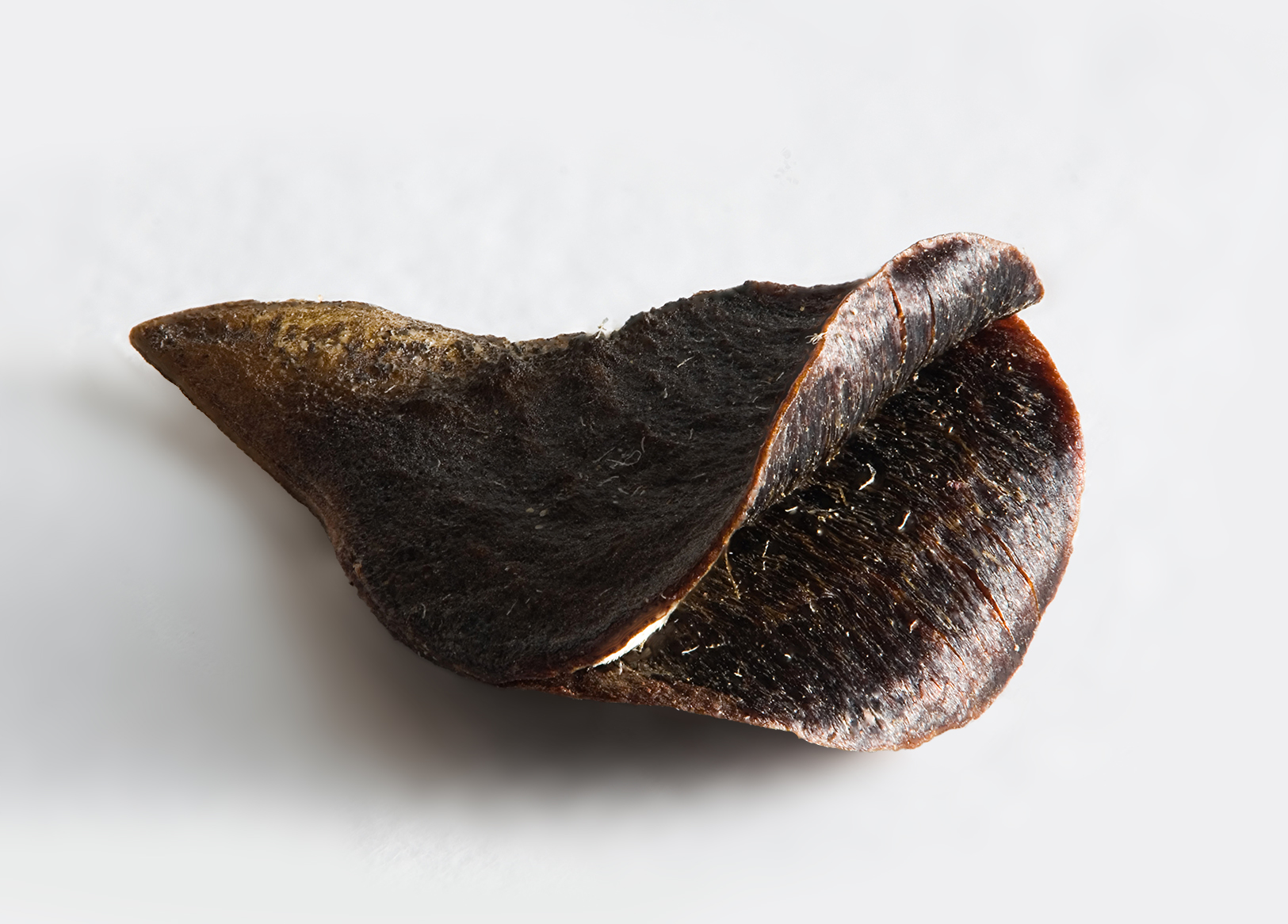
Seed separator of a silver banksia (Banksia marginata) with winged seeds still cohering

Occasionally, multiple flower spikes can form. This is most often seen in Banksia marginata and B. ericifolia (pictured right).

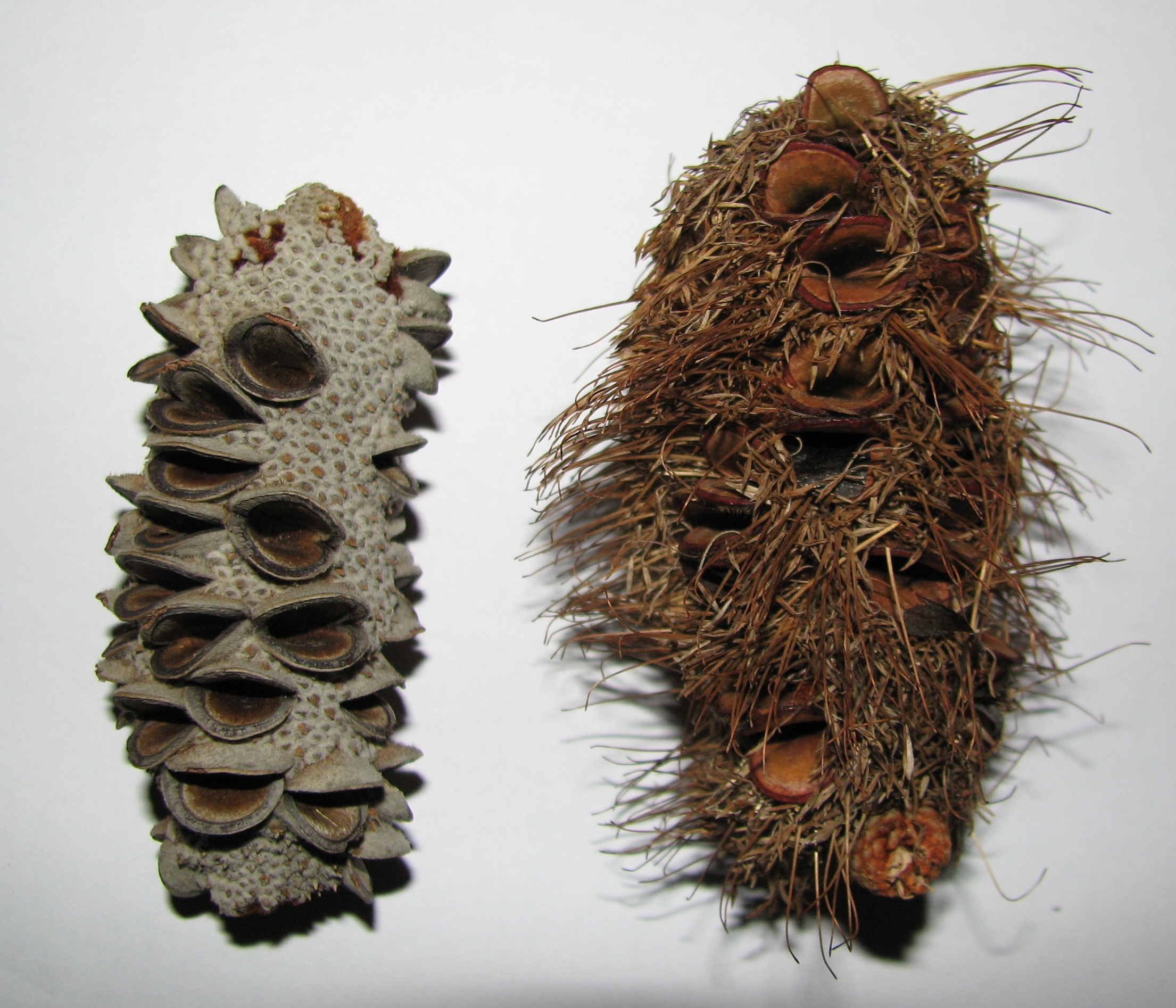
Infructescence of B. integrifolia, with non-persistent flowers; and B. marginata, with persistent flowers

As the flower spikes or heads age, the flower parts dry up and may turn shades of orange, tan or dark brown colour, before fading to grey over a period of years. In some species, old flower parts are lost, revealing the axis; in others, the old flower parts may persist for many years, giving the fruiting structure a hairy appearance. Old flower spikes are commonly referred to as "cones", although they are not technically cones according to the botanical definition of the term: cones only occur in conifers and cycads.

Despite the large number of flowers per inflorescence, only a few of them ever develop fruit, and in some species a flower spike will set no fruit at all. The fruit of Banksia is a woody follicle embedded in the axis of the inflorescence. In many species, the resulting structure is a massive woody structure commonly called a cone. Each follicle consists of two horizontal valves that tightly enclose the seeds. The follicle opens to release the seed by splitting along the suture. In some species, each valve splits too. In some species the follicles open as soon as the seed is mature, but in most species most follicles open only after stimulated to do so by bushfire. Each follicle usually contains one or two small seeds, each with a wedge-shaped papery wing that causes it to spin as it falls to the ground.

== Taxonomy ==
Specimens of Banksia were first collected by Sir Joseph Banks and Daniel Solander, naturalists on the Endeavour during Lieutenant (later Captain) James Cook's first voyage to the Pacific Ocean. Cook landed on Australian soil for the first time on 29 April 1770, at a place that he later named Botany Bay in recognition of "the great quantity of plants Mr Banks and Dr Solander found in this place". Over the next seven weeks, Banks and Solander collected thousands of plant specimens, including the first specimens of a new genus that would later be named Banksia in Banks' honour. Four species were present in this first collection: B. serrata (saw banksia), B. integrifolia (coast banksia), B. ericifolia (heath-leaved banksia) and B. robur (swamp banksia). In June the ship was careened at Endeavour River, where specimens of B. dentata (tropical banksia) were collected.

The genus Banksia was finally described and named by Carolus Linnaeus the Younger in his April 1782 publication Supplementum Plantarum; hence the full name for the genus is "Banksia L.f.". Linnaeus placed the genus in class Tetrandra, order Monogynia of his father's classification, and named it in honour of Banks. The name Banksia had in fact already been published in 1775 as Banksia J.R.Forst & G.Forst, referring to some New Zealand species that the Forsters had collected during Cook's second voyage. However Linnaeus incorrectly attributed the Forsters' specimens to the genus Passerina, and therefore considered the name Banksia available for use. By the time Joseph Gaertner corrected Banks' error in 1788, Banksia L.f. was widely known and accepted, so Gaertner renamed Banksia J.R.Forst, & G.Forst to Pimelea, a name previously chosen for the genus by Banks and Solander.

The first specimens of a Dryandra were collected by Archibald Menzies, surgeon and naturalist to the Vancouver Expedition. At the request of Joseph Banks, Menzies collected natural history specimens wherever possible during the voyage. During September and October 1791, while the expedition were anchored at King George Sound, he collected numerous plant specimens, including the first specimens of Dryandra (now Banksia) sessilis (Parrotbush) and D. (now Banksia) pellaeifolia. Upon Menzies' return to England, he turned his specimens over to Banks; as with most other specimens in Banks' library, they remained undescribed for many years. Robert Brown gave a lecture, naming the new genus Dryandra in 1809, however Joseph Knight published the name Josephia before Brown published his paper with the description of Dryandra. Brown ignored Knight's name, as did subsequent botanists.

In 1891, Otto Kuntze, strictly applying the principle of priority, argued that Pimelea should revert to the name Banksia J.R.Forst & G.Forst. He proposed the new genus Sirmuellera to replaced Banksia L.f. and transferred its species to the new genus. This arrangement was largely ignored by Kuntze's contemporaries.Banksia L.f. was formally conserved and Sirmuellera rejected in 1940.

Banksia belongs to the family Proteaceae, subfamily Grevilleoideae, and tribe Banksieae. There are around 170 species. The closest relatives of Banksia are two genera of rainforest trees in North Queensland (Musgravea and Austromuellera).

=== Subgeneric arrangement ===
Alex George arranged the genus into two subgenera—subgenus Isostylis (containing B. ilicifolia, B. oligantha and B. cuneata) and subgenus Banksia (containing all other species except those he considered dryandras)—in his 1981 monograph and 1999 treatment for the Flora of Australia series. He held that flower morphology was the key to relationships in the genus. Austin Mast and Kevin Thiele published the official merging of Dryandra within Banksia in 2007, recalibrating the genus into subgenus Banksia and subgenus Spathulatae.

== Distribution and habitat ==
All but one of the living Banksia species are endemic to Australia. The exception is B. dentata (tropical banksia), which occurs throughout northern Australia, and on islands to the north including New Guinea and the Aru Islands. An extinct species, B. novae-zelandiae, was found in New Zealand. The other species occur in two distinct geographical regions: southwest Western Australia and eastern Australia. Southwest Western Australia is the main centre of biodiversity; over 90% of all Banksia species occur only there, from Exmouth in the north, south and east to beyond Esperance on the south coast. Eastern Australia has far fewer species, but these include some of best known and most widely distributed species, including B. integrifolia (coast banksia) and B. spinulosa (hairpin banksia). Here they occur from the Eyre Peninsula in South Australia right around the east coast up to Cape York in Queensland.

The vast majority of Banksia are found in sandy or gravelly soils, though some populations of B. marginata (silver banksia) and B. spinulosa do occur on soil that is heavier and more clay-like. B. seminuda is exceptional for its preference for rich loams along watercourses.

Most occur in heathlands or low woodlands; of the eastern species, B. integrifolia and B. marginata occur in forests; many south-western species such as B. grandis, B. sphaerocarpa, B. sessilis, B. nobilis and B. dallanneyi grow as understorey plants in jarrah (Eucalyptus marginata), wandoo (E. wandoo) and karri (E. diversicolor) forests, with B. seminuda being one of the forest trees in suitable habitat.

Most species do not grow well near the coast, notable exceptions being the southern Western Australian species B. speciosa, B. praemorsa and B. repens. Only a few species, such as B. rosserae and B. elderiana (swordfish banksia), occur in arid areas. Most of the eastern Australian species survive in uplands, but only a few of the Western Australian species native to the Stirling Ranges – B. solandri, B. oreophila, B. brownii and B. montana – survive at high elevations.

Studies of the south-western species have found the distribution of Banksia species to be primarily constrained by rainfall. With the exception of B. rosserae, no species tolerates annual rainfall of less than 200 millimetres, despite many species surviving in areas that receive less than 400 millimetres. Banksia species are present throughout the region of suitable rainfall, with greatest speciation in cooler, wetter areas. Hotter, drier regions around the edges of its range tend to have fewer species with larger distributions. The greatest species richness occurs in association with uplands, especially the Stirling Range.

== Evolutionary history and fossil record ==
There are many fossils of Banksia. The oldest of these are fossil pollen between 65 and 59 million years old. There are fossil leaves between 59 and 56 million years old found in southern New South Wales. The oldest fossil cones are between 47.8 and 41.2 million years old, found in Western Australia. Although Banksia is now only native to Australia and New Guinea, there are fossils from New Zealand, between 21 and 25 million years old.

Evolutionary scientists Marcell Cardillo and Renae Pratt have proposed a southwest Australian origin for banksias despite their closest relatives being north Queensland rainforest species.

== Ecology ==
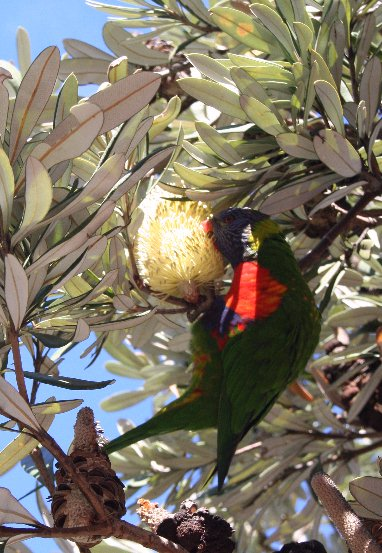
Rainbow lorikeet (Trichoglossus haematodus) feasting on B. integrifolia subsp. integrifolia, Waverley NSW

Banksias are heavy producers of nectar, making them an important source of food for nectivorous animals, including honeyeaters and small mammals such as rodents, antechinus, honey possums, pygmy possums, gliders and bats. Many of these animals play a role in pollination of Banksia. Various studies have shown mammals and birds to be important pollinators. In 1978, Carpenter observed that some banksias had a stronger odour at night, possibly to attract nocturnal mammal pollinators. Other associated fauna include the larvae of moths (such as the Dryandra Moth) and weevils, which burrow into the "cones" to eat the seeds and pupate in the follicles; and birds such as cockatoos, who break off the "cones" to eat both the seeds and the insect larvae.

A number of Banksia species are considered rare or endangered. These include B. brownii (feather-leaved banksia), B. cuneata (matchstick banksia), B. goodii (Good's banksia), B. oligantha (Wagin banksia), B. tricuspis (pine banksia), and B. verticillata (granite banksia).

=== Response to fire ===
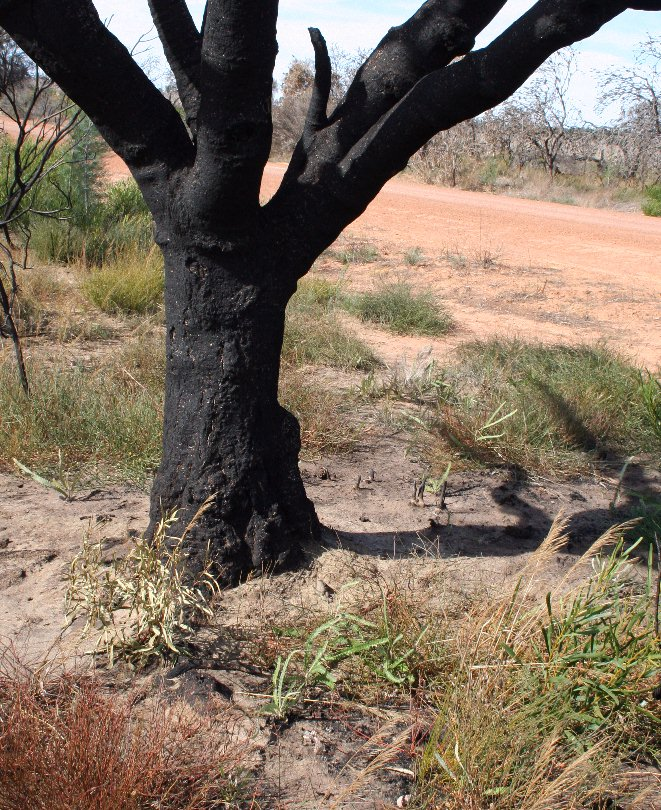
Banksia prionotes seedlings after fire, Burma Road Nature Reserve, Western Australia

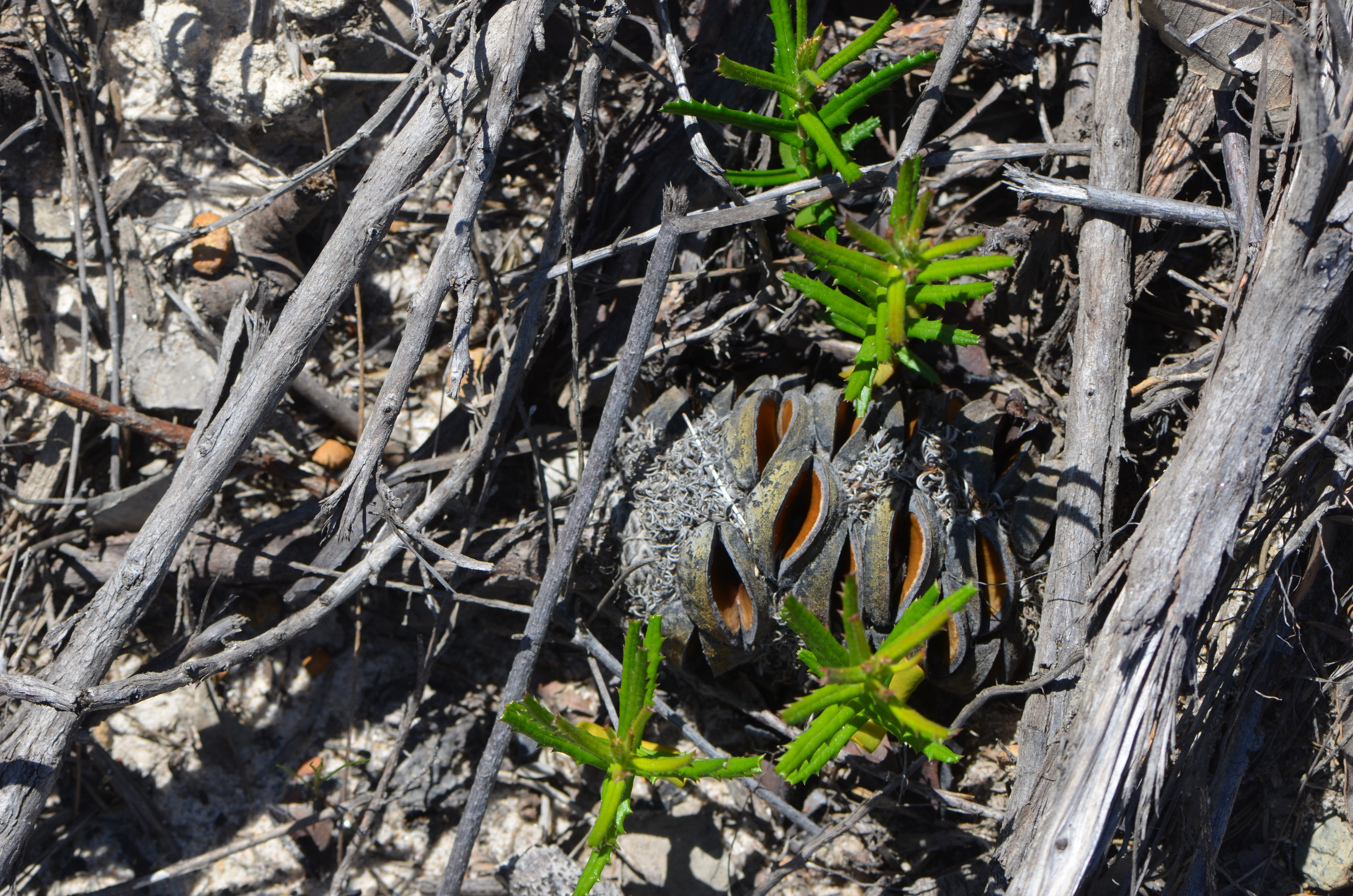
Banksia serrata seedlings and cone after fire, Beacon Hill, New South Wales

Banksia plants are naturally adapted to the presence of regular bushfires in the Australian landscape. About half of Banksia species are killed by bushfire, but these regenerate quickly from seed, as fire also stimulates the opening of seed-bearing follicles and the germination of seed in the ground. The remaining species usually survive bushfire, either by resprouting from a woody base known as a lignotuber or, more rarely, epicormic buds protected by thick bark. In Western Australia, banksias of the first group are known as 'seeders' and the second group as 'sprouters'.

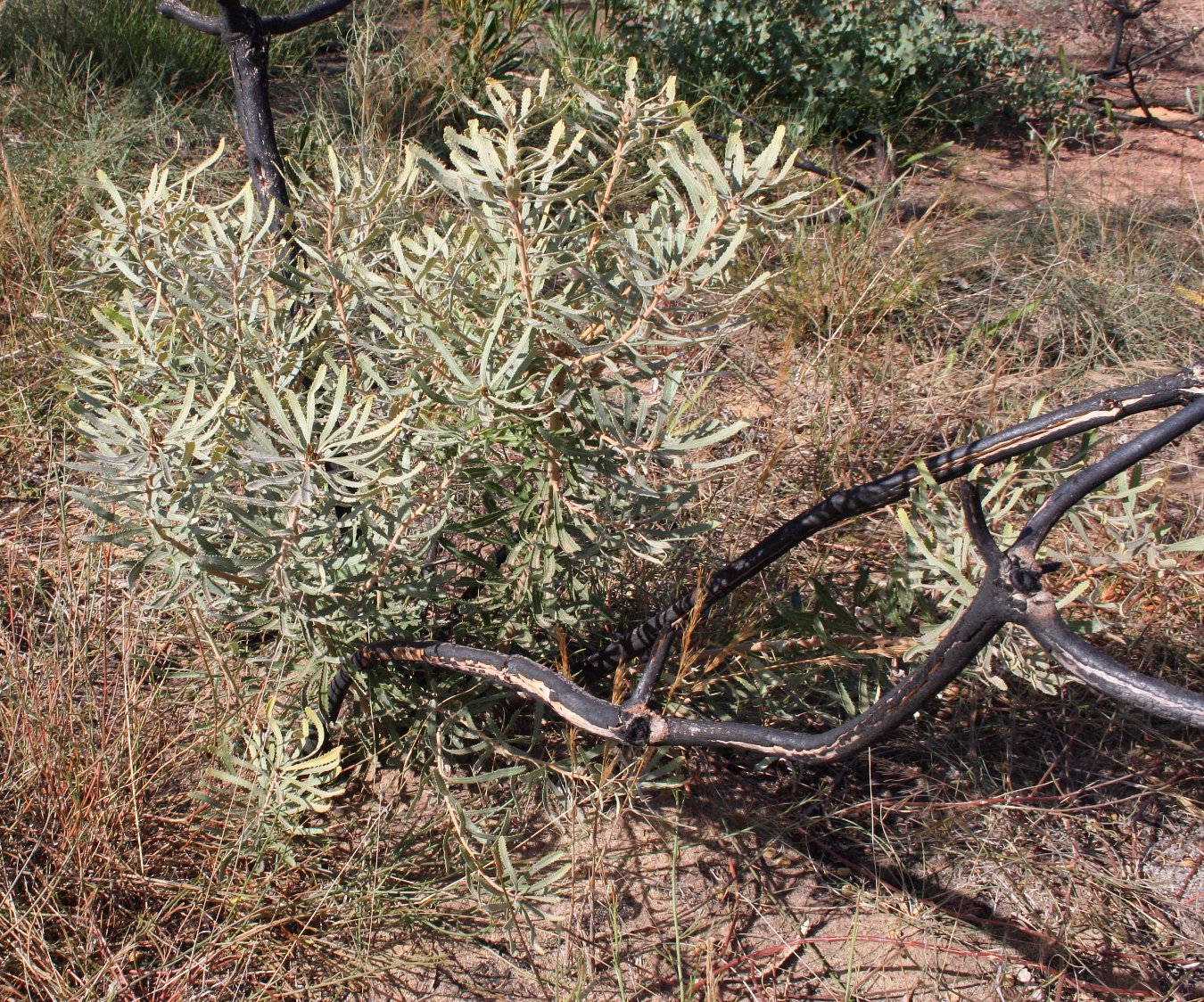
Banksia attenuata resprouting after fire, Burma Road Nature Reserve, Western Australia

Infrequent bushfires at expected intervals pose no threat, and are in fact beneficial for regeneration of banksia populations. However, too frequent bushfires can seriously reduce or even eliminate populations from certain areas, by killing seedlings and young plants before they reach fruiting age. Many fires near urban areas are caused by arson, and thus the frequency is often much higher than fires would have been prior to human habitation. Furthermore, residents who live in areas near bushland may pressure local councils to burn areas near homes more frequently, to reduce fuel-load in the bush and thus reduce ferocity of future fires. Unfortunately there are often discrepancies in agreed frequency between these groups and conservation groups.

=== Dieback ===
Another threat to Banksia is the water mould Phytophthora cinnamomi, commonly known as "dieback". Dieback attacks the roots of plants, destroying the structure of the root tissues, "rotting" the root, and preventing the plant from absorbing water and nutrients. Banksia's proteoid roots, which help it to survive in low-nutrient soils, make it highly susceptible to this disease. All Western Australian species are vulnerable, although most eastern species are fairly resistant.

Vulnerable plants typically die within a few years of infection. In southwest Western Australia, where dieback infestation is widespread, infested areas of Banksia forest typically have less than 30% of the cover of uninfested areas. Plant deaths in such large proportions can have a profound influence on the makeup of plant communities. For example, in southwestern Australia Banksia often occurs as an understorey to forests of jarrah (Eucalyptus marginata), another species highly vulnerable to dieback. Infestation kills both the jarrah overstorey and the original Banksia understorey, and over time these may be replaced by a more open woodland consisting of an overstorey of the resistant marri (Corymbia calophylla), and an understorey of the somewhat resistant Banksia sessilis (parrot bush).

A number of species of Banksia are threatened by dieback. Nearly every known wild population of B. brownii shows some signs of dieback infection, which could possibly wipe it out within years. Other vulnerable species include B. cuneata, and B. verticillata.

Dieback is notoriously difficult to treat, although there has been some success with phosphite and phosphorous acid, which are currently used to inoculate wild B. brownii populations. However this is not without potential problems as it alters the soil composition by adding phosphorus. Some evidence suggests that phosphorous acid may inhibit proteoid root formation.

Because dieback thrives in moist soil conditions, it can be a severe problem for banksias that are watered, such as in the cut flower industry and urban gardens.

== Uses ==
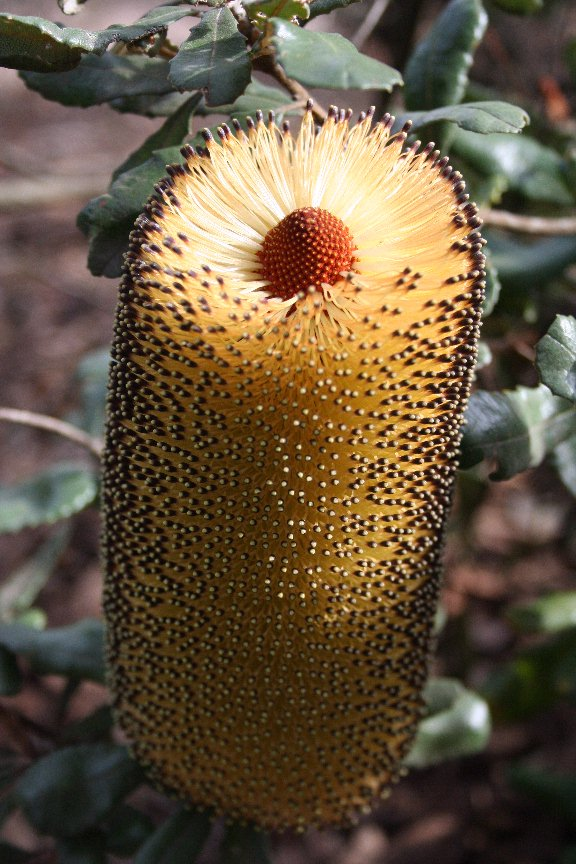
A dwarf form of B. media (southern plains banksia), a popular garden plant, cultivated Maranoa Gardens, Victoria

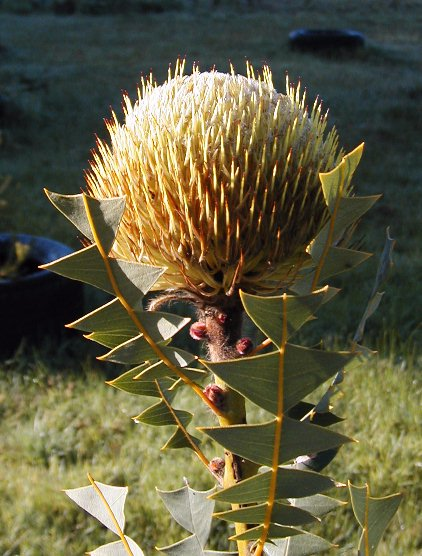
B. baxteri (Birds Nest Banksia), a species used in the cut flower trade, cultivated near Colac, Victoria

=== Gardening ===
Most of the species are shrubs. Only a few of them can be found as trees and they are very popular because of their size. The tallest species are: B. integrifolia having its subspecies B. integrifolia subsp. monticola notable for reaching the biggest size for the genus and it is the most frost tolerant in this genus, B. seminuda, B. littoralis, B. serrata; species that can grow as small trees or big shrubs: B. grandis, B. prionotes, B. marginata, B. coccinea, B. speciosa and B. menziesii. Due to their size these species are popularly planted in parks, gardens and streets, the remaining species in this genus are only shrubs.

Banksias are popular garden plants in Australia because of their large, showy flower heads, and because the large amounts of nectar they produce attracts birds and small mammals. Popular garden species include B. spinulosa, B. ericifolia, B. aemula (wallum banksia), B. serrata (saw banksia), Banksia media (southern plains banksia) and the cultivar Banksia 'Giant Candles'. Banksia species are primarily propagated by seed in the home garden as cuttings can be difficult to strike. However, commercial nurserymen extensively utilize the latter method (indeed, cultivars by nature must be vegetatively propagated by cuttings or grafting).

Over time, dwarf cultivars and prostrate species are becoming more popular as urban gardens grow ever smaller. These include miniature forms under 50 cm high of B. spinulosa and B. media, as well as prostrate species such as B. petiolaris and B. blechnifolia.

Banksias possibly require more maintenance than other Australian natives, though are fairly hardy if the right conditions are provided (sunny aspect and well drained sandy soil). They may need extra water during dry spells until established, which can take up to two years. If fertilised, only slow-release, low-phosphorus fertilizer should be used, as the proteoid roots may be damaged by high nutrient levels in the soil. All respond well to some form of pruning.

Within the Australian horticultural community there is an active subculture of Banksia enthusiasts who seek out interesting flower variants, breed and propagate cultivars, exchange materials and undertake research into cultivation problems and challenges. The main forum for exchange of information within this group is ASGAP's Banksia Study Group.

=== Cut flower industry ===
With the exception of the nursery industry, Banksia have limited commercial use. Some species, principally B. coccinea (scarlet banksia), B. baxteri, B. hookeriana (Hooker's banksia), B. sceptrum (sceptre banksia), and B. prionotes (acorn banksia), and less commonly B. speciosa (showy banksia), B. menziesii (Menzies' banksia), B. burdettii and B. ashbyi are grown on farms in Western and Southern Australia, as well as Israel and Hawaii, and the flower heads harvested for the cut flower trade. Eastern species, such as B. ericifolia, B. robur and B. plagiocarpa, are sometimes cultivated for this purpose. The nectar is also sought by beekeepers, not for the quality of the dark-coloured honey, which is often poor, but because the trees provide an abundant and reliable source of nectar at times when other sources provide little.

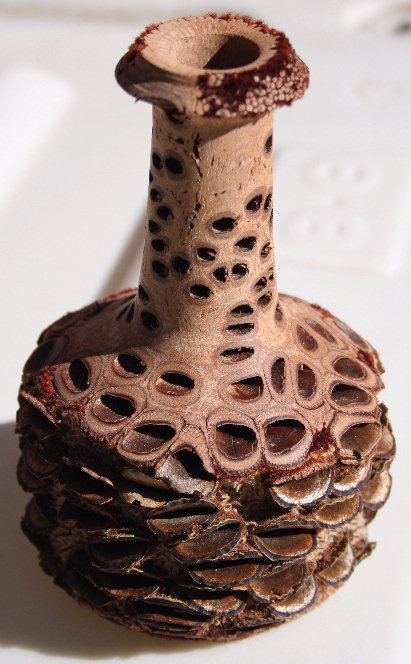
Woodworked Banksia grandis cone

=== Woodworking ===
Banksia wood is reddish in color with an attractive grain but it is rarely used as it warps badly on drying. It is occasionally used for ornamental purposes in wood turning and cabinet paneling. It has also been used to make keels for small boats. Historically, the wood of certain species such as B. serrata was used for yokes and boat parts. The large "cones" or seed pods of B. grandis are used for woodturning projects. They are also sliced up and sold as drink coasters; these are generally marketed as souvenirs for international tourists. Woodturners throughout the world value Banksia pods for making ornamental objects.

=== Indigenous uses ===
The Indigenous people of south-western Australia would suck on the flower spikes to obtain the nectar, they also soaked the flower spikes in water to make a sweet drink. The Noongar people of southwest Western Australia also used infusions of the flower spikes to relieve coughs and sore throats. The Girai wurrung peoples of the western district of Victoria used the spent flower cones to strain water by placing the cones in their mouths and using them like a straw. Banksia trees are a reliable source of insect larvae which are extracted as food.

== Cultural references ==
=== Field guides and other technical resources ===
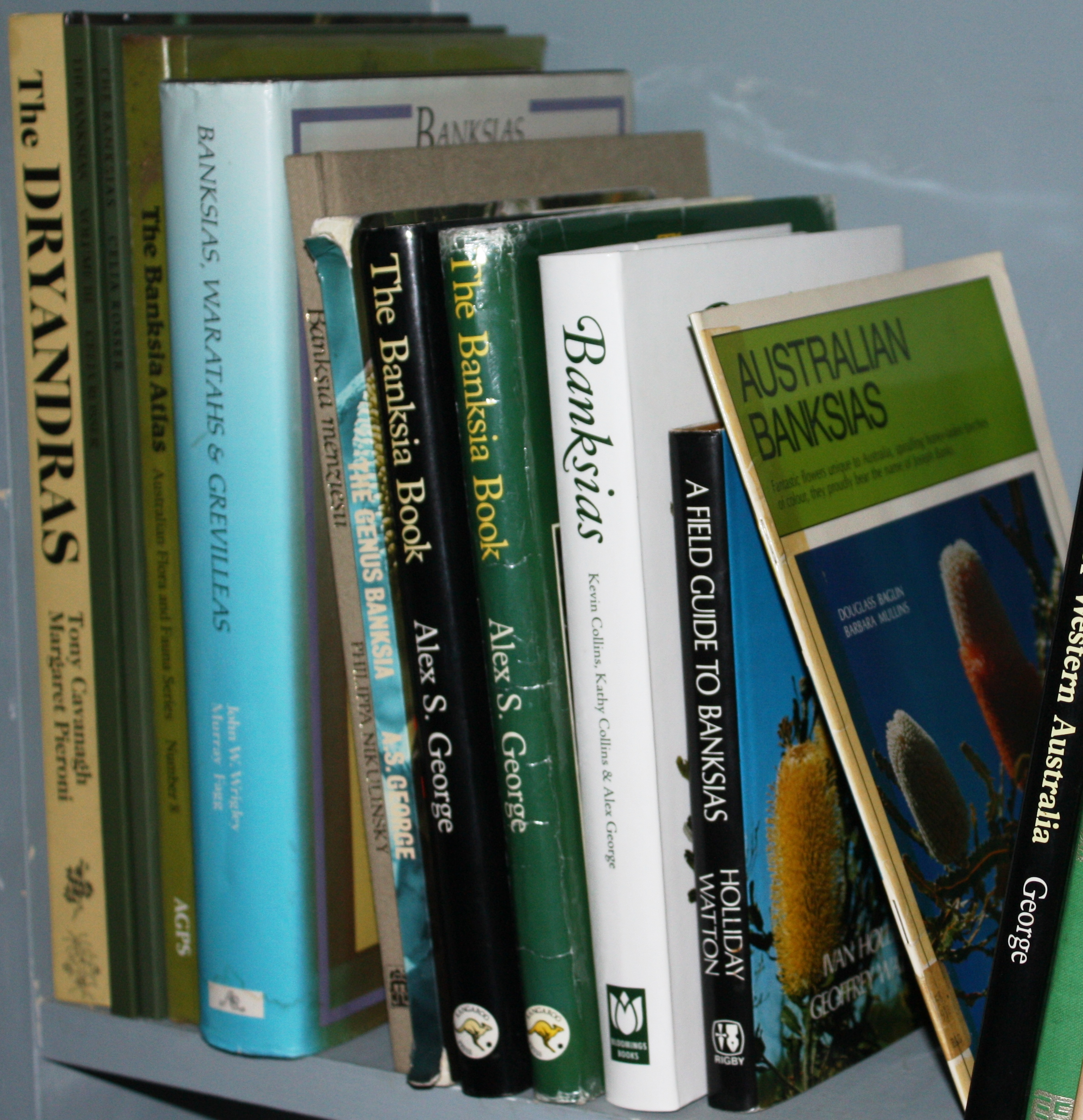
Some of the better known books on the genus

A number of field guides and other semi-technical books on the genus have been published. These include:

Field Guide to Banksias
Written by Ivan Holliday and Geoffrey Watton and first published in 1975, this book contained descriptions and colour photographs of species known at the time. It was largely outdated by the publication of Alex George's classic 1981 monograph, but a revised and updated second edition was released in 1990.

The Banksias
This three volume monograph contains watercolour paintings of every Banksia species by renowned botanical illustrator Celia Rosser, with accompanying text by Alex George. Its publication represents the first time that such a large genus has been entirely painted. Published by Academic Press in association with Monash University, the three volumes were published in 1981, 1988 and 2000 respectively.

The Banksia Book
Begun by Australian photographer Fred Humphreys and Charles Gardner, both of whom died before its completion, The Banksia Book was eventually completed by Alex George and first published in 1984. It included every species known at the time, with a second edition appearing in 1987 and third in 1996.

The Banksia Atlas
In 1983 the Australian Biological Resources Study (ABRS) decided to pilot an Australia-wide distribution study of a significant plant genus. Banksia was chosen because it was a high-profile, widely distributed genus that was easily identified, but for which distribution and habitat was poorly known. The study mobilised over 400 volunteers, collecting over 25,000 field observations over a two-year period. Outcomes included the discovery of two new species, as well as new varieties and some rare colour variants, and discoveries of previously unknown populations of rare and threatened species. The collated data was used to create The Banksia Atlas, which was first published in 1988.

Banksias, Waratahs and Grevilleas and all other plants in the Australian Proteaceae family
Written by J. W. Wrigley and M. Fagg, this was published by Collins Publishers in 1989. A comprehensive text on all the Proteaceae genera with good historical notes and an overview of the 1975 Johnson & Briggs classification. It is out of print and hard to find.

=== May Gibb's "Banksia men" ===
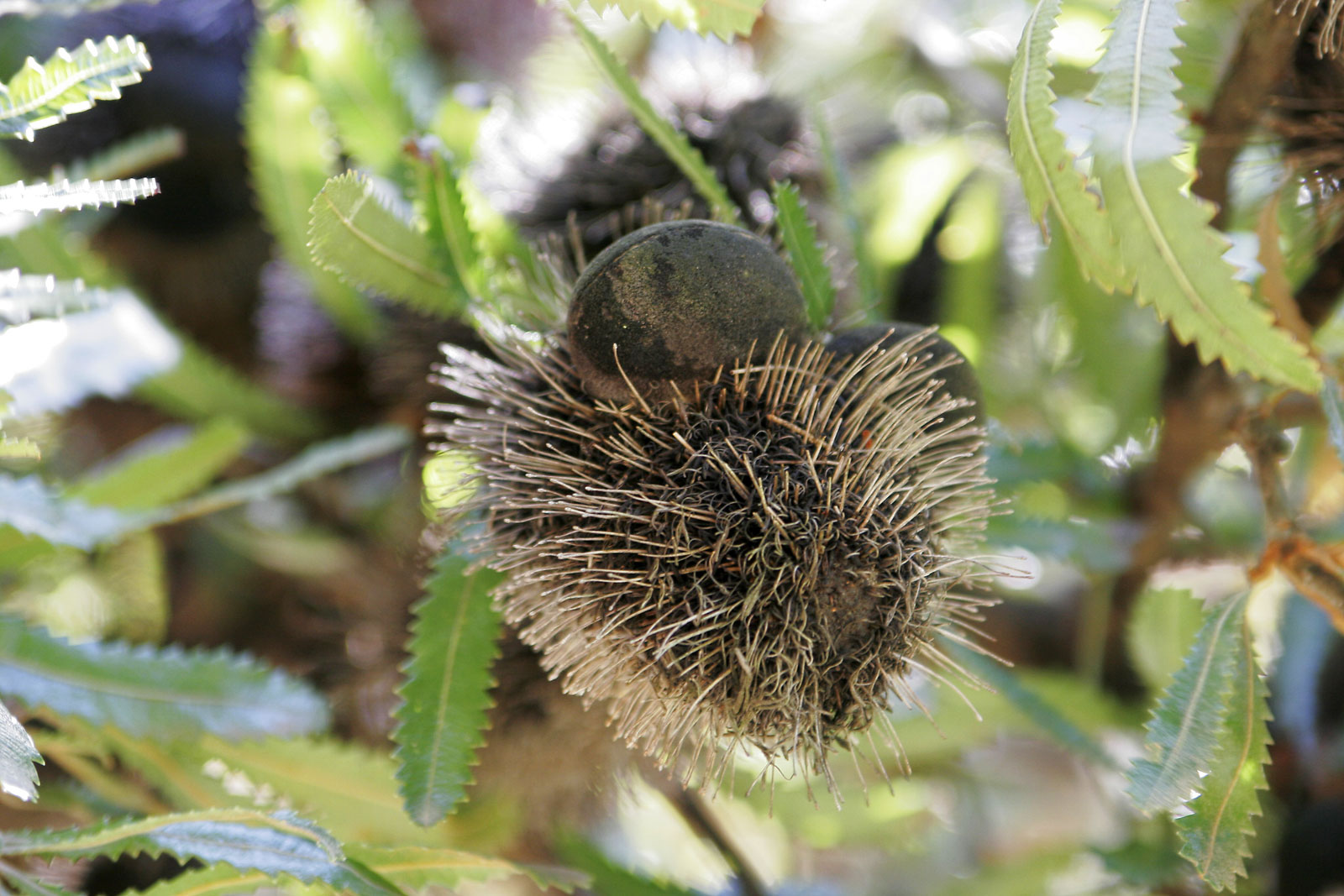
B. aemula seed pod, ANBG, Canberra, a possible inspiration for Gibbs

A Banksia man, from May Gibbs' Snugglepot and Cuddlepie

Perhaps the best known cultural reference to Banksia is the "big bad Banksia men" of May Gibbs' children's book Snugglepot and Cuddlepie. Gibb's "Banksia men" are modelled on the appearance of aged Banksia "cones", with follicles for eyes and other facial features. There is some contention over which species actually provided the inspiration for the "Banksia men": the drawings most resemble the old cones of B. aemula or B. serrata, but B. attenuata (slender banksia) has also been cited, as this was the species that Gibbs saw as a child in Western Australia.

=== Other cultural references ===
In 1989, the Banksia Environmental Foundation was created to support and recognise people and organizations that make a positive contribution to the environment. The Foundation launched the annual Banksia Environmental Awards in the same year.

Announced in June 2023, the exoplanet WASP-19b was named "Banksia" in the third NameExoWorlds competition. The approved name was proposed by a team from Brandon Park Primary School in Wheelers Hill (Melbourne, Australia), led by scientist Lance C. Kelly and teacher David Maierhofer, after various types of Banksia plants.

== Selected species ==
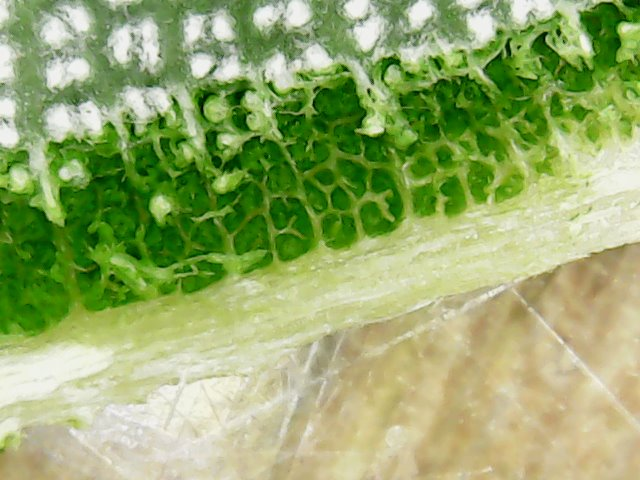
leaf cell structure of a B. ashbyi

- B. archaeocarpa†
- B. attenuata
- B. integrifolia
- B. seminuda
- B. ericifolia
- B. grandis
- B. marginata
- B. prionotes
- B. dentata
- B. novae-zelandiae†
- B. spinulosa
- B. sphaerocarpa
- B. sessilis
- B. nobilis
- B. dallanneyi
- B. praemorsa
- B. repens
- B. rosserae
- B. elderiana
- B. solandri
- B. oreophila
- B. brownii
- B. montana
- B. goodii (Good's Banksia)
- B. tricuspis (Pine Banksia)
- B. verticillata (Granite Banksia)
- Isostylis
  - B. cuneata (Matchstick Banksia)
  - B. ilicifolia (Holly-leaved Banksia)
  - B. oligantha (Wagin banksia)

== See also ==
- Banksiamyces
