= List of centenarians (artists, painters and sculptors) =

The following is a list of centenarians – specifically, people who became famous as artists, painters and sculptors – known for reasons other than their longevity. For more lists, see lists of centenarians.

All supercentenarians (above 110 years old)
Living

Name	Lifespan	Age	Reason for Notability
Rafael Aburto	1913–2014	100	Spanish architect
Florence Akins	1906–2012	106	New Zealand artist
Julian Phelps Allan	1892–1996	103	British sculptor
Jim Allen	1922–2023	100	New Zealand visual artist
Topazia Alliata	1913–2015	102	Italian painter and art curator
Manuel Álvarez Bravo	1902–2002	100	Mexican photographer
Max Angus	1914–2017	102	Australian painter
Marilee Shapiro Asher	1912–2020	107	American sculptor
Duffy Ayers	1915–2017	102	British portrait painter
Unity Bainbridge	1916–2017	101	Canadian artist
Rie de Balbian Verster-Bolderheij	1890–1990	100	Dutch painter and Olympic art competitor
Will Barnet	1911–2012	101	American painter and printmaker
Harland Bartholomew	1889–1989	100	American urban planner
Caroline van Hook Bean	1879–1980	101	American painter
Ruth Bernhard	1905–2006	101	German-American photographer
Theresa Bernstein	1890–2002	111	Polish-born American painter
Sherab Palden Beru	1911–2012	100/101	Tibetan thangka artist
Vittore Bocchetta	1918–2021	102	Italian sculptor, painter and academic
Gottfried Böhm	1920–2021	101	German architect and sculptor
Mary Borgstrom	1916–2019	102	Canadian potter and ceramist
Eva Børresen	1920–2022	101	German-born Norwegian ceramist
Sorcha Boru	1900–2006	105	American potter
Frank Leonard Brooks	1911–2011	100	Canadian artist
Umberto Bruni	1914–2021	106	Canadian painter and sculptor
Duane Bryers	1911–2012	100	American painter, illustrator and sculptor
John Chessell Buckler	1793–1894	100	British architect
Rose Cabat	1914–2015	100	American ceramicist
Frederick Carder	1863–1963	100	British-born American glassmaker and artist
Marie-Louise Carven	1909–2015	105	French fashion designer
Malvina Cheek	1915–2016	100	British artist
Saloua Raouda Choucair	1916–2017	100	Lebanese painter and sculptor
Carmen Cicero	1926–	100	American painter
Huguette Clark	1906–2011	104	American heiress, artist, and art collector
Edna Clarke Hall	1879–1979	100	British artist and poet
Alphaeus Philemon Cole	1876–1988	112	American painter
Horacio Coppola	1906–2012	105	Argentine photographer and filmmaker
Robert Couturier	1905–2008	103	French sculptor
Trevor Dannatt	1920–2021	101	British architect
Sylvia Daoust	1902–2004	102	Canadian sculptor
Marianne de Trey	1913–2016	102	British studio potter
Edgar Dell	1901–2008	106	Australian painter
Medi Dinu	1909–2016	107	Romanian painter
Nell Donnelly Reed	1889–1991	102	American fashion designer and businesswoman
Gillo Dorfles	1910–2018	107	Italian art critic, painter and philosopher
Hans Erni	1909–2015	106	Swiss painter and sculptor
Arturo Estrada Hernández	1925–	101	Mexican painter
Anthony Eyton	1923–	103	British painter
Moisey Feigin	1904–2008	103	Russian artist
Sylvia Fein	1919–2024	104	American painter and author
T. Lux Feininger	1910–2011	101	American painter and photographer
Micol Fontana	1913–2015	101	Italian stylist and entrepreneur
Hannah Frank	1908–2008	100	Scottish sculptor
Katherine Fryer	1910–2017	106	British artist
Reg Gammon	1894–1997	103	British painter and illustrator
Rupprecht Geiger	1908–2009	101	German painter
Léonie Geisendorf	1914–2016	101	Polish-Swedish architect
Temima Gezari	1905–2009	103	Russian-American artist and arts educator
Bruno Giacometti	1907–2012	104	Swiss architect
Françoise Gilot	1921–2023	101	French painter
Karl Otto Götz	1914–2017	103	German artist
Jean Donald Gow	1903–2005	102	Canadian artist
Kathleen Hale	1898–2000	101	British illustrator
Ruth Inge Hardison	1914–2016	102	American sculptor and photographer
Bertha George Harris	1913–2014	101	American potter
Åke Hellman	1915–2017	102	Finnish still life artist
Carmen Herrera	1915–2022	106	Cuban painter
Elvie Hill	1917–2018	100	Australian fashion designer
Hirakushi Denchū	1872–1979	107	Japanese sculptor
Mary Rockwell Hook	1877–1978	101	American architect
Fumiko Hori	1918–2019	100	Japanese Nihonga painter
Clementine Hunter	1886/1887–1988	100/101	American folk artist
Ion Irimescu	1903–2005	102	Romanian sculptor and sketcher
Al Jaffee	1921–2023	102	American cartoonist
Jao Tsung-I	1917–2018	100	Hong Kong-based Chinese sinologist, calligrapher and painter
Russell Johnson	1893–1995	101	American cartoonist
Elsbeth Juda	1911–2014	103	German-born British fashion photographer
Max Kahn	1902–2005	103	Belarusian-American lithographer, sculptor and painter
Tamako Kataoka	1905–2008	103	Japanese Nihonga painter
Krishen Khanna	1925–	101	Indian painter
Inge King	1915–2016	100	Australian sculptor
Jonah Kinigstein	1923–2025	102	American painter
Seibo Kitamura	1884–1987	102	Japanese sculptor and Olympic art competitor
John Koerner	1913–2014	100	Czech-born Canadian artist
George Paul Kornegay	1913–2014	100	American outsider artist and Methodist minister
Motoichi Kumagai	1909–2010	101	Japanese photographer and illustrator
Eyre de Lanux	1894–1996	102	American artist
Judith Lauand	1922–2022	100	Brazilian painter and printmaker
Lawrence Lee	1909–2011	101	British stained glass artist
Ulrich Leman	1885–1988	102	German painter
Sonja de Lennart	1920–	106	German fashion designer
Frances Lennon	1912–2015	102	British artist
Stanley Cornwell Lewis	1905–2009	103	Welsh illustrator and artist
Schomer Lichtner	1905–2006	101	American painter and printmaker
Lim Tze Peng	1921–2025	103	Singaporean painter
Leonard Long	1911–2013	102	Australian landscape painter
Trento Longaretti	1916–2017	100	Italian painter
Loongkoonan	1910–2018	c. 108	Australian indigenous artist
Tamás Lossonczy	1904–2009	105	Hungarian painter
Walter Mafli	1915–2017	102	Swiss painter and draftsman
Leonard Manasseh	1916–2017	100	British architect
Louis Maurer	1832–1932	100	German-born American lithographer and printer
Richard Mayhew	1924–2024	100	American landscape painter, illustrator, and arts educator
Doris McCarthy	1910–2010	100	Canadian painter
Harrison McIntosh	1914–2016	101	American ceramic artist
Donal McLaughlin	1907–2009	102	American architect who helped design the Flag of the United Nations
Käthe Menzel-Jordan	1916–2026	109	German architect
Ursula Mommens	1908–2010	101	British potter
Alan Moore	1914–2015	101	Australian war artist
Grandma Moses	1860–1961	101	American folk artist
Wynona Mulcaster	1915–2016	101	Canadian painter
Oscar Niemeyer	1907–2012	104	Brazilian modernist architect
Johan Nordhagen	1856–1956	100	Norwegian artist
Whang-od	1917–	109	Filipino mambabatok or tattoo artist
Tomie Ohtake	1913–2015	101	Japanese artist
Togyū Okumura	1889–1990	101	Japanese painter of the nihonga style of watercolour painting
Dan Ormsbee	1884–1985	101	American architect
William Pachner	1915–2017	102	Czech painter
Pierre Parsus	1921–2022	100	French painter
I. M. Pei	1917–2019	102	Chinese-American architect
S. D. Phadnis	1925–	101	Indian cartoonist and illustrator
The Honourable Katherine Plunket	1820–1932	111	Irish botanic artist and noblewoman
Maria Posobchuk	1890–1992	102	Ukrainian weaver and folk artist
Don Potter	1902–2004	102	British sculptor and potter
Mirko Rački	1879–1982	102	Croatian painter
Eileen Ramsay	1915–2017	101	British photographer
Eleanor Raymond	1887–1989	102	American architect
Edmund Reitter	1904–2005	100	Austrian sculptor and Olympic art competitor
Lily Renée	1921–2022	101	Austrian-born American comic book artist
Judith Révész	1915–2018	102	Hungarian-Dutch potter and sculptor
Glenora Richards	1909–2009	100	American painter
Christiane Ritter	1897–2000	103	Austrian painter and writer
Marie Lucas Robiquet	1858–1959	101	French artist
Manuel Rodriguez Sr.	1912–2017	105	Filipino printmaker
Andrée Ruellan	1905–2006	101	American painter
Margery Ryerson	1886–1989	102	American artist and painter
Abolhassan Sadighi	1894–1995	101	Iranian sculptor and painter
Ángeles Santos Torroella	1911–2013	101	Catalan painter
Tsuneko Sasamoto	1914–2022	107	Japanese photojournalist
Gertrude Sawyer	1895–1996	100	American architect
Sigrid Schauman	1877–1979	101	Finnish artist and art critic
Marian Cannon Schlesinger	1912–2017	105	American artist and author
Gerda Schmidt-Panknin	1920–2021	100	German painter
Viktor Schreckengost	1906–2008	101	American artist and industrial designer
Bernarda Bryson Shahn	1903–2004	101	American painter, lithographer and widow of artist Ben Shahn
Editta Sherman	1912–2013	101	American photographer
Toko Shinoda	1913–2021	107	Japanese artist
Gordon A. Smith	1919–2020	100	British-born Canadian artist
Koloman Sokol	1902–2003	100	Slovak painter and graphic artist
Pierre Soulages	1919–2022	102	French painter and sculptor
Louis Sparre	1863–1964	101	Swedish painter, designer and Finnish film pioneer
Ethel Stein	1917–2018	100	American textile artist
Olin Stephens	1908–2008	100	American yacht designer
Hedda Sterne	1910–2011	100	Romanian-American painter and printmaker
Franciszek Strynkiewicz	1893–1996	103	Polish sculptor and Olympic art competitor
Françoise Sullivan	1923–	103	Canadian painter, photographer, and choreographer
Ram V. Sutar	1925–2025	100	Indian sculptor
Toshiko Taira	1921–2022	101	Japanese textile artist
Dorothea Tanning	1910–2012	101	American painter, printmaker, sculptor, writer, and poet
Lenore Tawney	1907–2007	100	American fiber artist
Carlo Testi	1902–2005	102	Italian painter
Wayne Thiebaud	1920–2021	101	American painter and printmaker
Luís Torras	1912–2024	111	Spanish painter
A. Hays Town	1903–2005	101	American architect
Jack Turner	1889–1989	100	Canadian photographer
Un'ichi Hiratsuka	1895–1997	102	Japanese wood carver and leader of the Sōsaku hanga movement
Josefina de Vasconcellos	1904–2005	100	Brazilian-British sculptor
Robert-Rudolf Volk	1921–2021	100	Estonian sculptor
Beta Vukanović	1872–1972	100	Serbian painter
Martha Walter	1875–1976	100	American impressionist painter
Wang Da-hong	1917–2018	100	Chinese-born Taiwanese architect
Wang Panyuan	1908–2017	109	Taiwanese painter
Guy Warren	1921–2024	103	Australian painter
Seema Aissen Weatherwax	1905–2006	100	Ukrainian-American photographer
Richard K. Webel	1900–2000	100	American landscape architect and designer
Martin J. Weber	1905–2007	102	American graphic artist
Clara McDonald Williamson	1875–1976	100	American painter
Tyrus Wong	1910–2016	106	Chinese-American artist
Beatrice Wood	1893–1998	105	American artist and ceramist
Michael Wright	1912–2018	105	Hong Kong architect
Boris Yefimov	1900–2008	108	Russian cartoonist
Bachir Yellès	1921–2022	100	Algerian painter
Ogura Yuki	1895–2000	105	Japanese painter
Israel Zafrir	1911–2016	105	Israeli photographer
Eva Zeisel	1906–2011	105	Hungarian industrial designer
Zhou Lingzhao	1919–2023	103	Chinese painter
Milford Zornes	1908–2008	100	American watercolor artist and teacher
