= Dryandra ser. Floribundae =

Obsolete series of plants

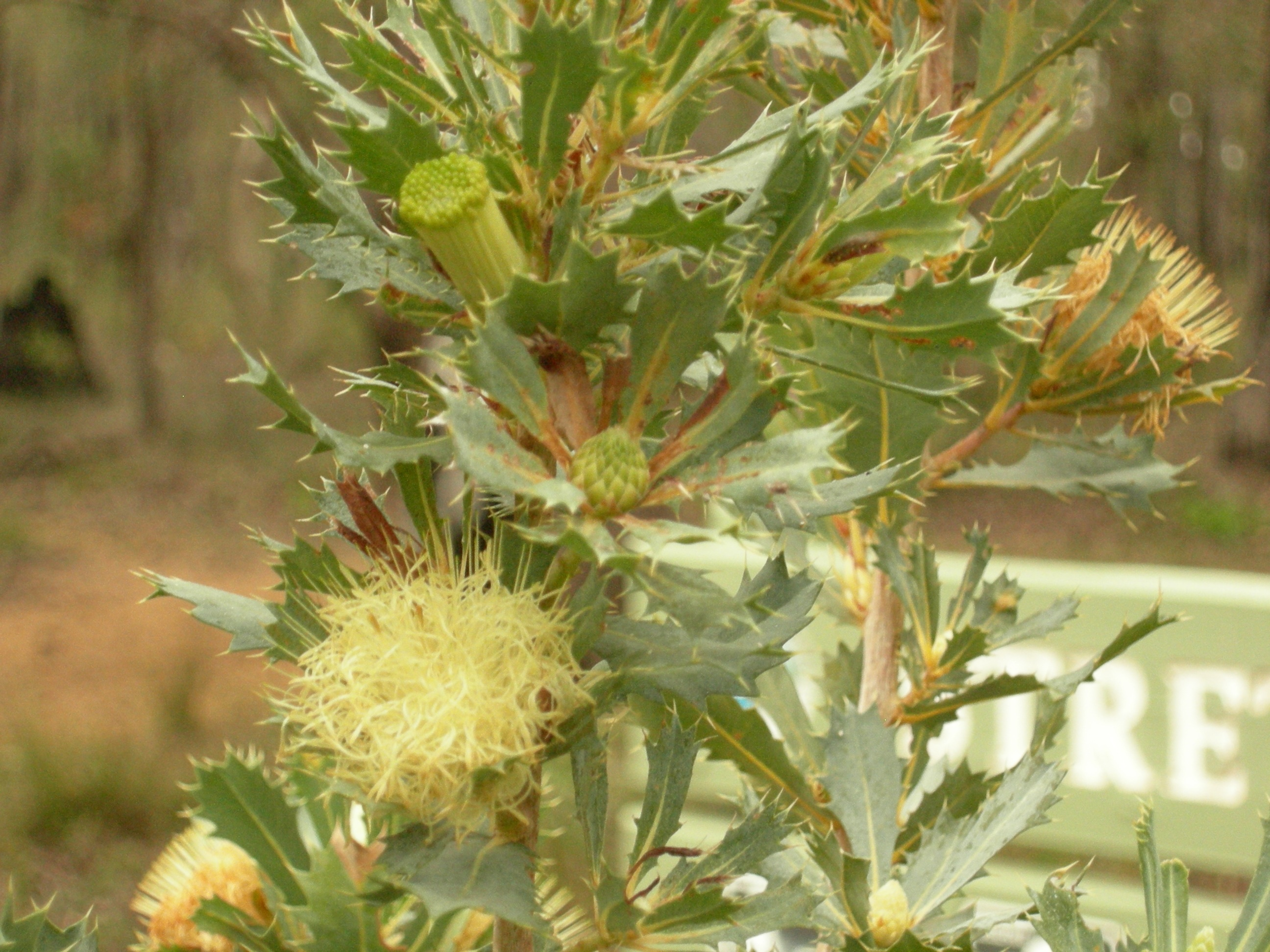
Banksia sessilis (syn. Dryandra sessilis, Dryandra floribunda)

Dryandra ser. Floribundae is an obsolete series within the former genus Dryandra (now Banksia ser. Dryandra). It was first published by George Bentham in 1870, and was given a new circumscription by Alex George in 1996, but was ultimately discarded in 2007 when Austin Mast and Kevin Thiele sunk Dryandra into Banksia.

== According to Bentham ==
Bentham's definition of D. ser. Floribundae encompassed the species with inflorescences that were very much exposed, because their floral leaves were either very short or "few and spreading". The placement and circumscription of the series may be summarised as follows:

Dryandra (now Banksia ser. Dryandra)

D. sect. Eudryandra

D. ser. Armatæ (7 species)
D. ser. Floribundæ

D. floribunda (now B. sessilis var. sessilis)

D. floribunda var. major (now B. sessilis var. cordata)

D. carduacea (now B. squarrosa subsp. squarrosa)
D. carlinoides (now B. carlinoides)
D. polycephala (now B. polycephala)
D. Kippistiana (now B. kippistiana)

D. ser. Concinnæ (4 species)
D. ser. Formosæ (5 species)
D. ser. Niveae (4 species, 2 varieties)
D. ser. Obvallatæ (12 species)
D. ser. Gymnocephalæ (3 species)

D. sect. Aphragma (7 species, 2 varieties)

== According to George ==
Bentham's arrangement stood until 1996, when Alex George published his revision of Dryandra. George transferred D. carduacea (which was then named D. squarrosa subsp. squarrosa) and D. polycephala into D. ser. Armatae, and placed D. carlinoides and D. kippistiana in D. ser. Acrodontae. This left only D. floribundae (which was then named D. sessilis) in D. ser. Floribundae. The series was defined in terms of the distinguishing characteristics of D. sessilis; for example it was noted that "the apparent absence of floral bracts is unique in the genus."

George's placement and circumscription of D. ser. Floribundae, as amended in 1999 and 2005, may be summarised as follows:

Dryandra (now Banksia ser. Dryandra)

D. sub. Dryandra

D. ser. Floribundae

D. sessilis (now B. sessilis)

D. sessilis var. sessilis (now B. sessilis var. sessilis)
D. sessilis var. flabellifolia (now B. sessilis var. flabellifolia)
D. sessilis var. cordata (now B. sessilis var. cordata)
D. sessilis var. cygnorum (now B. sessilis var. cygnorum)

D. ser. Armatae (21 species, 7 subspecies, 4 varieties)
D. ser. Marginatae (1 species)
D. ser. Folliculosae (1 species, 5 varieties)
D. ser. Acrodontae (4 species, 2 varieties)
D. ser. Capitellatae (2 species, 2 subspecies)
D. ser. Ilicinae (3 species, 2 varieties)
D. ser. Dryandra (3 species, 2 subspecies)
D. ser. Foliosae (3 species, 2 subspecies)
D. ser. Decurrentes (1 species)
D. ser. Tenuifoliae (2 species, 2 varieties)
D. ser. Runcinatae (4 species, 7 subspecies)
D. ser. Triangulares (3 species, 3 subspecies)
D. ser. Aphragma (9 species, 3 subspecies)
D. ser. Ionthocarpae (1 species, 2 subspecies)
D. ser. Inusitatae (1 species)
D. ser. Subulatae (1 species)
D. ser. Gymnocephalae (11 species, 4 subspecies, 2 varieties)
D. ser. Concinnae (3 species)
D. ser. Obvallatae (7 species, 2 varieties)
D. ser. Pectinatae (1 species)
D. ser. Acuminatae (1 species)
D. ser. Niveae (7 species, 7 subspecies)

D. subg. Hemiclidia (2 species)
D. subg. Diplophragma (1 species)

== Recent developments ==
Since 1998, Austin Mast has been publishing results of ongoing cladistic analyses of DNA sequence data for the subtribe Banksiinae. His analyses have provided compelling evidence of the paraphyly of Banksia with respect to Dryandra; that is, it seems that Dryandra arose from within the ranks of Banksia. Early in 2007, Mast and Kevin Thiele initiated a rearrangement of Banksia by sinking Dryandra into it as B. ser. Dryandra. This transfer necessitated the setting aside of George's infrageneric arrangement of Dryandra; thus D. ser. Floribundae is no longer current. Mast and Thiele have foreshadowed publishing a full arrangement once DNA sampling of Dryandra is complete.
