= Martin Weber =

Martin Weber may refer to:

- Martin Weber (architect) (1890–1941), German architect
- Martin J. Weber (1905–2007), American graphic artist
- Martin Weber (ski jumper) (born 1954), East German former ski jumper
- Martin Weber (footballer) (born 1957), Swiss former football player and manager
- Heinrich Martin Weber (1842–1913), German mathematician
- Martin Andrade Weber Chagas Carvalho (born 1985), Brazilian former football player
- Martin Weber House, historical residence of Catherin and Martin Weber

== See also ==
- Weber
