= Bonnie Harris =

American painter

- Born: Rebecca Levine; 1870; Chicago, Illinois, United States
- Died: 1962 (aged 91–92); Jacksonville, Florida, United States
- Known for: Painting
- Style: Still life Landscape; Figurative; Collage
- Spouse(s): Frank Harris (1890-?); 5 children

Bonnie Harris (born Rebecca Levine; 1870 – 1962) was an American artist.

== Early life and education ==
Rebecca Levine was born to Harris Levine and Frances Myers in Chicago, Illinois in 1870.

== Mid-life and career ==
She lived in the Hyde Park neighborhood of Chicago for 45 years. She also lived in Minneapolis, Minnesota, Washington, D.C., and Colorado. She had five children, including two artist daughters: Marilee Shapiro Asher and Eleanor Harris, both artists. She began painting when she was 79 years old, inspired by the painting career of her daughter, Eleanor. She was self-taught. Her work was exhibited at the Baltimore Museum of Art, the Corcoran Gallery of Art, Walker Art Center and the Minneapolis Institute of Arts. The Hyde Park Art Center described her style as using "bold colors reflecting a vision of a highly poetic everyday work."

== Later life, death and legacy ==
Harris painted until her death in 1962, at age 91 or 92, in Jacksonville, Florida.

== Notable collections sea scapes ==
- Houses in Winter (Minneapolis), gouache on paper, 1953; Smithsonian American Art Museum

== Notable exhibitions ==
- Solo retrospective, 1995, Hyde Park Art Center
- Group show, 2001, Vassar College
- "Outside In: Self-Taught Artists and Chicago", 2002, Smart Museum of Art
