= Banksia sessilis var. flabellifolia =

Scientific classification
- Kingdom: Plantae
- Clade: Embryophytes
- Clade: Tracheophytes
- Clade: Spermatophytes
- Clade: Angiosperms
- Clade: Eudicots
- Order: Proteales
- Family: Proteaceae
- Genus: Banksia
- Species: B. sessilis
- Variety: B. s. var. flabellifolia

Trinomial name
- Banksia sessilis var. flabellifolia (A.S.George) A.R.Mast & K.R.Thiele

Synonyms
- Dryandra sessilis var. flabellifolia A.S.George

Variety of plant native to Australia

Banksia sessilis var. flabellifolia is a variety of Banksia sessilis (parrot bush).

== Description ==
It grows as a shrub up to five metres high. Unlike other varieties of B. sessilis, it has hairless stems. The leaves are fan shaped, with a long, toothless lower margin, and a toothed end. As such its leaves are quite similar to some of those of B. sessilis var. cygnorum, but are larger, being up to four centimetres long and 3.5 centimetres wide. They also lack lobes at the base. As with other varieties of B. sessilis, the flowers are greenish-yellow. Each head contains around 90 flowers.

== Taxonomy ==
This variety was first published by Alex George in 1996, based on a specimen he collected on 11 August 1993 on West Binnu Road, 4.4 kilometres east of Yeringa South Road, north-north-west of Northampton, Western Australia. The varietal epithet is from the Latin flabellum ("fan") and folium ("leaf"), and refers to the fan-shaped leaves characteristic of this variety. The name given at the time was Dryandra sessilis var. flabellifolia, and this stood until 2007, when Austin Mast and Kevin Thiele transferred Dryandra into Banksia; thus the variety's current full name is Banksia sessilis var. flabellifolia (A.S.George) A.R.Mast & K.R.Thiele.

In 1999, George placed it between B. sessilis var. sessilis and B. sessilis var. cordata in phyletic order.

== Distribution and habitat ==
B. sessilis var. flabellifolia grows in both deep sand and on laterite, between Geraldton and Kalbarri inland to Northampton and south as far as Moora, in the South West Botanical Province of Western Australia

== Cultivation ==
This variety is little known in cultivation. It is suggested that cultivation requirements would be similar to the better-known B. sessilis var. sessilis, but that this variety would be better suited to hotter, drier coastal areas.
