= Carlo Testi =

Italian painter

- Born: 27 November 1902; Ravina, Italy
- Died: 10 November 2005 (aged 102); Bardolino, Italy
- Occupation: Painter

Carlo Testi (27 November 1902 – 10 November 2005) was an Italian painter. His work was part of the painting event in the art competition at the 1932 Summer Olympics.

== See also ==
- List of centenarians (artists, painters and sculptors)
