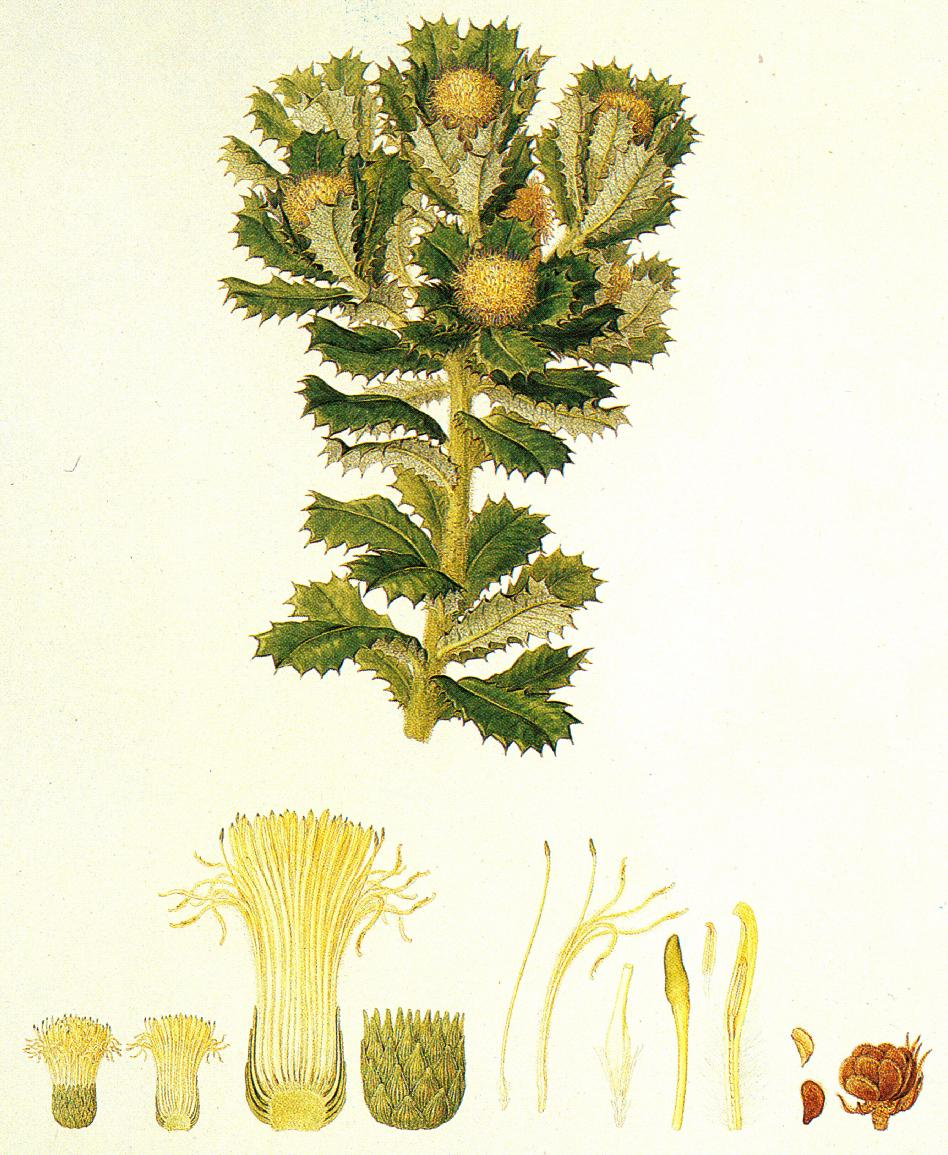
- Painting of B. sessilis var. sessilis by Ferdinand Bauer

Scientific classification
- Kingdom: Plantae
- Clade: Embryophytes
- Clade: Tracheophytes
- Clade: Spermatophytes
- Clade: Angiosperms
- Clade: Eudicots
- Order: Proteales
- Family: Proteaceae
- Genus: Banksia
- Species: B. sessilis (Knight) A.R.Mast & K.R.Thiele
- Variety: B. s. var. sessilis

Trinomial name
- Banksia sessilis var. sessilis

= Banksia sessilis var. sessilis =

Variety of plant from Western Australia

Banksia sessilis var. sessilis is the most populous and most widespread variety of Banksia sessilis (parrot bush).

== Description ==
The leaves of this variety are larger than those of B. sessilis var. cygnorum but smaller than those of B. sessilis var. cordata. It differs from B. sessilis var. flabellifolia in having lobes at the base of many leaves.

== Taxonomy ==
As the autonymous variety, B. sessilis var. sessilis encompasses the type material of the species; thus collections of this variety date back to the 1791 visit of Archibald Menzies to King George Sound. However the autonym was not needed until 1996, when Alex George published the other three varieties. As this taxon was then placed within the genus Dryandra, this varieties name was then Dryandra sessilis var. sessilis. It was transferred to its current name in 2007, when Austin Mast and Kevin Thiele transferred Dryandra into Banksia.

== Distribution and habitat ==
B. sessilis var. sessilis occurs in a wide belt running from Regans Ford and Moora in the north, southeast to Collie and Bremer Bay.

== Cultivation ==
It is a hardy plant that tolerates a wide range of soils and conditions, including drought and moderate frost. It flowers heavily, and produces an abundance of honey. However it is too large for smaller gardens, and in suitable conditions can produce many seedlings.
