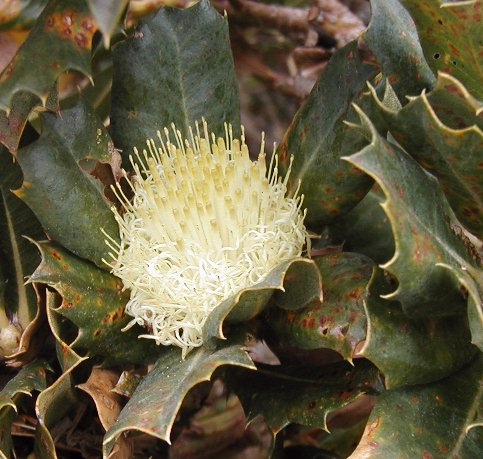
- B. sessilis var. cordata

Scientific classification
- Kingdom: Plantae
- Clade: Embryophytes
- Clade: Tracheophytes
- Clade: Spermatophytes
- Clade: Angiosperms
- Clade: Eudicots
- Order: Proteales
- Family: Proteaceae
- Subfamily: Grevilleoideae
- Tribe: Banksieae
- Genus: Banksia
- Species: B. sessilis

Binomial name
- Banksia sessilis (Knight) A.R.Mast & K.R.Thiele

Varieties
- B. sessilis var. sessilis B. sessilis var. cordata B. sessilis var. cygnorum B. sessilis var. flabellifolia

Synonyms
- Josephia sessilis Knight; Dryandra sessilis (Knight) Domin

= Banksia sessilis =

Species of plant of Western Australia

Banksia sessilis, commonly known as parrot bush, is a species of shrub or tree in the plant genus Banksia of the family Proteaceae. It had been known as Dryandra sessilis until 2007, when the genus Dryandra was sunk into Banksia. The Noongar peoples know the plant as budjan or butyak. Widespread throughout southwest Western Australia, it is found on sandy soils over laterite or limestone, often as an understorey plant in open forest, woodland or shrubland. Encountered as a shrub or small tree up to 6 m (20 ft) in height, it has prickly dark green leaves and dome-shaped cream-yellow flowerheads. Flowering from winter through to late spring, it provides a key source of food—both the nectar and the insects it attracts—for honeyeaters in the cooler months, and species diversity is reduced in areas where there is little or no parrot bush occurring. Several species of honeyeater, some species of native bee, and the European honey bee seek out and consume the nectar, while the long-billed black cockatoo and Australian ringneck eat the seed. The life cycle of Banksia sessilis is adapted to regular bushfires. Killed by fire and regenerating by seed afterwards, each shrub generally produces many flowerheads and a massive amount of seed. It can recolonise disturbed areas, and may grow in thickets.

Banksia sessilis has a somewhat complicated taxonomic history. It was collected from King George Sound in 1801 and described by Robert Brown in 1810 as Dryandra floribunda, a name by which it was known for many years. However, Joseph Knight had published the name Josephia sessilis in 1809, which had precedence due to its earlier date, and the specific name was formalised in 1924. Four varieties are recognised. It is a prickly plant with little apparent horticultural potential; none of the varieties are commonly seen in cultivation. A profuse producer of nectar, B. sessilis is valuable to the beekeeping industry.

== Description ==
Banksia sessilis grows as an upright shrub or small tree up to 6 m (20 ft) high, without a lignotuber. In most varieties, new stems are covered in soft, fine hairs that are lost with maturity; but new stems of B. sessilis var. flabellifolia are usually hairless. Leaves are blue-green or dark green. Their shape differs by variety: in var. cygnorum and var. flabellifolia they are wedge-shaped, with teeth only near the apex; in var. cordata they are wedge-shaped, but with teeth along the entire margin; and in var. sessilis they are somewhat broader at the base, sometimes almost oblong in shape. Leaf size ranges from 2 to 6 cm (1 to 2.5 in) in length, and 0.8–4 cm (0.3–1.6 in) in width. They may be sessile (that is, growing directly from the stem without a petiole) or on a petiole up to 0.5 cm (0.20 in) long.

The inflorescences are cream or yellow, and occur in domed heads 4 to 5 cm (1.6 to 2.0 in) wide, situated at the end of a stem. Each head contains from 55 to 125 individual flowers, surrounded at the base by a whorl of short involucral bracts. As with most other Proteaceae, individual flowers consist of a tubular perianth made up of four united tepals, and one long wiry style. The style end is initially trapped inside the upper perianth parts, but breaks free at anthesis. In B. sessilis the perianth is straight, 20 to 32 mm (0.8 to 1.3 in) long, and pale yellow. The style is slightly shorter, also straight, and cream-coloured. Thus in B. sessilis, unlike many other Banksia species, the release of the style at anthesis does not result in a showy flower colour change. One field study found that anthesis took place over four days, with the outer flowers opening first and moving inwards.

Flowering mostly takes place from July to November; var. sessilis can start as early as May. After flowering, the flower parts wither and fall away, and up to four follicles develop in the receptacle (the base of the flower head). Young follicles are covered in a fine fur, but this is lost as they mature. Mature follicles are ovoid in shape, and measure 1–1.5 cm (0.4–0.6 in) in length. Most follicles open as soon as they are ripe, revealing their contents: a woody seed separator and up to two winged seeds.

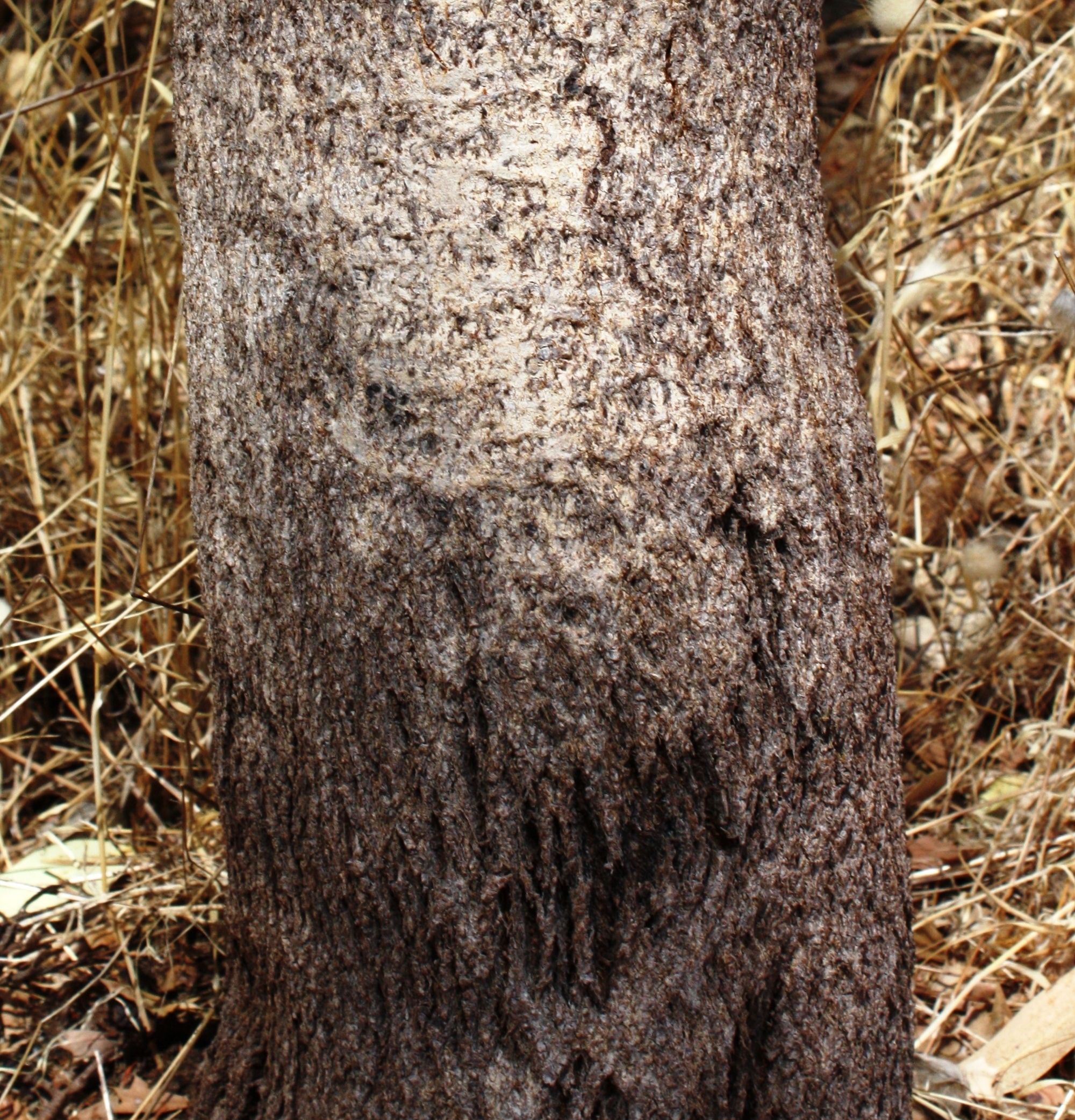
Trunk and bark of an unusually large old tree

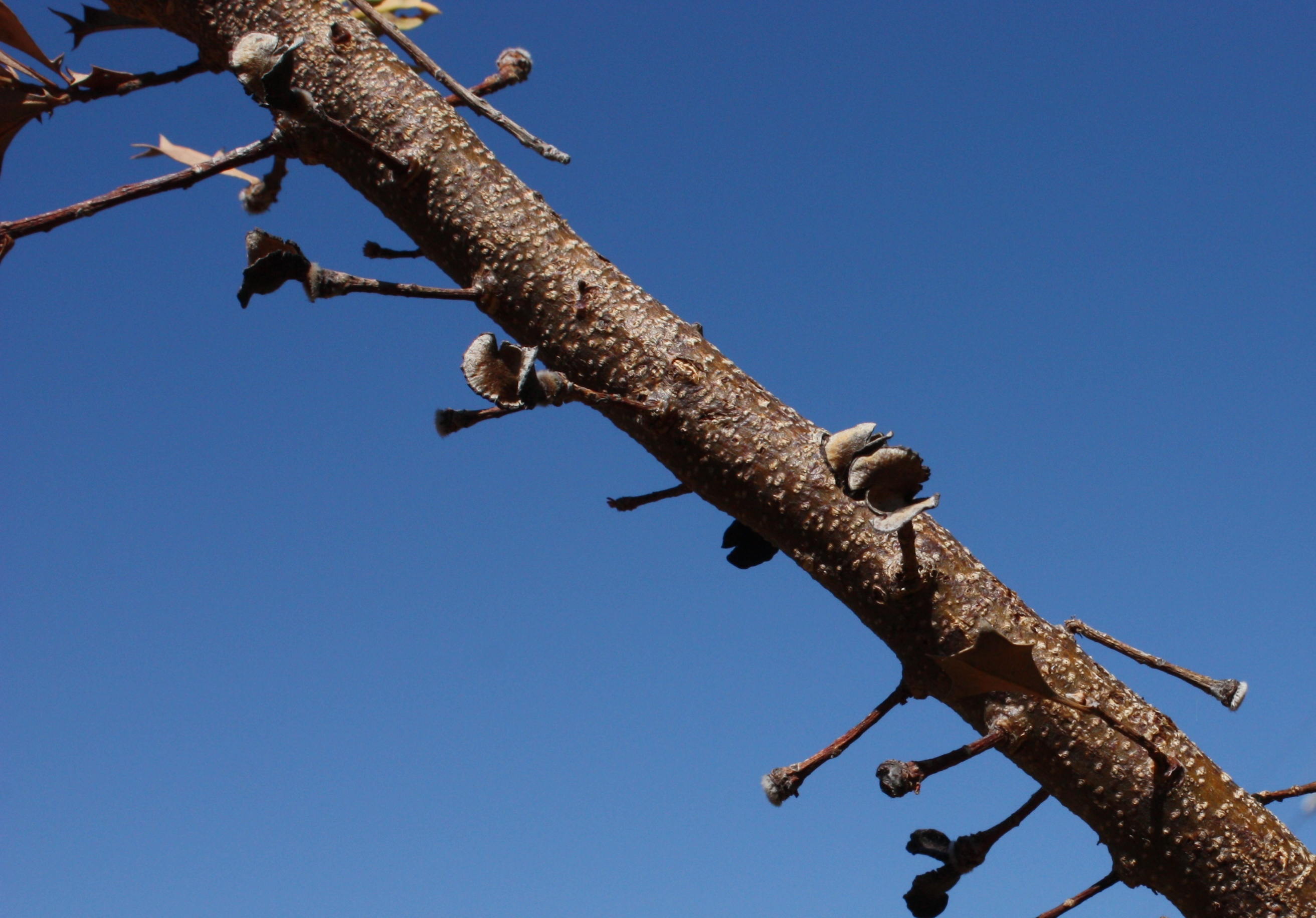
A branch after shedding of foliage and fruit

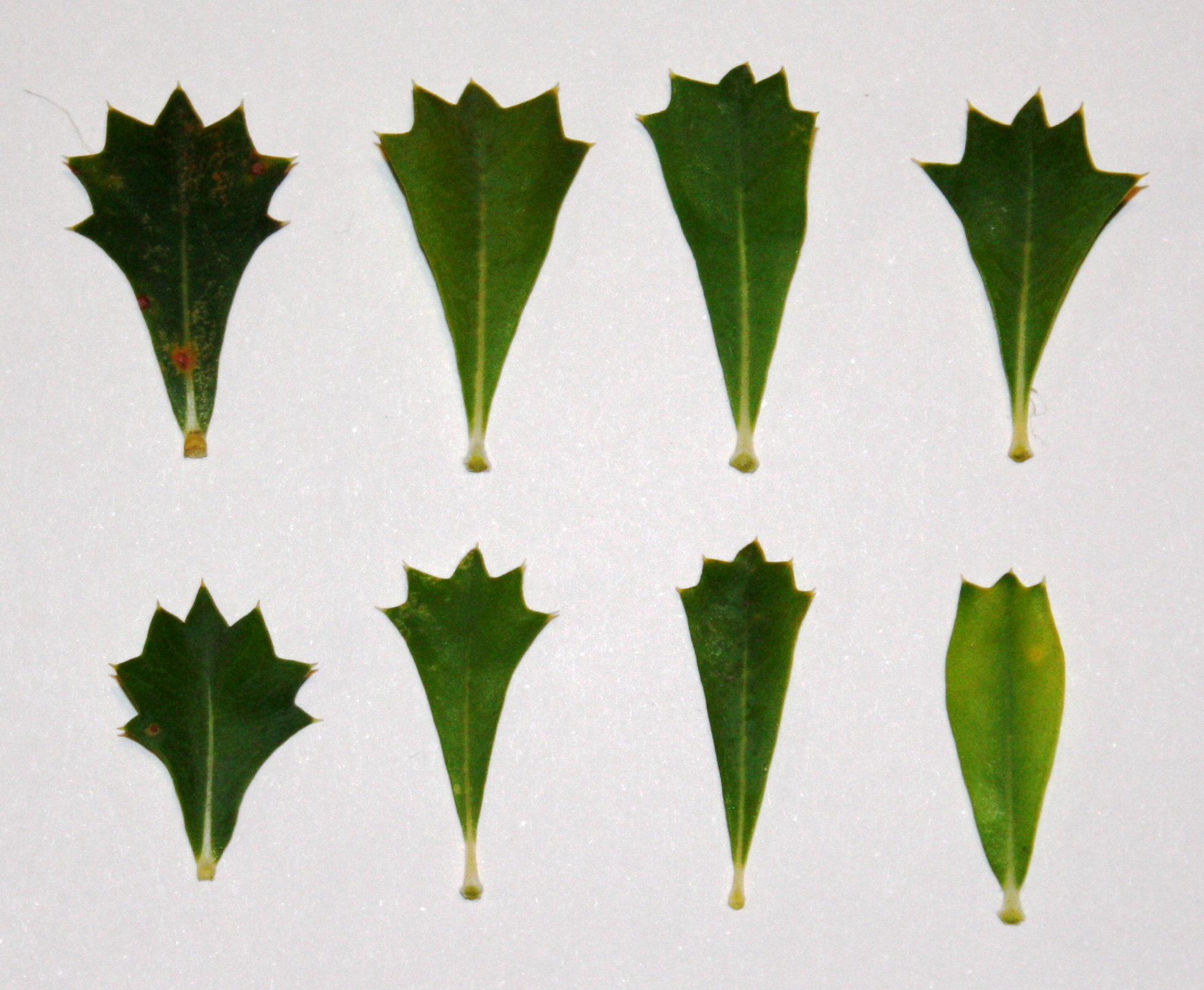
Leaf variation in var. cygnorum

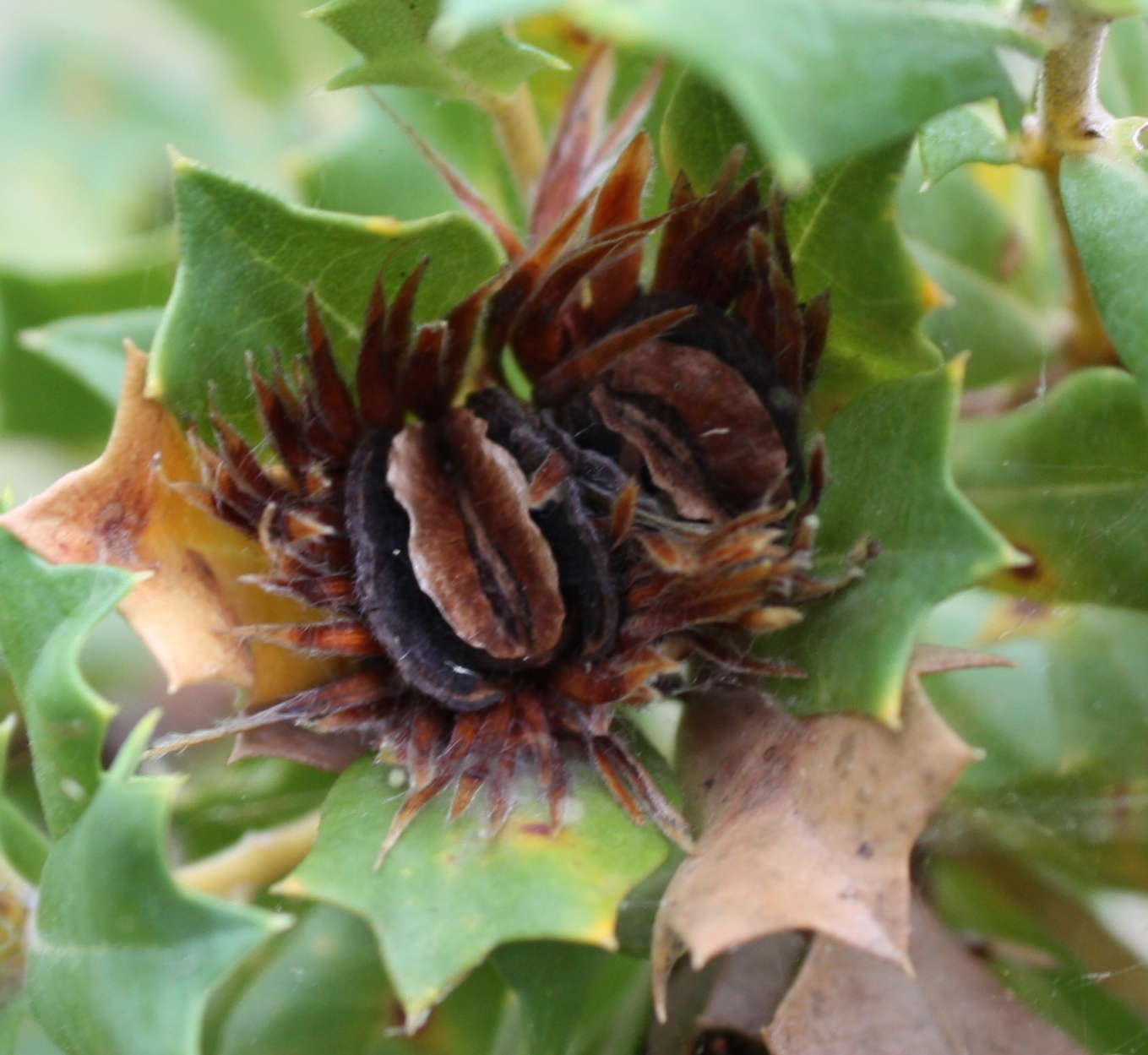
Open follicles with seed separators

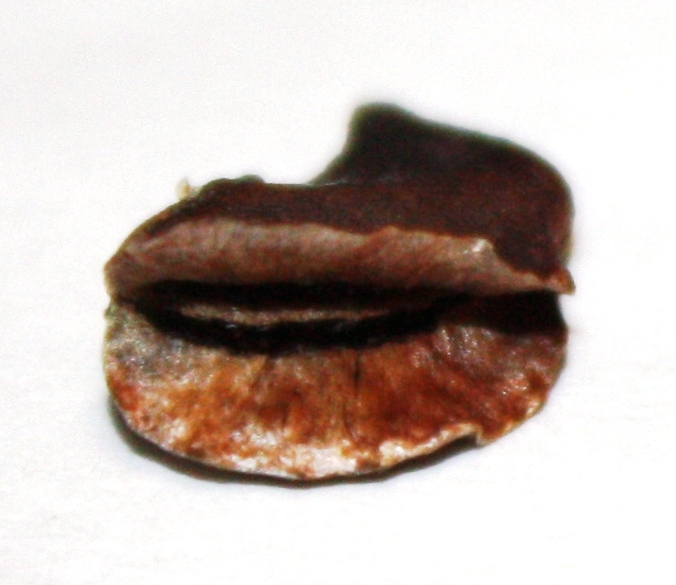
Seed separator

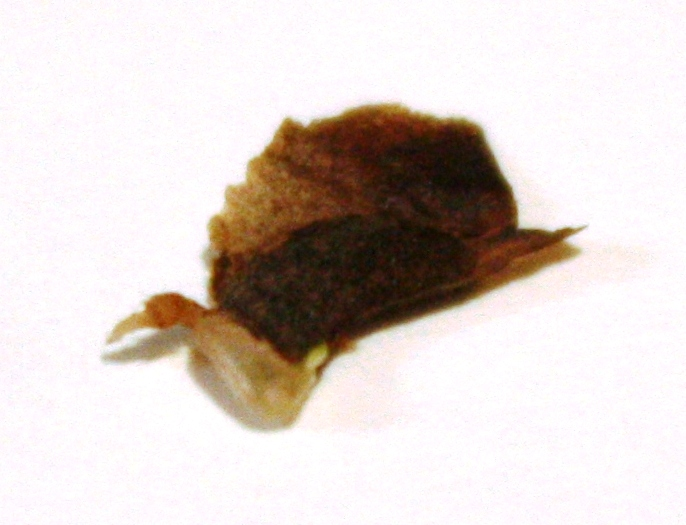
Seed

== Discovery and naming ==
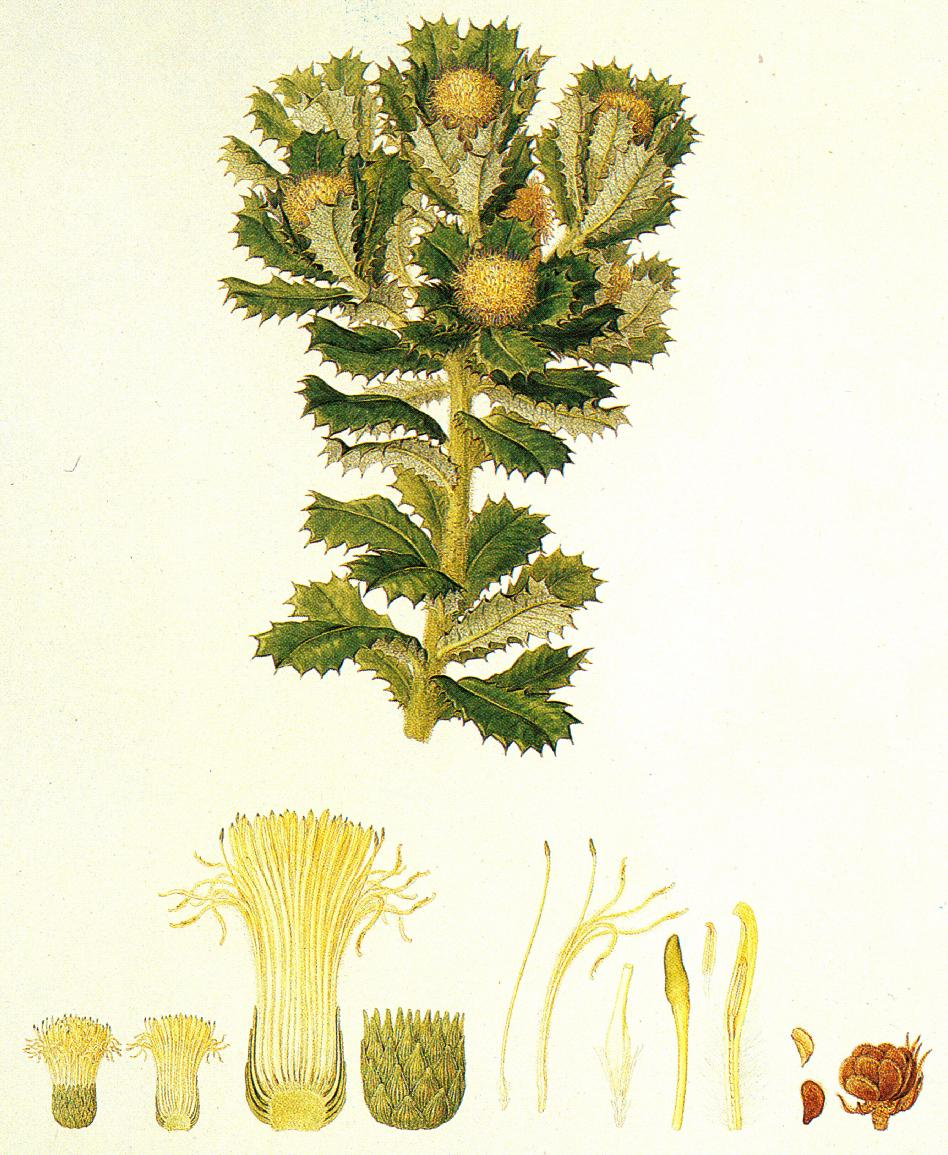
Ferdinand Bauer's painting of B. sessilis, based on drawings made by him at King George Sound in December 1801

Specimens of B. sessilis were first collected by Scottish surgeon Archibald Menzies during the visit of the Vancouver Expedition to King George Sound in September and October 1791. No firm location or collection date can be ascribed to Menzies' specimens, as their labels simply read "New Holland, King Georges Sound, Mr. Arch. Menzies", and Menzies' journal indicates that he collected over a wide area, visiting a different location every day from 29 September to 8 October. In addition to B. sessilis, Menzies collected plant material of B. pellaeifolia, and seeds of at least four more Banksia species. This was therefore an important early collection for the genus, only seven species of which had previously been collected.

Menzies' seed specimens were sent to England from Sydney in 1793, but his plant material remained with him for the duration of the voyage, during which some material was lost. On his return to England in 1795, the surviving specimens were deposited into the herbarium of Sir Joseph Banks, where they lay undescribed for many years.

The next collection was made in December 1801, when King George Sound was visited by HMS Investigator under the command of Matthew Flinders. On board were botanist Robert Brown, botanical artist Ferdinand Bauer, and gardener Peter Good. All three men gathered material for Brown's specimen collection, including specimens of B. sessilis, but neither Brown's nor Good's diary can be used to assign a precise location or date for their discovery of the species. Good also made a separate seed collection, which included B. sessilis, and the species was drawn by Bauer. Like nearly all of his field drawings of Proteaceae, Bauer's original field sketch of B. sessilis was destroyed in a Hofburg fire in 1945. A painting based on the drawing survives, however, at the Natural History Museum in London.

On returning to England in 1805, Brown began preparing an account of his Australian plant specimens. In September 1808, with Brown's account still far from finished, Swedish botanist Jonas Dryander asked him to prepare a separate paper on the Proteaceae so he could use the genera erected by Brown in a new edition of Hortus Kewensis. Brown immediately began a study of the Proteaceae, and in January 1809 he read to the Linnean Society of London a monograph on the family entitled On the Proteaceae of Jussieu. Among the eighteen new genera presented was one that Brown named Josephia in honour of Banks.

Brown's paper was approved for printing in May 1809, but did not appear in print until March the following year. In the meantime, Joseph Knight published On the cultivation of the plants belonging to the natural order of Proteeae, which appeared to draw heavily on Brown's unpublished material, without permission, and in most cases without attribution. It contained the first publication of Brown's Josephia, for which two species were listed. The first, Josephia sessilis, was based on one of Menzies' specimens: "This species, discovered by Mr. A. Menzies on the West coast of New Holland, is not unlike some varieties of Ilex aquifolium, and now in his Majesty's collection at Kew." The etymology of the specific epithet was not explicitly stated, but it is universally accepted that it comes from the Latin sessilis (sessile, stalkless), in reference to the sessile leaves of this species. Blame for the alleged plagiarism largely fell on Richard Salisbury, who had been present at Brown's readings and is thought to have provided much of the material for Knight's book. Salisbury was ostracized by the botanical community, which undertook to ignore his work as much as possible. By the time Brown's monograph appeared in print, Brown had exchanged the generic name Josephia for Dryandra, giving the name Dryandra floribunda to Knight's Josephia sessilis. As there were then no firm rules pertaining to priority of publication, Brown's name was accepted, and remained the current name for over a century.

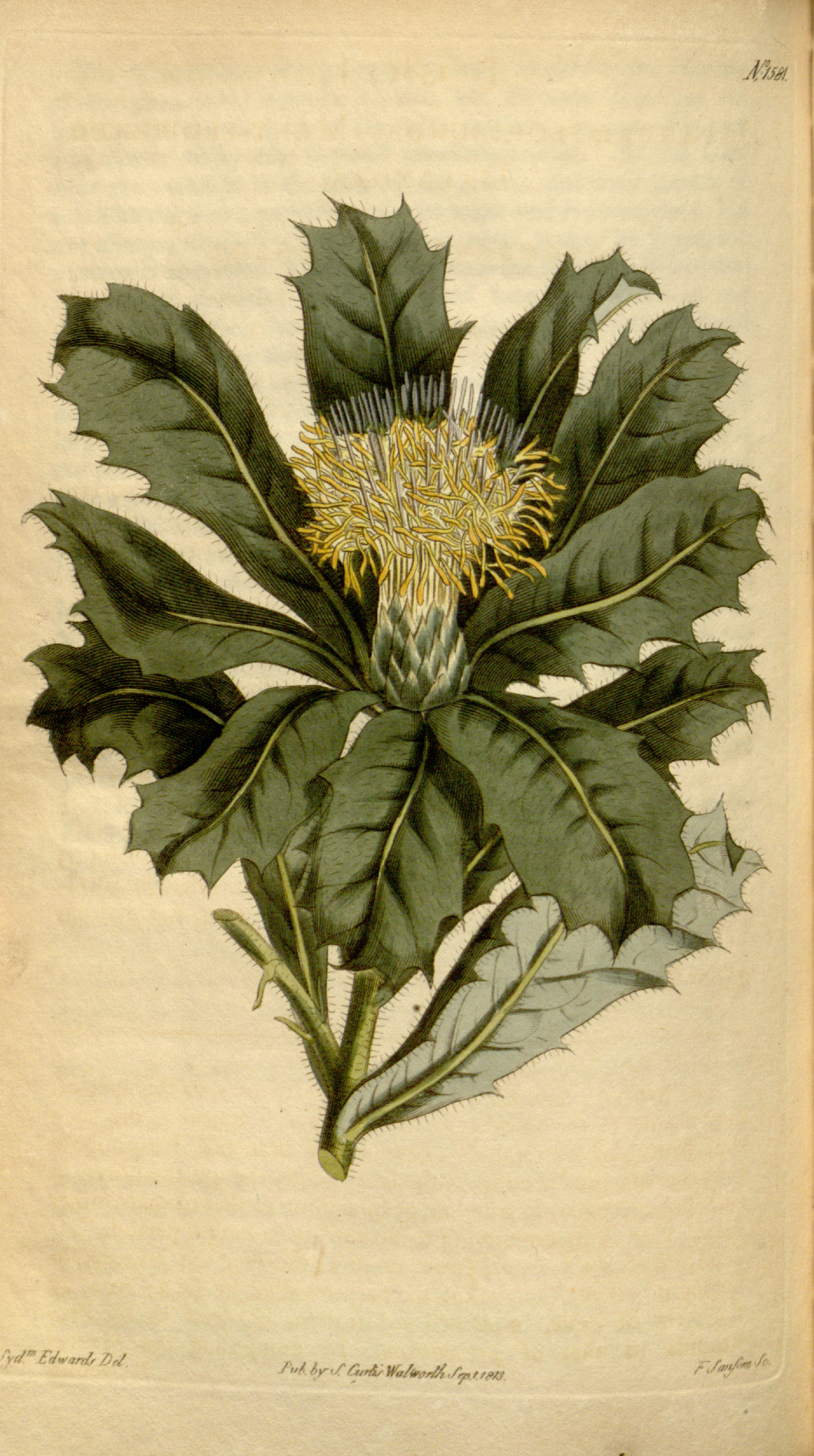
In 1813, Curtis's Botanical Magazine featured a colour plate of a painting by Sydenham Edwards, modelled on a specimen grown from seed collected by Peter Good in 1801–02.

Another significant early collection was the apparent discovery of the species at the Swan River in 1827. In that year, the colonial botanist of New South Wales Charles Fraser visited the area as part of an exploring expedition under James Stirling. Among the plants Fraser found growing on the south side of the river entrance was "a beautiful species of Dryandra", which was probably this species.

Over the course of the 19th century, the principle of priority in naming gradually came to be accepted by botanists, as did the need for a mechanism by which names in current usage could be conserved against archaic or obscure prior names. By the 1920s, Dryandra R.Br. was effectively conserved against Josephia Knight; a mechanism for formal conservation was put in place in 1933. Brown's specific name, however, was not conserved, and Karel Domin overturned Dryandra floribunda R.Br. by transferring Knight's name into Dryandra as Dryandra sessilis (Knight) Domin in 1924. This name was current until 2007, when all Dryandra species were transferred into Banksia by Austin Mast and Kevin Thiele. The full citation for the current name is thus Banksia sessilis (Knight) A.R.Mast & K.R.Thiele.

=== Common names ===
The first common names for this species were literal translations of the scientific names. When published as Josephia sessilis in 1809, it was given the common name sessile Josephia. Brown did not offer a common name when he published Dryandra floribunda in 1810, but later that year the Hortus Kewensis translated it as many flowered dryandra. This name was also used when the plant was featured in Curtis's Botanical Magazine in 1813. In Australia, the names prickly banksia and shaving-brush flower were offered up by Emily Pelloe in 1921, the latter because "when in bud the flower very much resembles a shaving-brush". Shaving-brush flower was still in use as late as the 1950s. The name holly-leaved dryandra was used when the plant was featured as part of a series of articles in the Western Mail of 1933–34, and this was taken up by William Blackall in 1954, and was still in use as late as 1970. Meanwhile, Gardner used the name parrot bush in 1959, a name derived from the observation that the blooms attract parrots, by which the species was already "well-known to bee-keepers". This name was widely adopted, and since 1970 has been in almost exclusive usage.

The only indigenous names reported for the plant are Budjan and But-yak. These were published by Ian Abbott in his 1983 Aboriginal Names for Plant Species in South-western Australia, with Abbott suggesting that the latter name should be preferred, but with the orthography "Pudjak". However, Abbott sources these names to George Fletcher Moore's 1842 A Descriptive Vocabulary of the Language of the Aborigines, which in fact attributes these names to the species Dryandra fraseri (now Banksia fraseri). It is unclear whether Abbott has corrected Moore's error, or introduced an error of his own.

== Taxonomy ==
=== Infrageneric placement ===
Brown's 1810 monograph did not include an infrageneric classification of Dryandra, and neither did his Prodromus, published later that year. In 1830, however, he introduced the first taxonomic arrangement of Dryandra, placing D. floribunda in section Dryandra verae along with most other species, because its follicles contain a single seed separator. Dryandra verae was renamed Eudryandra by Carl Meissner in 1845. Eleven years later Meissner published a new arrangement, retaining D. floribunda in D. sect. Eudryandra, and further placing it in the unranked subgroup § Ilicinae, because of the similarity of its leaves to those of Ilex (holly). In 1870, George Bentham published a revised arrangement in his Flora Australiensis. Bentham retained section Eudryandra, but abandoned almost all of Meissner's unranked groups, including § Ilicinae. D. floribunda was instead placed in D. ser. Floribundae along with four other species with small, mostly terminal flowers, left exposed by their having unusually short floral leaves.

Bentham's arrangement stood for over a hundred years, eventually replaced in 1996 by the arrangement of Alex George. Section Eudryandra was promoted to subgenus rank, but replaced by the autonym D. subg. Dryandra. D. sessilis, as this species was now called, was retained in D. ser. Floribundae, but alone, as the series was redefined as containing only those taxa that apparently lack floral bracts altogether. The placement of D. sessilis in George's arrangement, with 1999 and 2005 amendments, may be summarised as follows:

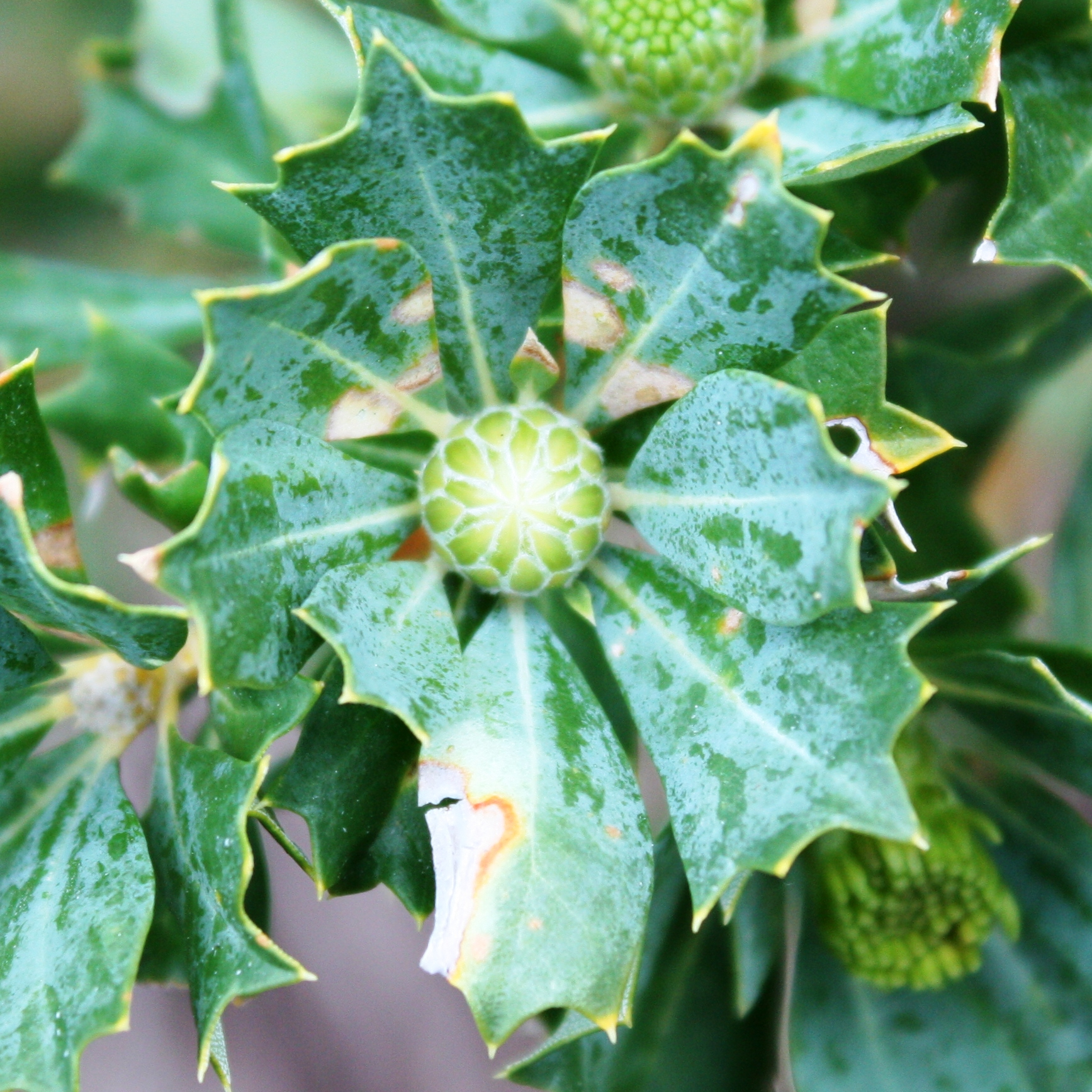
Inflorescence bud, closed

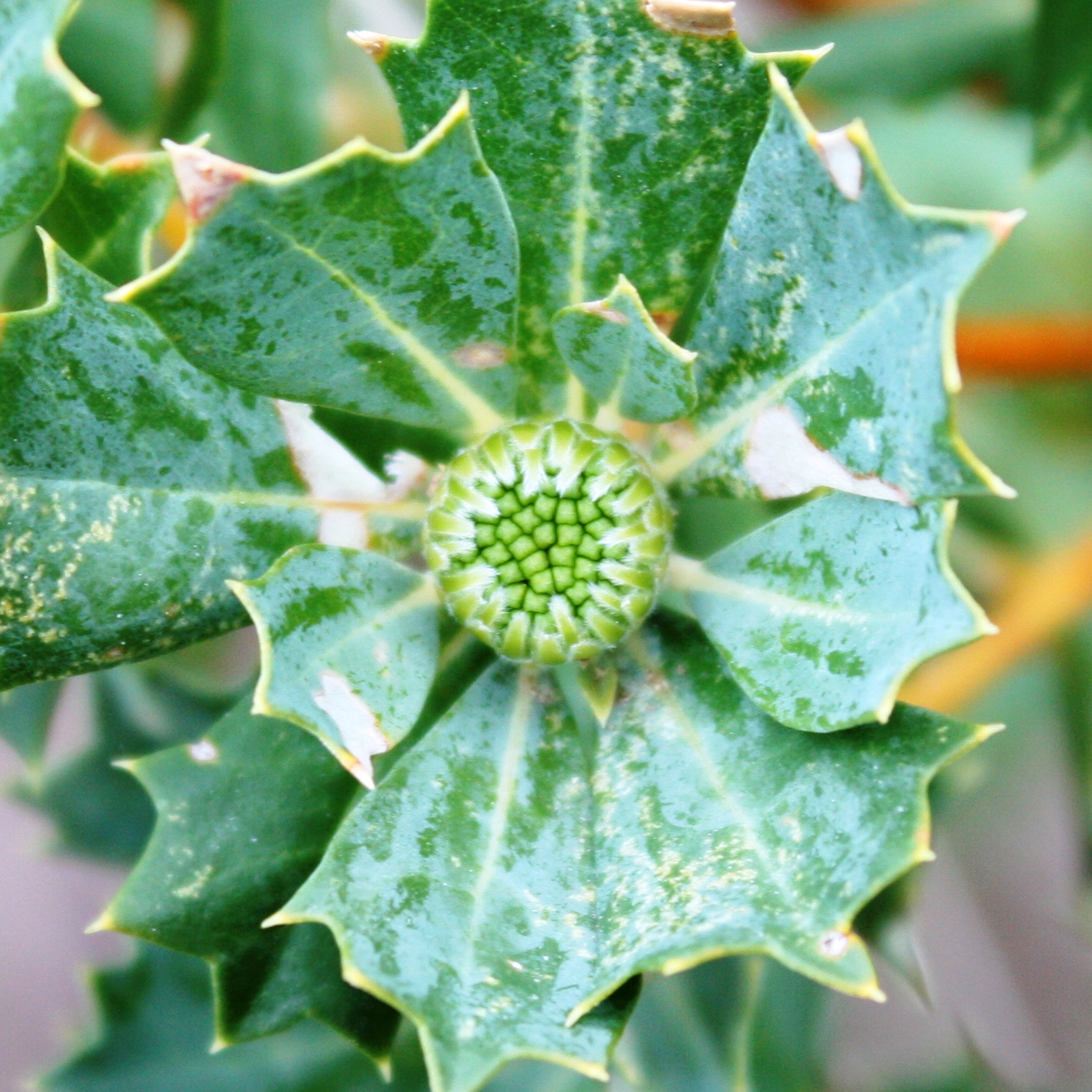
Inflorescence bud, beginning to open

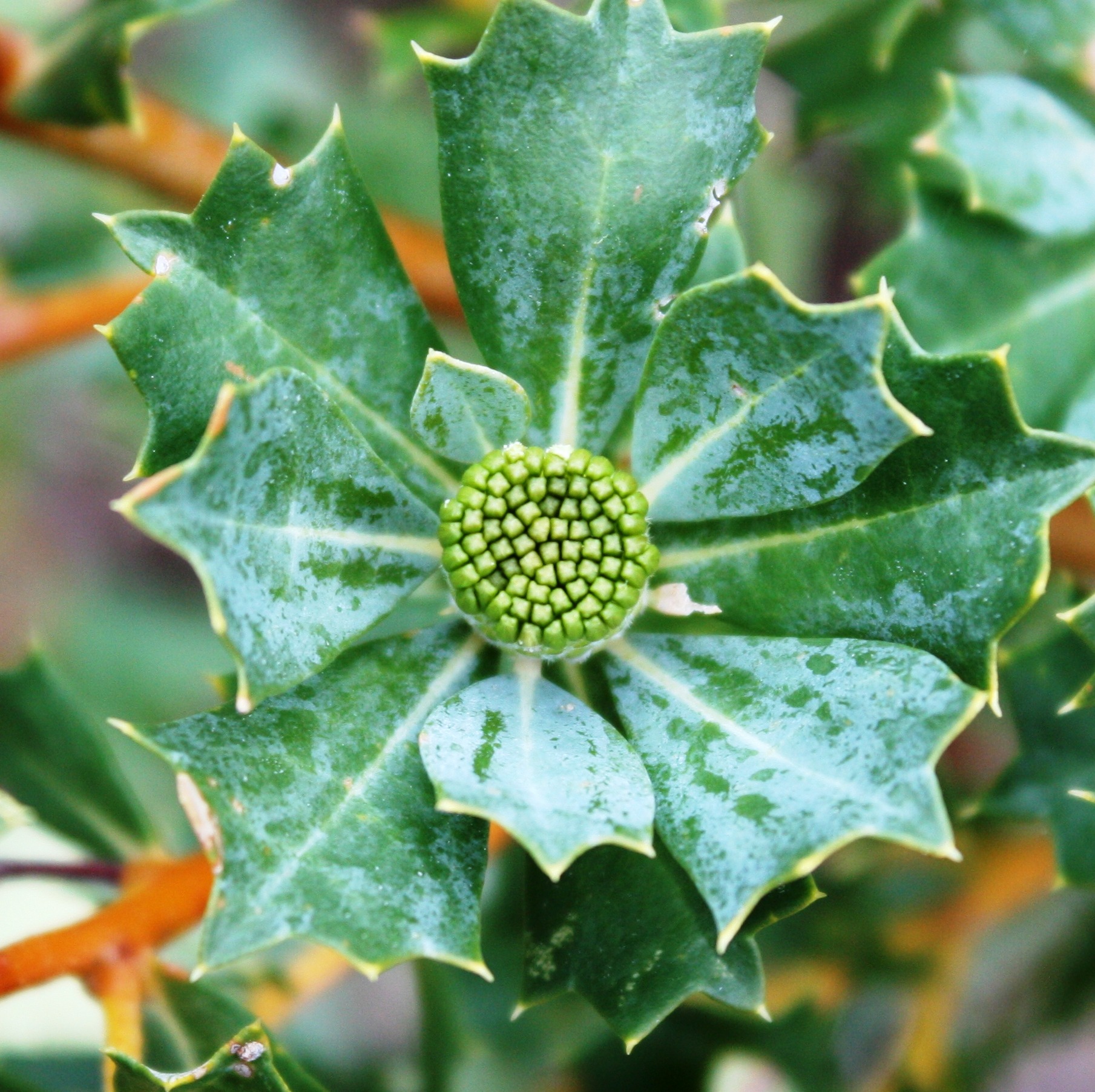
Inflorescence bud, opening

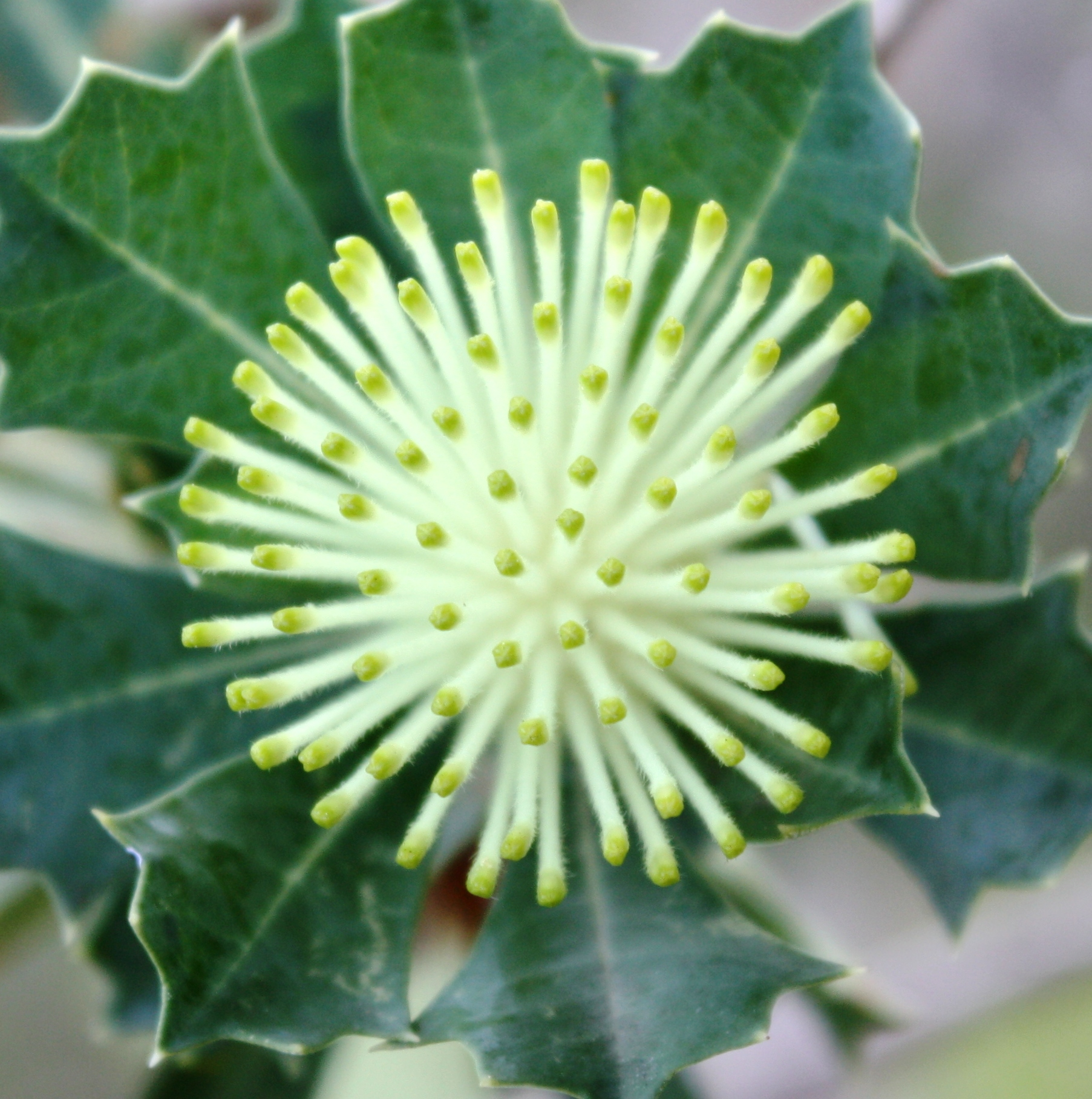
Inflorescence fully open, flowers closed

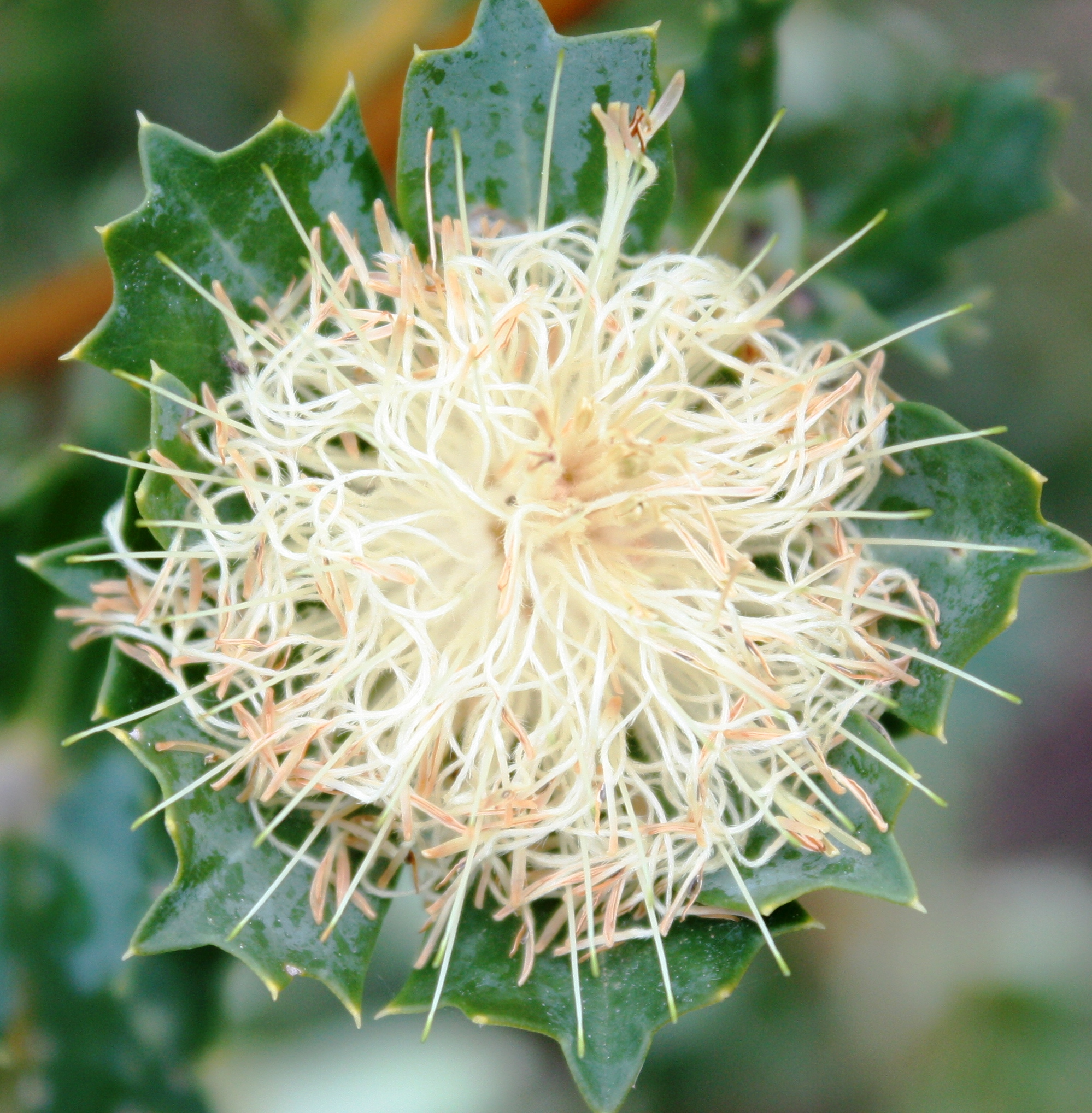
Flowers open

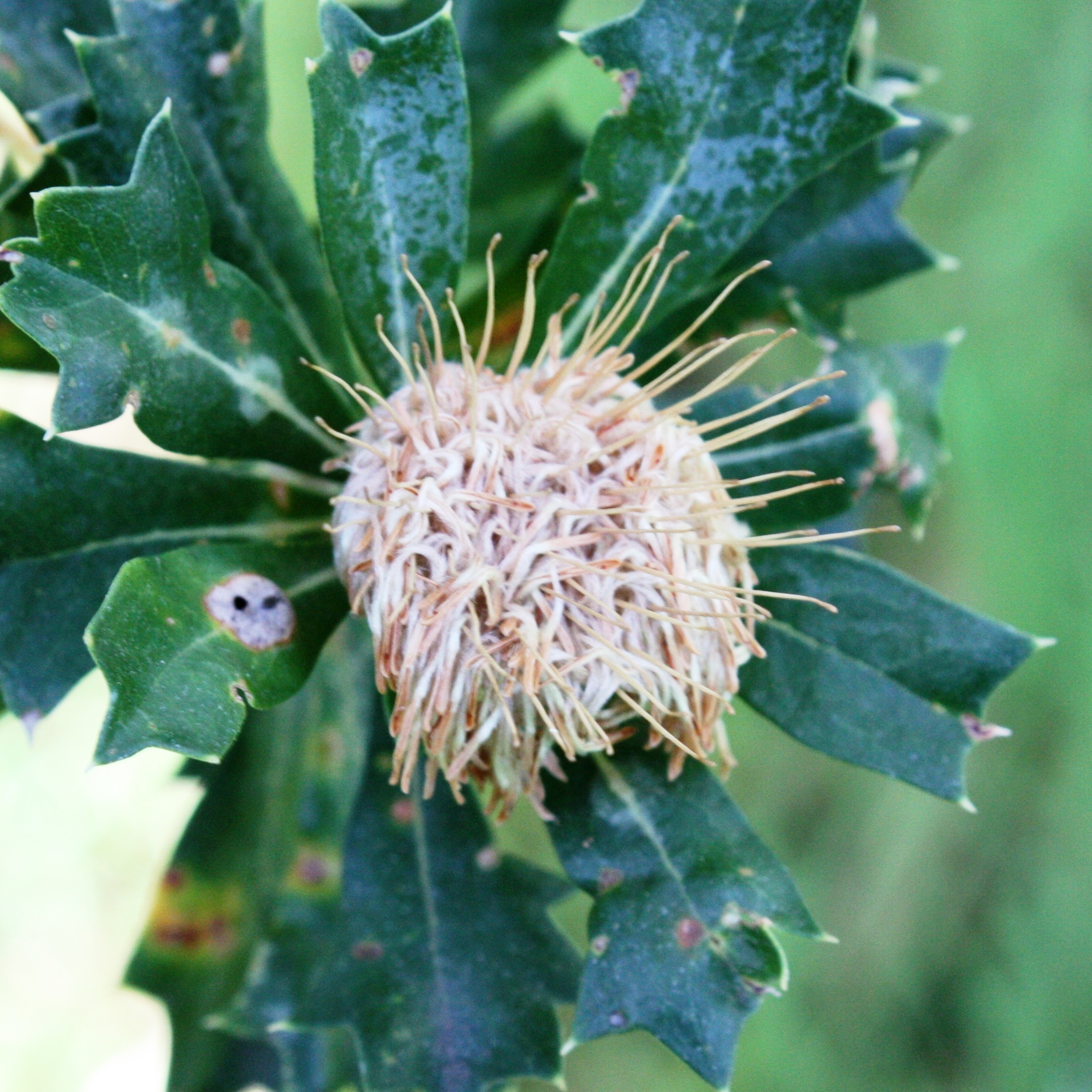
Flowers withering, soon to fall

Dryandra (now Banksia ser. Dryandra)

D. subg. Dryandra

D. ser. Floribundae

D. sessilis (now B. sessilis)

D. sessilis var. sessilis (now B. sessilis var. sessilis)
D. sessilis var. flabellifolia (now B. sessilis var. flabellifolia)
D. sessilis var. cordata (now B. sessilis var. cordata)
D. sessilis var. cygnorum (now B. sessilis var. cygnorum)

D. ser. Armatae
D. ser. Marginatae
D. ser. Folliculosae
D. ser. Acrodontae
D. ser. Capitellatae
D. ser. Ilicinae
D. ser. Dryandra
D. ser. Foliosae
D. ser. Decurrentes
D. ser. Tenuifoliae
D. ser. Runcinatae
D. ser. Triangulares
D. ser. Aphragma
D. ser. Ionthocarpae
D. ser. Inusitatae
D. ser. Subulatae
D. ser. Gymnocephalae
D. ser. Plumosae
D. ser. Concinnae
D. ser. Obvallatae
D. ser. Pectinatae
D. ser. Acuminatae
D. ser. Niveae

D. subg. Hemiclidia
D. subg. Diplophragma

George's arrangement remained current until 2007, when Austin Mast and Kevin Thiele transferred Dryandra into Banksia. They also published B. subg. Spathulatae for the Banksia taxa having spoon-shaped cotyledons, thus redefining B. subg. Banksia as comprising those that do not. They were not ready, however, to tender an infrageneric arrangement encompassing Dryandra, so as an interim measure they transferred Dryandra into Banksia at series rank. This minimised the nomenclatural disruption of the transfer, but also caused George's rich infrageneric arrangement to be set aside. Thus under the interim arrangements implemented by Mast and Thiele, B. sessilis is placed in B. subg. Banksia, ser. Dryandra.

=== Varieties ===
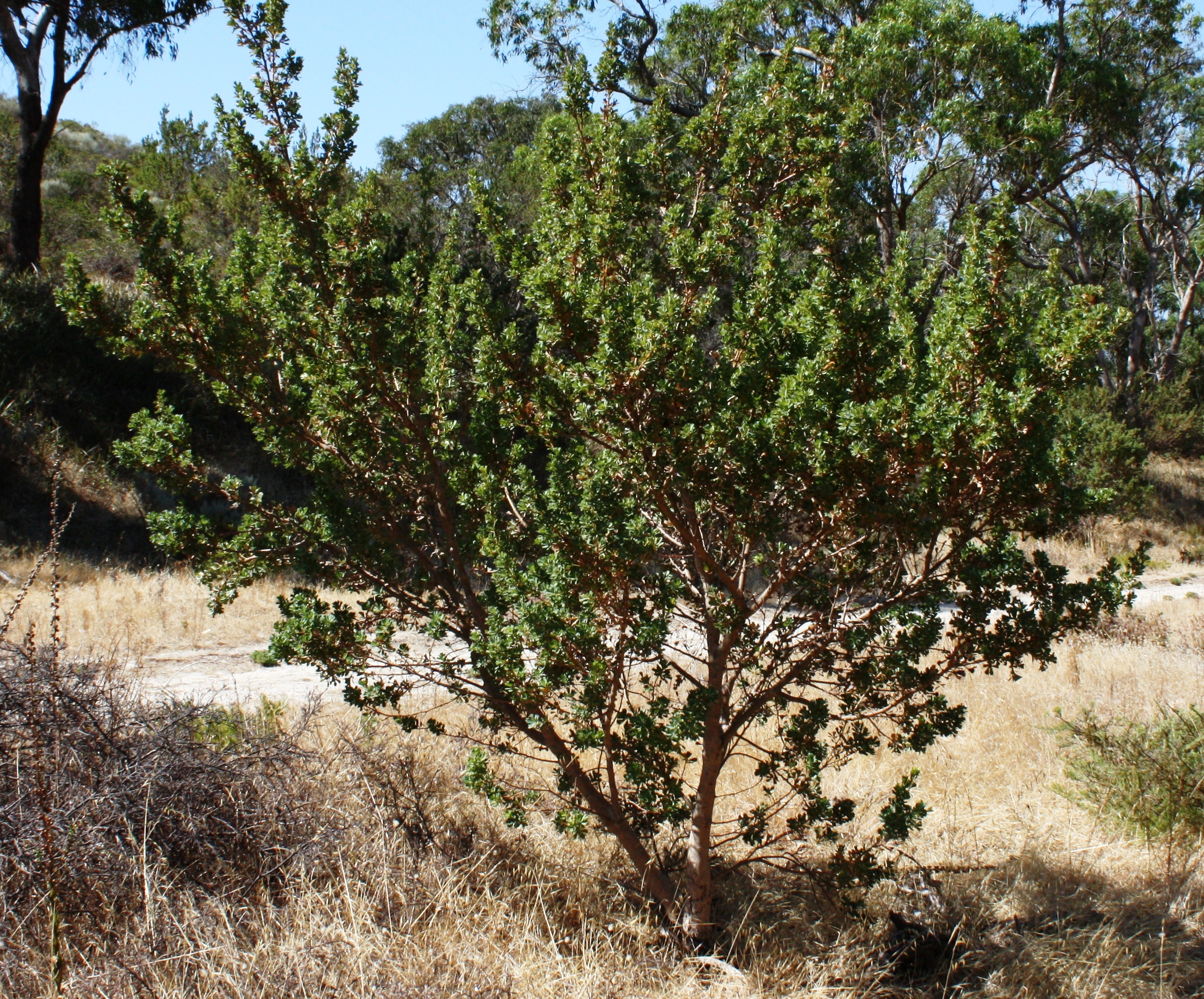
Typical habit: a small upright shrub

Four varieties are recognised:

- B. sessilis var. sessilis is an autonym that encompasses the type material of the species. This is the most widespread variety, occurring from Regans Ford and Moora in the north, south-east to Albany, and inland as far as Wongan Hills, Pingelly and Kulin. Its blue-green leaves are cuneate (wedge-shaped) or oblong, and are usually two to three centimetres long but may reach five.
- B. sessilis var. cordata was published as Dryandra floribunda var. cordata by Carl Meissner in 1848. In 1870, George Bentham published D. floribunda var. major, but this is now considered a taxonomic synonym of B. sessilis var. cordata. It has larger inflorescences than var. sessilis, as well as larger dark green, rather than blue green leaves. It is found in the state's far southwest, between Capes Leeuwin and Naturaliste, and east to Walpole, and grows on sandy soils over limestone.
- B. sessilis var. cygnorum has its roots in Michel Gandoger's publication of two new species names in 1919. He published Dryandra cygnorum and Dryandra quinquedentata, but in 1996 both of these were found to refer to the same taxon, which Alex George gave variety rank as Dryandra sessilis var. cygnorum. The term cygnorum is Latin for 'of swans' and relates to the Swan River, which runs past the suburb of Melville where the type material was collected. It has smaller dark green leaves only 2–3 cm (1–1 in) long and 0.8–1.7 cm (0.31–0.67 in) wide, whose teeth are limited to the distal part of the leaf. The range is along the Western Australian coastline from Dongara southwards past Fremantle, and east to Lake Indoon and Kings Park.
- B. sessilis var. flabellifolia was published by George in 1996, the type specimen having been collected northwest of Northampton in 1993. The northernmost of the four varieties, it is found from Kalbarri south to Geraldton and Northampton. There are some scattered records further south towards Moora. Its varietal name is derived from the Latin flabellum 'fan' and folium 'leaf'. Its leaves are fan shaped, with a long, toothless lower margin, and a toothed end. Its stems are hairless, unlike the other varieties.

== Distribution and habitat ==
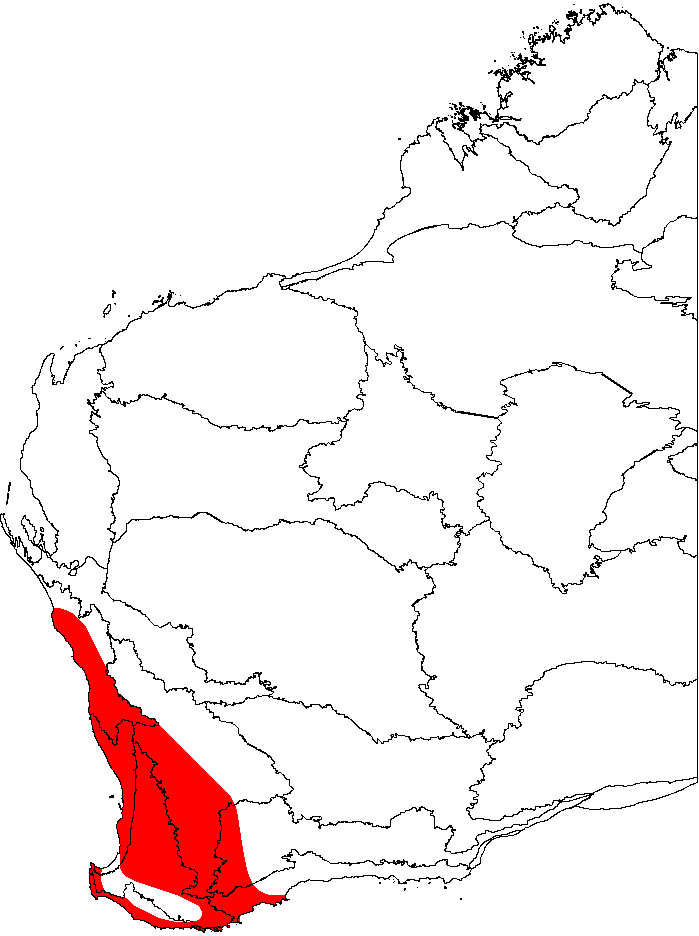
Distribution of B. sessilis, shown on a map of Western Australia's biogeographic regions.

Banksia sessilis is endemic to the Southwest Botanical Province, a floristic province renowned as a biodiversity hotspot, located in the southwest corner of Western Australia. This area has a Mediterranean climate, with wet winters and hot, dry summers. B. sessilis occurs throughout much of the province, ranging from Kalbarri in the north, south to Cape Leeuwin, east along the south coast as far as Bremer Bay, and inland to Wongan Hills and Kulin. It thus spans a wide range of climates, occurring in all but the semi-arid areas well inland. It is also absent from the Karri forest in the cool, wet, southwest corner of the province, but even there, B. sessilis var. cordata occurs along the coast.

The species tolerates a range of soils, requiring only that its soil be well-drained. Like most dryandras, it grows well in lateritic soils and gravels; this species is also found in deep sand, sand over laterite, and sand over limestone. It also occurs in a range of vegetation complexes, including coastal and kwongan heath, tall shrubland, woodland and open forest. It is a common understorey plant in drier areas of Jarrah forest, and forms thickets on limestone soils of the Swan Coastal Plain. Banksia sessilis sets a large amount of seed and is an aggressive coloniser of disturbed and open areas; for example, it has been recorded colonising gravel pits in the Darling Scarp.

Nothing is known of the conditions that affect its distribution, as its biogeography is as yet unstudied. An assessment of the potential impact of climate change on this species found that its range is likely to contract by half in the face of severe change, but unlikely to change much under less severe scenarios.

== Ecology ==
=== As food ===
The nectar of B. sessilis is an important component of the diet of several species of honeyeater. In one study, B. sessilis was found to be the main source of nectar for all six species studied, namely the tawny-crowned honeyeater (Gliciphila melanops), white-cheeked honeyeater (Phylidonyris niger), western spinebill (Acanthorhynchus superciliosus), brown honeyeater (Lichmera indistincta), brown-headed honeyeater (Melithreptus brevirostris), and black honeyeater (Sugomel nigrum). Moreover, B. sessilis played an important role in their distributions, with species that feed only on nectar occurring only where B. sessilis occurs, and remaining for longest at sites where B. sessilis is most abundant. Other honeyeaters that have been recorded feeding on B. sessilis include the red wattlebird (Anthochaera carunculata), western wattlebird (A. lunulata), and New Holland honeyeater (Phylidonyris novaehollandiae). Furthermore, a study of bird species diversity in wandoo woodland around Bakers Hill found that honeyeater species and numbers were much reduced in forest that lacked a Banksia sessilis understory; the plant is a key source of nectar and insects during the winter months. A field study in jarrah forest 9 km south of Jarrahdale, where B. sessilis grows in scattered clumps, found that western wattlebirds and New Holland honeyeaters sought out groups of plants with the greatest numbers of new inflorescences, particularly those one or two days after anthesis, where nectar yield was highest. The birds likely recognises these by visual clues.

Banksia sessilis is also a source of food for the Australian ringneck (Barnardius zonarius), and the long-billed black cockatoo (Zanda baudinii), which tear open the follicles and consume the seeds. The introduced European honey bee (Apis mellifera) has also been observed feeding on B. sessilis, as have seven species of native bee, comprising four species of Hylaeus (including the banksia bee H. alcyoneus), two of Leioproctus, and a Lasioglossum.

=== Life cycle ===
Honeyeaters are clearly the most important pollination vector, as inflorescences from which honeyeaters are excluded generally do not set any fruit. Moreover, honeyeaters have been observed moving from tree to tree with significant loads of B. sessilis pollen on their foreheads, beaks and throats, having acquired it by brushing against pollen presenters while foraging for nectar; experiments have shown that some of this pollen may be subsequently deposited on stigmas during later foraging.

The flowers of B. sessilis have adaptations that encourage outcrossing. Firstly, they are protandrous: a flower's pollen is released around 72 hours before it becomes itself receptive to pollen, by which time around half of its pollen has lost its viability. Secondly, the period of maximum nectar production closely matches the period during which the flower is sexually active, so honeyeaters are enticed to visit at the most opportune time for pollination. This has proven an effective strategy: almost all pollen is removed within two to three hours of presentation. In addition, honeyeaters tend to move between inflorescences on different plants, rather than between inflorescences on the same plant, at least in high density sites. These factors combine to make it fairly unusual for a flower to be fertilised by its own pollen. When self-fertilisation does occur, whether autogamous or geitonogamous, the resulting seed is almost always aborted, and the species ultimately achieves an outcrossing rate of nearly 100%, at least in high density sites. Limited data for low-density sites, where honeyeaters move from plant to plant less frequently, suggest more of a Mixed mating systems.

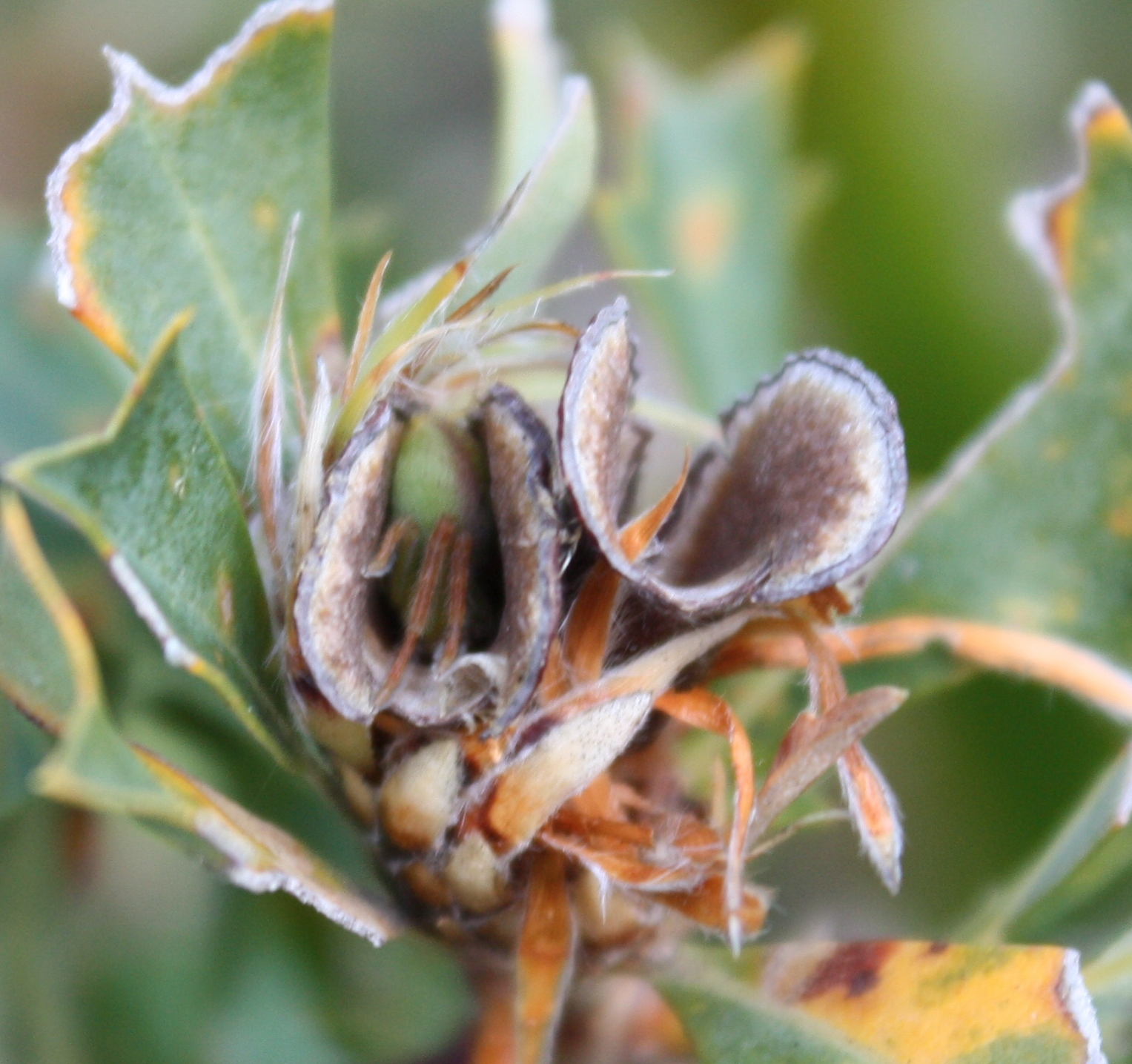
A bug hides inside an open follicle.

The species is a prolific flowerer, and this, combined with the very high outcrossing rates, results in massive seed output. In one study, the average number of seeds produced per B. sessilis plant was 622, compared with an average of two for B. dallanneyi. This exceptionally high fecundity can be understood as an adaption to regular bushfire. Most Banksia species can be placed in one of two broad groups according to their response to fire: resprouters survive fire, resprouting from a lignotuber or, more rarely, epicormic buds protected by thick bark; reseeders are killed by fire, but populations are rapidly re-established through the recruitment of seedlings. B. sessilis is a reseeder, but it differs from many other reseeders in not being strongly serotinous: the vast majority of seeds are released spontaneously in autumn, even in the absence of fire. The degree of serotiny is a matter of some contradiction in the scientific literature: it has been treated as 'serotinous', 'weakly serotinous' and 'non-serotinous'. Regardless of the terminology used, the massive spontaneous seed output of B. sessilis is its primary survival strategy, and is so effective the species has a reputation as an excellent coloniser. However, this strategy, together with its relatively long juvenile period, makes it vulnerable to overly frequent fire.

Seeds of B. sessilis are short-lived, and must germinate in the winter following their release, or they die. They are also very sensitive to heating, and thus killed by bushfire; in one study, just 30 seconds in boiling water reduced the germination rate from 85% to 22%, and not a single seed survived one minute of boiling.

Like most other Proteaceae, B. sessilis has compound cluster roots, roots with dense clusters of short lateral rootlets that form a mat in the soil just below the leaf litter. These exude a range of carboxylates, including citrate, malonate and trans-aconitate, that act as acid phosphatase, allowing the absorption of nutrients from nutrient-poor soils, such as the phosphorus-deficient native soils of Australia.

=== Disease ===
Banksia sessilis is highly susceptible to dieback caused by the introduced plant pathogen Phytophthora cinnamomi, a soil-borne water mould that causes root rot; in fact it is so reliably susceptible it is considered a good indicator species for the presence of the disease. Most highly susceptible species quickly become locally extinct in infected areas, and in the absence of hosts the disease itself eventually dies out. However, B. sessilis, being an aggressive coloniser of disturbed and open ground, often colonises old disease sites. The new colonies are themselves infected, and thus P. cinnamomi survives at these sites indefinitely.

The application of phosphite inhibits growth of P. cinnamomi in B. sessilis, but does not kill the pathogen. In one study, a foliar spray containing phosphite inhibited the growth of P. cinnamomi by over 90% in plants infected two weeks after spraying, and by 66% in plants infected one year after spraying; yet most plants infected shortly before or after spraying were dead 100 days later, while nearly all plants infected seven months after spraying survived a further 100 days. Phosphite is not known to affect plant growth, but has been shown to reduce pollen fertility: one study recorded fertility reductions of up to 50%, and, in a separate experiment, fertility reductions that persisted for more than a year.

Infection of coastal stands of B. sessilis by the fungus Armillaria luteobubalina has also been recorded. The apparent infection rate of 0.31 is quite slow compared to the progress of other Armillaria species through pine plantations.

== Cultivation ==
=== History ===
It is not known whether the seed collection sent to the Royal Botanic Gardens, Kew, by Menzies in 1793 included seeds of B. sessilis, but if it did they didn't germinate. The species was successfully germinated, however, from Good's seed, which was sent from Sydney on 6 June 1802 and arrived at Kew the following year. According to Brown's notes it was flowering at Kew by May 1806, and in 1810 it was reported in the second edition of Hortus Kewensis as flowering "most part of the Year". In 1813 a flowering specimen from the nursery of Malcolm and Sweet was featured as Plate 1581 in Curtis's Botanical Magazine.

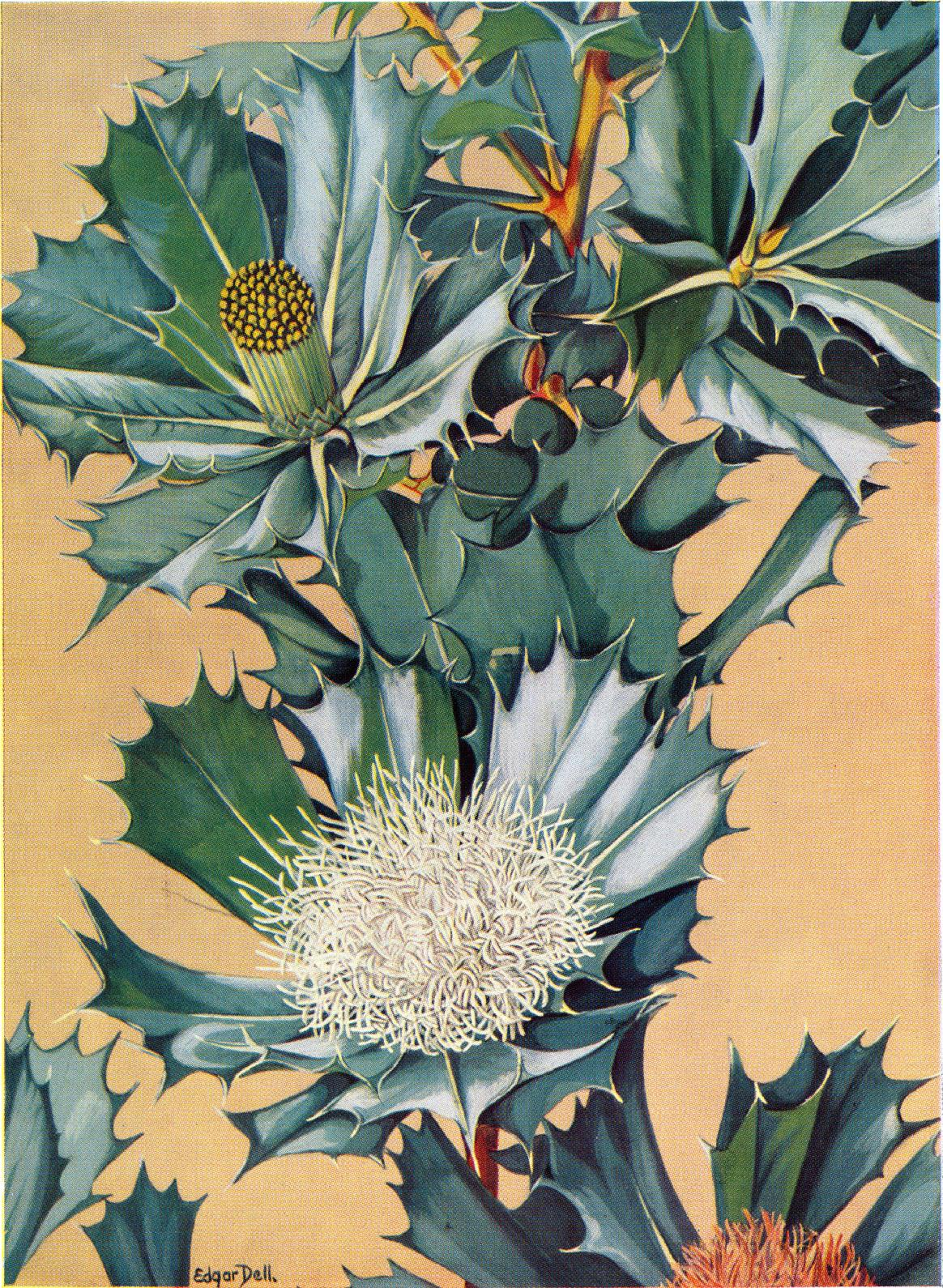
Edgar Dell's painting of B. sessilis, first published in The Western Mail in 1933 or 1934

By the 1830s the species was in cultivation in continental Europe. It was recorded as being cultivated in the garden of Karl von Hügel in Vienna, Austria in 1831, and in 1833 it was listed amongst the rare plants that had been introduced into Belgium. Along with several hundred other native Australian plants, it was exhibited at plant shows held at Utrecht and Haarlem in the Netherlands in the 1840s and 1850s. By this time, however, English gardeners had already begun to lose interest in the Proteaceae, and by the end of the 19th century European interest in the cultivation of Proteaceae was virtually non-existent.

In Australia, there was little interest in the cultivation of Australian plants until the mid-20th century, despite a long-standing appreciation of their beauty as wildflowers. For example, in 1933 and 1934 The Western Mail published a series of Edgar Dell paintings of Western Australian wildflowers, including a painting of B. sessilis. These were subsequently republished in Charles Gardner's 1935 West Australian Wild Flowers. One of the first published colour photographs of the species appeared in William Blackall's 1954 How to know Western Australian wildflowers, but this publication was restricted to plant identification. The species was discussed and illustrated in the 1959 Wildflowers of Western Australia, and in the 1973 Flowers and plants of Western Australia, but these books did not provide cultivation advice either.

Possibly the first published information on the cultivation of Dryandra appeared in the magazine Australian Plants in June and September 1961. D. sessilis was among the species treated, but as there was not yet any experimental data on cultivation, information was restricted to its aesthetic qualities and the soil in which it naturally occurs.

From its inception in 1962, the Kings Park and Botanic Garden undertook extensive research into the cultivation of native plants, resulting in two early publications that mentioned the cultivation potential of B. sessilis. In 1965, John Stanley Beard published Descriptive catalogue of Western Australian plants, "a work of reference in which the horticultural characteristics of the plants concerned could be looked up by the staff", which described D. sessilis as an erect shrub with pale yellow flowers appearing from May to October, growing in sand and gravel. Five years later, Arthur Fairall published West Australian native plants in cultivation. This presented largely the same information as Beard's catalogue, adding only that the species flowers well in its third season.

=== Current knowledge ===
According to current knowledge, B. sessilis is an extremely hardy plant that grows in a range of soils and aspects, so long as it is given good drainage, and tolerates both drought and moderate frost. Unlike many dryandras, it grows well on limestone (alkaline) soils. It flowers very heavily and is an excellent producer of honey. It attracts birds, and is also popular with beekeepers. However, its size makes it unsuitable for smaller gardens, and if given an ideal situation it may produce a great many seedlings. It is propagated only from seed, as propagating it from cuttings has proven virtually impossible. Germination takes about five or six weeks, and plants may take two years to flower.
