= Christiane Ritter =

Austrian writer (1897–2000)

Christiane Ritter (13 July 1897, in Karlsbad – 29 December 2000, in Vienna) was an Austrian painter and writer. She is best known, in English, for her book A Woman in the Polar Night about her stay on Svalbard in 1933. Originally published in 1938, and translated into English in 1954 by Jane Degras, her book is one of the few accounts written from a female perspective detailing life outside civilizations before the 20th century.
