= Robert-Rudolf Volk =

Estonian militant and sculptor (1921–2021)

- Born: 8 February 1921; Järva County, Estonia
- Died: 10 March 2021 (aged 100)
- Occupations: Militant; Sculptor

Robert-Rudolf Volk (8 February 1921 – 10 March 2021) was an Estonian militant sculptor. He was also a member of the Estonian Defence League.

== Biography ==
In 1938, Volk joined the Järva County regiment (Estonian: Kaitseliidu Järva malev) of the Estonian Defence League due to rising tensions in Europe. He was joined by a classmate from Paide Hammerbeck Secondary School whose father fought in the Estonian War of Independence. He fled the country during the Soviet occupation of the Baltic states but returned during the German occupation to study economics at the University of Tartu. In 1943, he was mobilized to join the Wehrmacht and assigned to the 36th Estonian Police Battalion, which sent him to Nevel. He returned to Estonia the following year and survived the March bombing in Tallinn. After World War II, he hid in the woods for two years but was eventually tracked down and imprisoned in 1946.

After his release in 1948, Volk began working as a sculptor. He continued this profession until 2008, when he retired.

Robert-Rudolf Volk died on 10 March 2021 at the age of 100.
