= Marilee Shapiro Asher =

American artist (1912–2020)

Marilee Shapiro Asher (née Harris; November 17, 1912 – September 11, 2020) was an American sculptor, author, and survivor of both the Spanish Flu and COVID-19.

== Early life ==
Marilee Harris was born on November 17, 1912, in Chicago, one of five children of Frank and Bonnie Harris. She contracted the Spanish Flu when she was six. She started studying sculpture in 1936.

== Career ==
Asher had her first solo exhibition at American University in 1947. She exhibited at Smart Museum, Vassar College, Franz Bader Gallery, Washington Studio School, Studio Gallery, the Cosmos Club and Warehouse Gallery.

In the early 2000s, when looking for a less physical form of art, she studied digital art at the Corcoran School of Art and started doing digital photography. In 2010, her photography was displayed at the Iona Guest Show when she was a visiting artist.

Her work is in the permanent collection of the Smithsonian and the Baltimore Museum of Art. In 2019, she was on the Ralph Nader Radio Hour discussing how she maintains her productive life at the age of 106. She wrote an autobiography entitled Dancing in the Wonder of 102 Years.

== Personal life and death ==
Asher was married twice: first to Bernard Shapiro in 1943, and later to Robert Asher in 1993. She had one son and one daughter from her first marriage. In April 2020, Asher went into the hospital with COVID-19 during the COVID-19 pandemic in Chicago. She spent five days in the hospital, before recovering and returning to the Chevy Chase House, where she lived. She died on September 11, 2020, at age 107.
