= Margery Ryerson =

American artist (1886–1989)

Margery Austen Ryerson
- Born: September 15, 1886; Morristown, New Jersey
- Died: March 30, 1989 (aged 102); Rye Brook, New York
- Education: Vassar College; Cape Cod School of Art; Art Students League
- Known for: Painting, printmaking, writing,
- Notable work: Painting Class Provincetown, (ca. 1920) Portrait of a Young Boy, (ca. 1920) Sunday Best, (ca. 1925) Woman Reading, (1915-1920)
- Style: Graphic Art, print

Margery Austen Ryerson (September 15, 1886 – March 30, 1989) was an American artist, painter, etcher, lithographer and watercolorist. Her work is included in the collections of the Smithsonian American Art Museum.

== Biography ==
Ryerson earned her Bachelor's of Fine Arts in English from Vassar College in Poughkeepsie, New York, after attending private schools in Morristown. She went on to study under Charles Hawthorne at the Cape Cod School of Art in Provincetown, Massachusetts, and with Robert Henri at the Art Students League in New York.

During the years 1920 through 1940 Ryerson taught in New York settlement houses. There she got the privilege to paint and draw the children in their care. The subjects of these paintings were often the children of the underclass and immigrants. Her artistic technique and subjects gained universal recognition and appealed to many people. Miss Ryerson is most known for her portraits, child genre paintings and etches. Her art frequently shows children or people doing common everyday activities, such as reading, knitting, playing with toys and sleeping. A key element of Ryerson's art that sets her apart from similar artists, is that she tends to portray the children in paintings alone, without the presence of a maternal figure. Margery Ryerson chose to depict children independently in pictures, partly from Robert Henri’s teachings that kids could be the subjects of paintings just as much as adults could. However, it is also because of the environment/ location that she painted in at the beginning of her career. At first she was not involved with families who could afford to pay for a portrait. So that’s when she became exposed to the less privileged children. Then later she sought out independent, self-reliant children. Ryerson has also painted landscapes, city scapes, nudes, and still-life.

== Achievements ==
The Associated American Artists NYC published a series of her etchings and lithographs. The United Nations has also used Ryerson’s work on greeting cards and stamps. Furthermore her art was included at many exhibitions. These exhibitions include…

- The Grand Central Art Galleries entitled Herni and Ryerson, the Art Spirit
- The Paris Salon (1921)
- The Art Institute of Chicago (1922)
- The Newark Museum entitled The Eight and Their Influence (1984)
- The Provincetown Artists’ Association and Museum (2008)

Her work is also held in the permanent collections of many institutions including, the Smithsonian, Bibliotheque Nationale in Paris and the Uffizi Gallery in Florence.

During her lifetime and artistic career she was represented by Chapellier, Macbeth and Grand Central Art Galleries in New York. Ryerson was also a member of many organizations, including, the National Academy of Design. Other organizations Ryerson was associated with include the Allied Artists of America, American Watercolor Society, Audubon Society of Artists, Brooklyn Society of Artists, National Academy of Design, National Arts Club, Society of American Etchers, Washington DC Watercolor Society, and Woodstock Art Association.

== Writing and editing experience ==
Ryerson was also involved in the creation of two well known art instruction books; Robert Henri’s The Art Spirit and Charles Hawthorne’s Hawthorne on Painting. Ryerson’s class notes and commentary contributed a lot to both books. Ryerson actually proposed the idea of creating a book to Robert Henri. They worked together to edit and complete the book. The Art Spirit is a very influential and popular book in the art community. The Art Spirit has been in publication ever since 1923.
