= Jean Donald Gow =

Canadian author and illustrator (1903–2005)

Jean Middleton Donald Gow (January 26, 1903 - November 6, 2005) was the president and founder of the Naval Reading Services for the Naval Service of Canada. She was also an author, illustrator, and a researcher and writer for Canadian Broadcasting Corporation.

== Early life ==
Gow was born Jean Middleton Donald in Hampshire, England, to Dr. (Colonel) David and Mrs. Donald. Her family immigrated to Victoria, British Columbia, in 1910. She grew up in Esquimalt.

She trained at the Royal Drawing Academy in London, earning a teacher-artist certificate. She then returned to British Columbia and participated in several art exhibitions. A collection of her sketches and watercolours from this time period is in the Royal British Columbia Museum.

In 1929, she married Lieutenant Commander Francis R.W.R. (Peter) Gow in England. They lived in England until 1935. They then lived in Halifax until 1938, and then were stationed in Esquimalt and Ottawa before returning to Halifax during the Second World War.

== Career ==
In 1940 Gow created an illustrated travel book, Quebec Patchwork. It was published by MacMillan. In 1942, Gow's husband died in a plane crash. She began to do volunteer work, including organizing a Naval Reading Service to provide naval personnel on ships with reading material.

After the war Gow worked as a librarian with the Department of National Defence, and later supported herself through illustrating and writing books. She began working for CBC in 1951; she wrote and did research for radio and television, covering children's shows, documentaries, and public affairs. She retired in 1968.

She published two more books, Design of Days (1988) and Alongside the Navy, 1910-1950 (1999). The latter covered her experiences as a navy wife living in Halifax, Esquimalt, and Ottawa. Gow spent 40 years completing research for a biography on Edward, Duke of Kent. This was never published. This research, as well as other documents, is in the Jean Donald Gow fonds at the Nova Scotia Archives.

== Death ==
Jean Gow died on November 6, 2005, in Ottawa, Ontario, at the age of 102.

== Publications ==
=== Author ===
- Quebec Patchwork], Macmillan Company of Canada limited, 1940 - Québec.
- Design of Days, 1988.
- Alongside the Navy, 1910-1950, 1999.
- Biography of Edward, Duke of Kent (unpublished)

=== Illustrator ===
- Peter the sea trout, Mel Thistle. New York : Bouregy & Curl, 1954.
- The Blue Circle Gang Frank Llewellyn Houghton. Toronto, Nelson, 1949
- I Like British Columbia Gwen Cash. Toronto - the MacMillan Company of Canada Limited, at St. Marten's House, 1938
