= Edgar Dell =

Western Australian painter

- Born: 28 November 1901; England
- Died: 18 April 2008 (aged 106)
- Occupation: painter

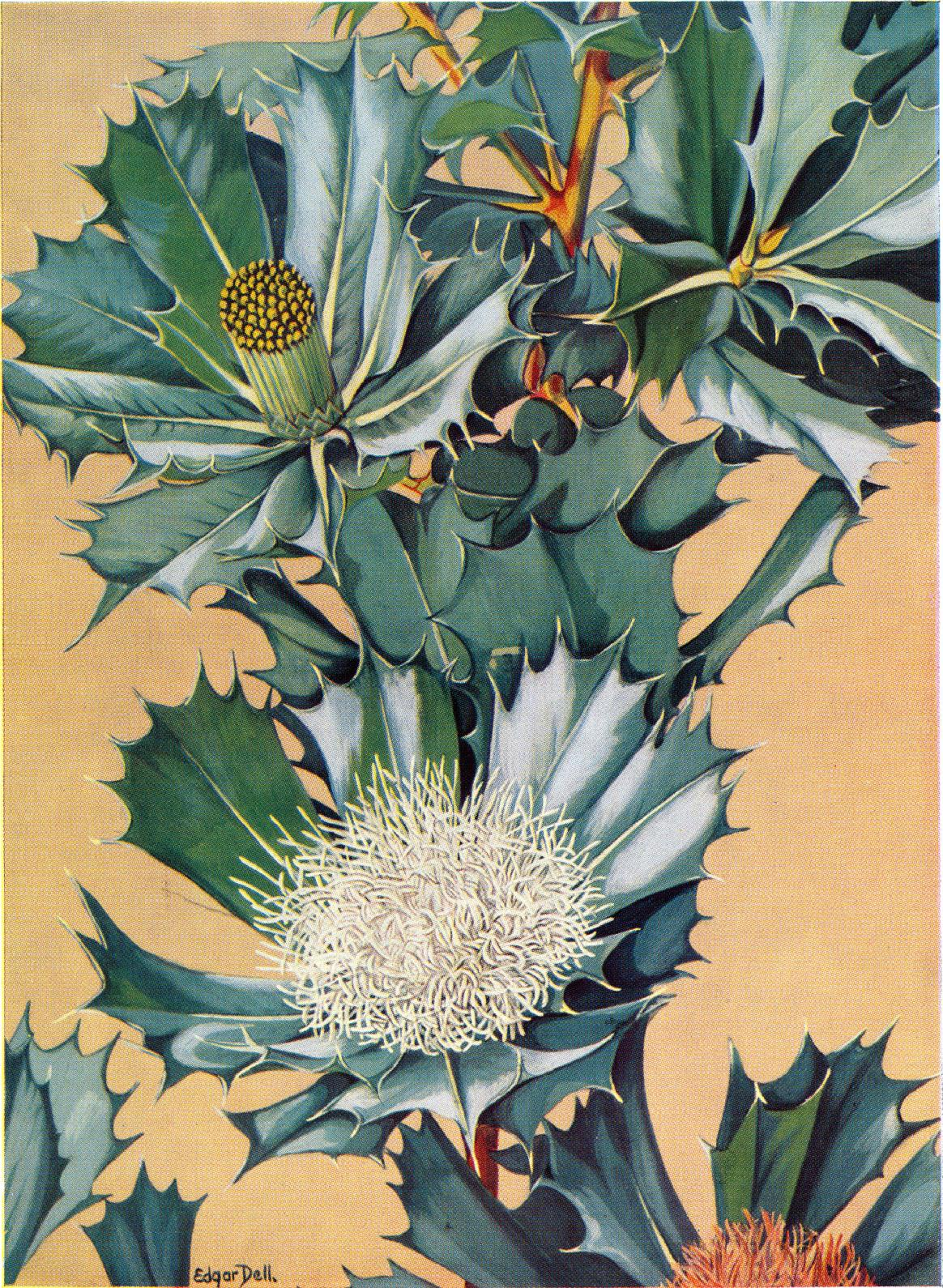
An example of Dell's art: Dryandra sessilis (now Banksia sessilis), first published in 1935.

Edgar Dell (28 November 1901 – 18 April 2008) was a Western Australian painter best known for his watercolour paintings of that state's wildflowers.

Born in London, England in 1901, where his father Edwin Dell was a Nurseryman and Garden Contractor. His maternal grandfather, Carl Rossner was a talented artist who was known for painting frescoes. At one point he painted the ballroom ceiling at Buckingham Palace. As a child, Edgar was allowed to play with leftover tubes of paint. As a young man he worked in an office in Chancery Lane before studying art at the Regent Street Polytechnic. He spent a year in Canada, working and saving money to return to art school. He attend the Hampstead Garden Suburb Art School. Again running short of money to pay for his studies, Edgar emigrated to Western Australia in 1925. He always intended to return to London and complete his studies, however times were tough when he arrived and he found regular work difficult to secure.

Edgar spent time working on an orchard in the Bickley valley of the Darling Ranges East of Perth. The area was surrounded by bushland and he worked the orchard by day and painted wildflowers from the bush by oil lamp at night. He liked to show every stage of a plant's lifecycle, with his works showing buds, open flowers and seeds. He was careful to add in minute details such as the hairs on a stem.

These paintings were sold to West Australian Newspapers Ltd., which published one painting a week in a colour supplement to The Western Mail, a weekend newspaper. These were accompanied by a botanical description by Charles Gardner, then Government Botanist, and were so popular that they were compiled into book form and published under the title Western Australian Wildflowers in 1935. A revised and enlarged edition was published in 1958, and again in the 1970s under the title Wildflowers of Western Australia. This ran to numerous editions, albeit with ever-diminishing numbers of Dell's plates as photographs of wildflowers became more readily available. On occasion, he was provided with plant specimens from the north of the state by CA Gardner and painted these at the Herbarium in Perth. Edgar sold the rights to all the original paintings of which there were over 100 and did not receive any further payment for their use.

In the early 1930s Edgar bought land in Paulls Valley in the Shire of Kalamunda, that had been the site of the Port and Honey timber mill. He intended to clear the land and establish an orchard there. The block came to be known as The Dell; this name has subsequently also been extended to a nearby recreation site. During the Great Depression he made a living cutting timber in the bush, and was away from the property for periods of time. He married Elneth O'Neil in 1935 and they raised 7 children in Paulls Valley. Their children include John Dell (https://eoas.info/biogs/P001959b.htm), Anne Dell and Bernard Dell.

Edgar lived alone on a section of the property from the early 1970s, growing flowers which he sold to florist shops in Perth. He continued this until well into his 80s and 90s. The remainder of his original property was maintained as orchard and market garden by several of his sons.

He died 18 April 2008, at the age of 106.

== See also ==
- List of Australian botanical illustrators

== Publications ==
- Dell, Edgar (1936). Flowers of Western Australia. Perth, W.A. West Australian Newspapers. 129 leaves of plates. note – cover title: Wild flowers of Western Australia.
- Dell, Edgar (1937). Poison plants of south-western Australia: from water colour drawings description by C.A. Gardner; colour plates by West Australian Newspapers. Perth, W.A.: West Australian Newspapers.
