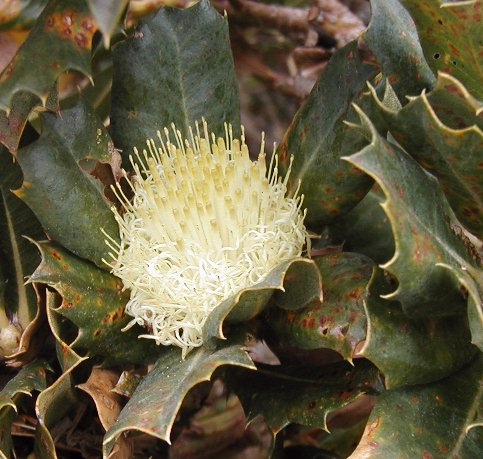

Conservation status
- Priority Four — Rare Taxa (DEC)

Scientific classification
- Kingdom: Plantae
- Clade: Embryophytes
- Clade: Tracheophytes
- Clade: Spermatophytes
- Clade: Angiosperms
- Clade: Eudicots
- Order: Proteales
- Family: Proteaceae
- Genus: Banksia
- Species: B. sessilis
- Variety: B. s. var. cordata

Trinomial name
- Banksia sessilis var. cordata (Meisn.) A.R.Mast & K.R.Thiele

Synonyms
- Dryandra sessilis var. cordata (Meisn.) A.S.George; Dryandra floribunda var. cordata Meisn. Dryandra floribunda var. major Benth. Dryandra sp. 52 (T.Applin 6537)

= Banksia sessilis var. cordata =

Species of shrub

Banksia sessilis var. cordata is a variety of Banksia sessilis (Parrot Bush), with unusually large leaves and flower heads. It is a rare variety that is restricted to the extreme south-west corner of Western Australia.

== Description ==
This variety is similar to other varieties of B. sessilis, but has larger leaves; these may be up to six centimetres long and four centimetres wide in this variety, whereas in B. sessilis var. sessilis they are commonly two to three centimetres long. The leaves of this variety are also a darker green than the other varieties, and its flower heads are generally larger.

== Taxonomy ==
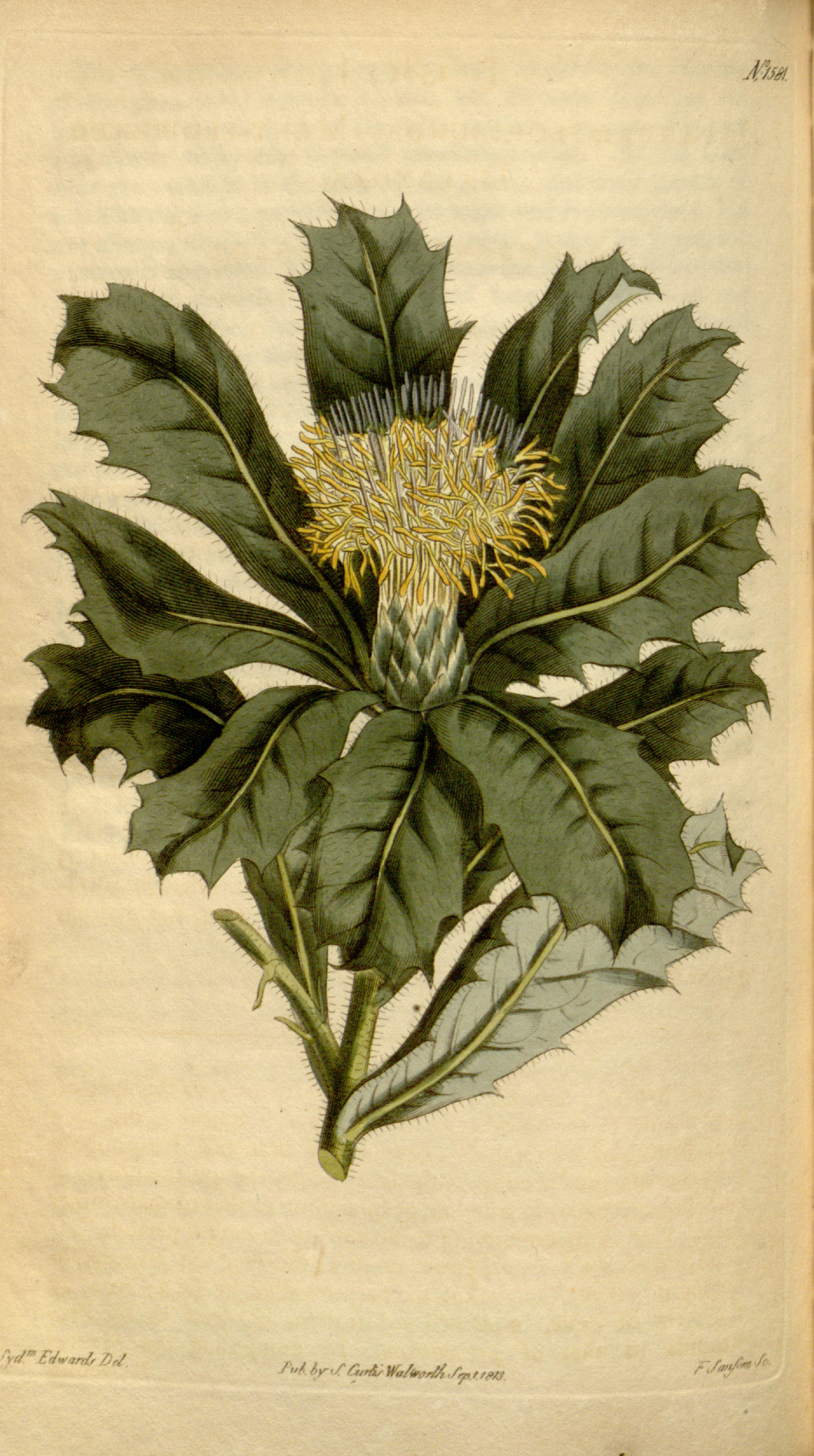
This painting of Dryandra floribunda, which appeared in Curtis's Botanical Magazine in 1813, was attributed to D. floribunda var. major (syn. B. sessilis var. cordata) by George Bentham in 1870.

This variety was first published as a variety of Dryandra floribunda (now B. sessilis) by Carl Meissner in the second volume of Plantae Preissianae, published in 1848. It was based on a type specimen collected by James Drummond; this specimen was said to have been collected at the Swan River, where this variety does not now occur. Meissner did not explicitly give an etymology for the varietal epithet, but referred to the leaves as cordatis, Latin for "heart-shaped", and this is now universally recognised as the source of the name.

In 1870, George Bentham published what is now recognised as a synonym of this variety, as D. floribunda var. major. Bentham's taxon was based on a specimen collected at Cape Naturaliste by Augustus Oldfield. He also attributed to this variety a painting of D. floribunda that appeared in Curtis's Botanical Magazine in 1813.

Dryandra floribunda having been overturned in favour of Dryandra sessilis in 1924, in 1996 Alex George transferred var. cordata from the former to the latter species. The current name changed again in 2007, when Austin Mast and Kevin Thiele transferred Dryandra into Banksia; thus the variety's current full name is Banksia sessilis var. cordata (Meisn.) A.R.Mast & K.R.Thiele.

== Distribution and habitat ==
B. sessilis var. cordata occurs only in the Warren region of the Southwest Botanical Province of Western Australia. It occurs in two disjoint areas: along the west coast between Cape Naturaliste and Cape Leeuwin; and along the south coast between Point D'Entrecasteaux and Denmark. It grows in sand over limestone, amongst coastal heath.

== Cultivation ==
This variety is little known in cultivation. It is suggested that cultivation requirements would be similar to the better-known B. sessilis var. sessilis, but that this variety would be better suited to cooler, wetter areas.

== Conservation ==
On the Department of Environment and Conservation's Declared Rare and Priority Flora List, B. sessilis var. cordata is rated "Priority 4 - Rare", meaning that it has been adequately surveyed, and does not appear to be threatened, even though it is rare.
