= Martin J. Weber =

Martin J. Weber (March 7, 1905 – June 9, 2007) was the inventor of the graphic arts technique known as posterization.

== Biography ==
He was born in 1905 in New York City. In 1962 he designed a 4-cent United States stamp commemorating Dag Hammarskjöld.
