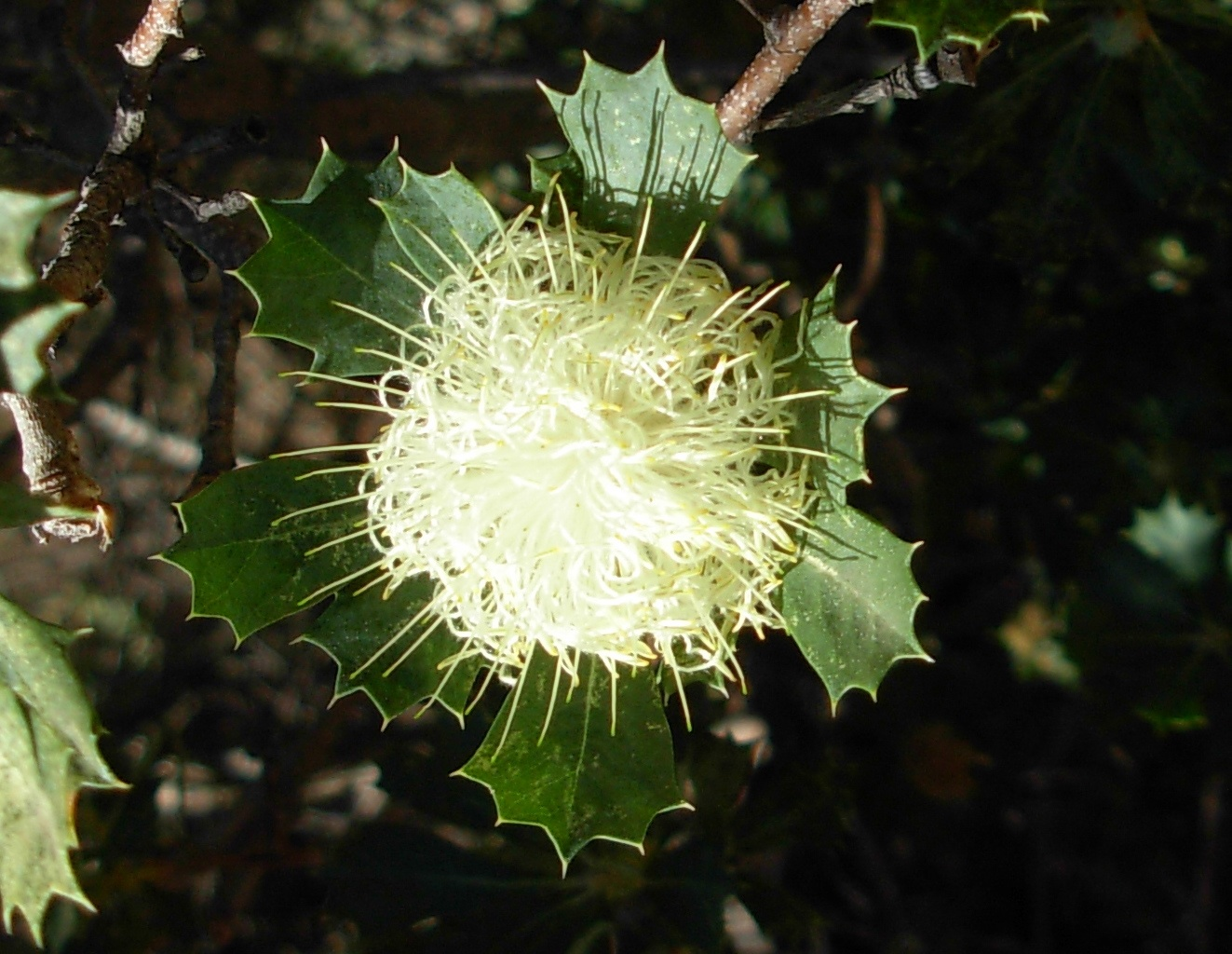

Scientific classification
- Kingdom: Plantae
- Clade: Embryophytes
- Clade: Tracheophytes
- Clade: Spermatophytes
- Clade: Angiosperms
- Clade: Eudicots
- Order: Proteales
- Family: Proteaceae
- Genus: Banksia
- Species: B. sessilis
- Variety: B. s. var. cygnorum

Trinomial name
- Banksia sessilis var. cygnorum (Gand.) A.R.Mast & K.R.Thiele

Synonyms
- Dryandra quinquedentata Gand. Dryandra cygnorum Gand. Dryandra sessilis var. cygnorum (Gand.) A.S.George

= Banksia sessilis var. cygnorum =

Variety of plant of Western Australia

Banksia sessilis var. cygnorum is a variety of Banksia sessilis (Parrot Bush).

== Description ==
It grows as a shrub up to five metres high, with a down of fine hairs on the stems. This variety has the smallest leaves of any B. sessilis variety, being no more than three centimetres long, and less than two centimetres wide. They are often wedge-shaped with a long, toothless lower margin, and as such are quite similar to those of B. sessilis var. flabellifolia, only somewhat smaller, with a concave lower margin, sometimes with small lobes at the base, and often a much darker green. As with other varieties of B. sessilis, the flowers are greenish-yellow. Each head contains from 55 to 65 flowers.

== Taxonomy ==
This variety was first published by Michel Gandoger in 1919. Gandoger actually published two names: Dryandra quinquedentata, based on specimen material collected from the Swan River by Arthur Mills Lea in 1902; and Dryandra cygnorum, based on material collected by Alexander Morrison from the Swan River in the vicinity of Melville, on 31 July 1897. In 1996, Alex George declared these two names to refer to the same plant, since Gandoger distinguished them only by the width of the leaves, the number of leaf teeth, and the length of the flower head, all of which are quite variable in this variety. He adopted the epithet cygnorum, demoting it to a variety of D. sessilis. Gandoger did not explicitly give an etymology for the epithet cygnorum, but it is assumed to be from the Latin cygnorus ("swan"), in reference to the Swan River, from whence it was first collected.

The current name of this variety arose in 2007, when Austin Mast and Kevin Thiele transferred Dryandra into Banksia; thus the variety's current full name is Banksia sessilis var. cygnorum (Gand.) A.R.Mast & K.R.Thiele.

== Distribution and habitat ==
B. sessilis var. cygnorum occurs along the coast of Western Australia from Dongara in the north, to south of Fremantle. It largely occurs near the coast, in sand over limestone; but it does occur further inland, at Kings Park and also around Lake Indoon.

== Cultivation ==
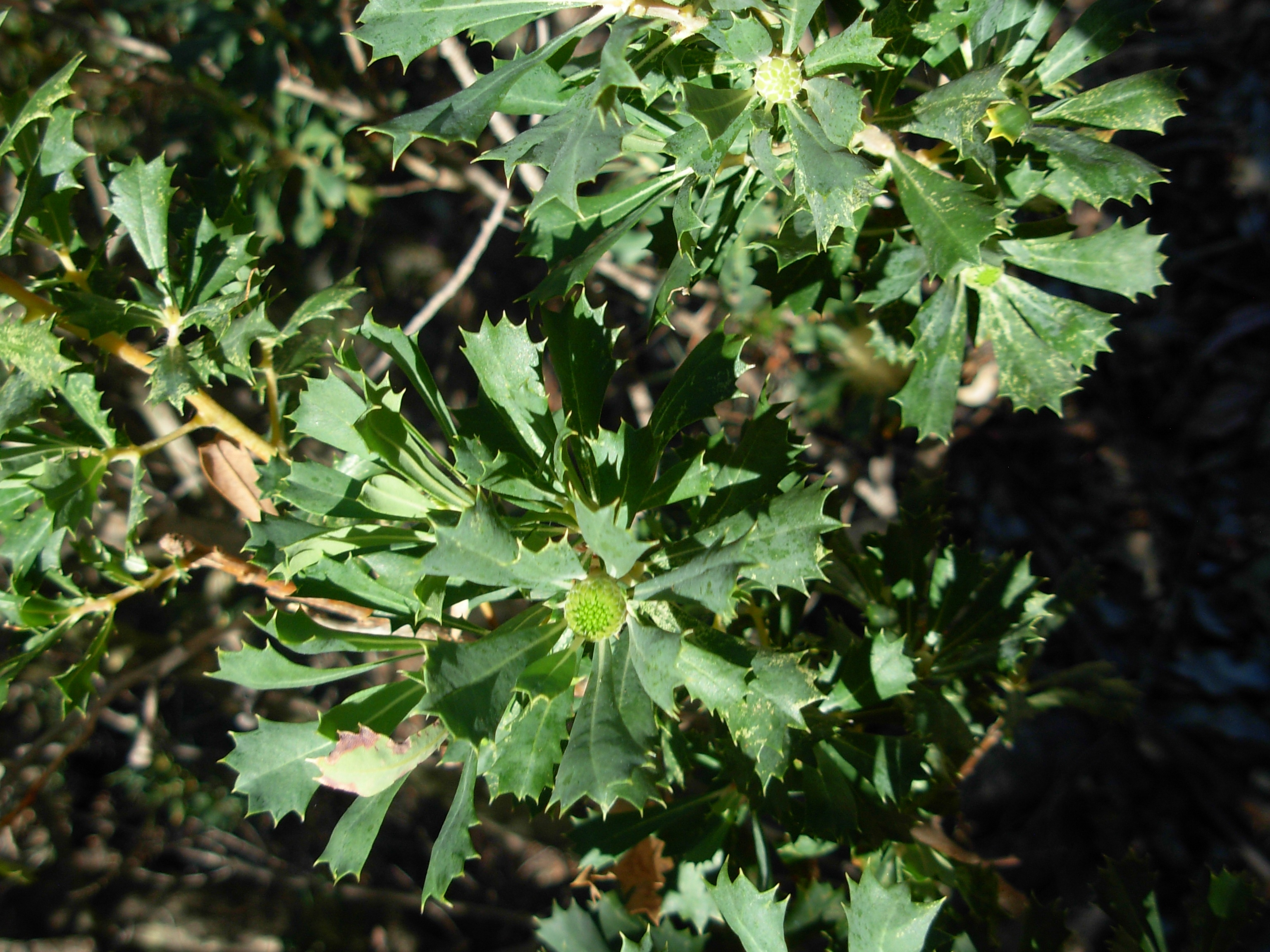
Foliage with very early buds

This variety is little known in cultivation. It is suggested that cultivation requirements would be similar to the better-known B. sessilis var. sessilis. Despite being a coastal plant, it has been reported as being frost-resistant down to −7 °C.
