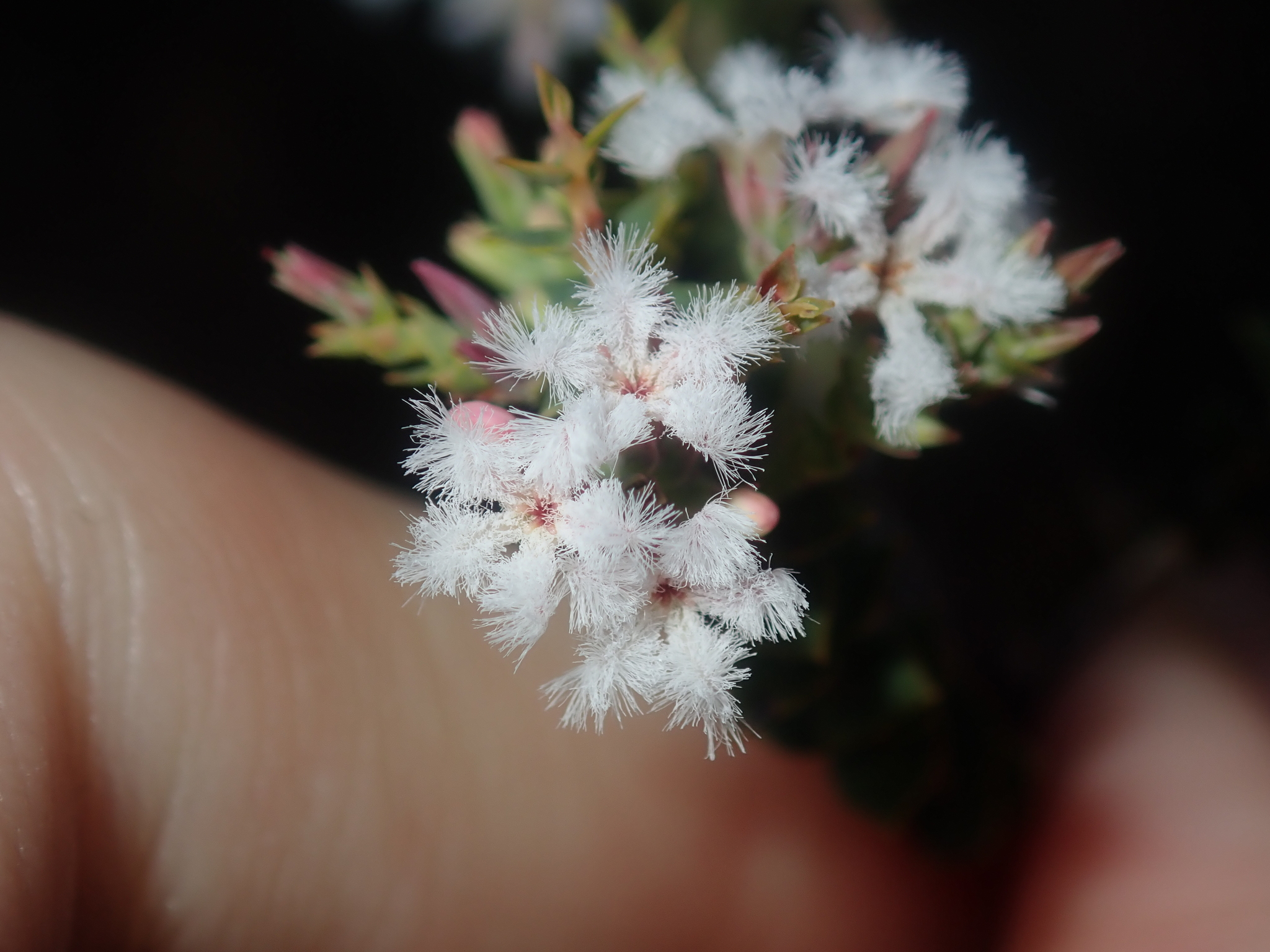
- Near Warradarge

Scientific classification
- Kingdom: Plantae
- Clade: Tracheophytes
- Clade: Angiosperms
- Clade: Eudicots
- Clade: Asterids
- Order: Ericales
- Family: Ericaceae
- Genus: Leucopogon
- Species: L. simulans

Binomial name
- Leucopogon simulans Hislop
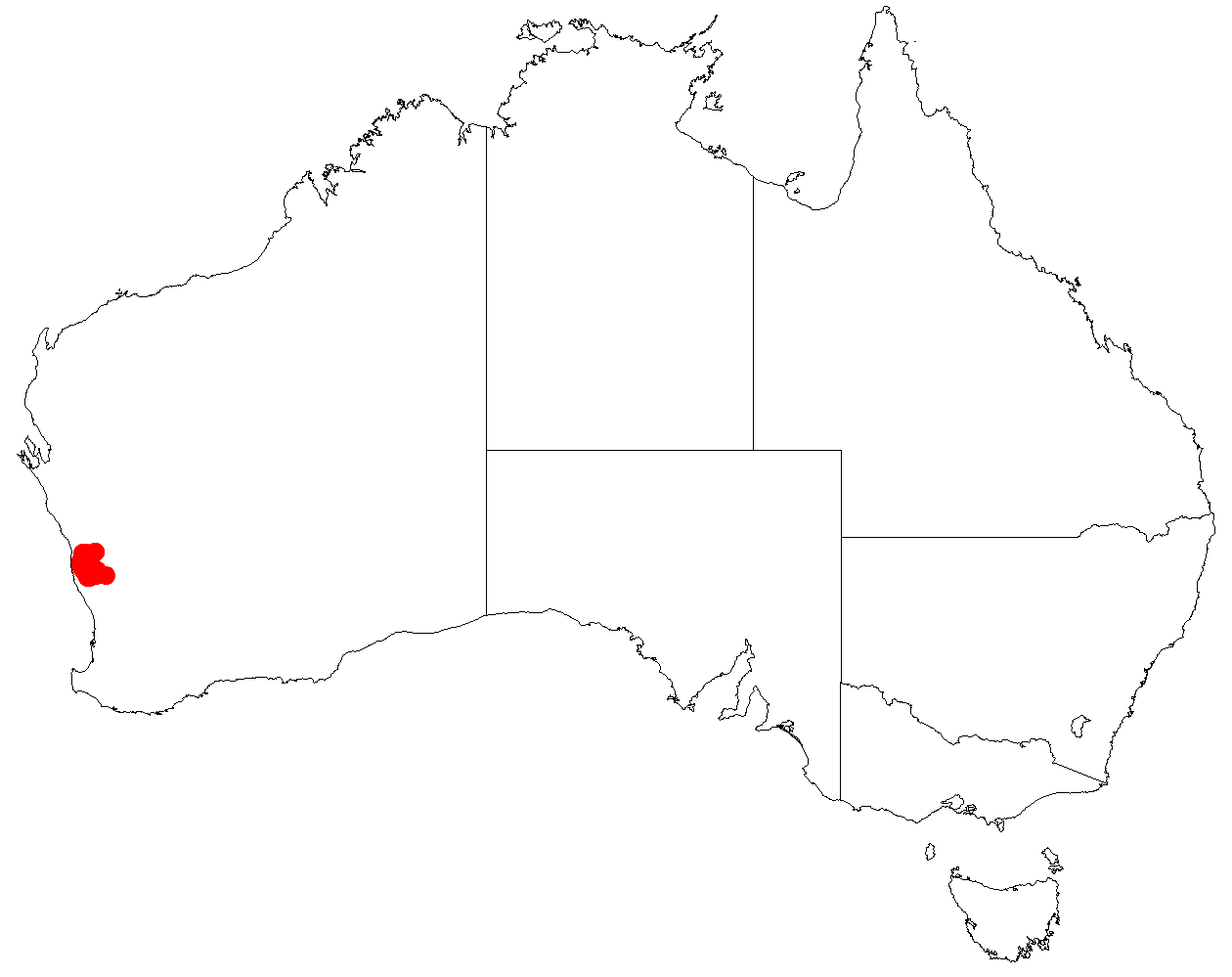
- Occurrence data from AVH

= Leucopogon simulans =

Species of plant

Leucopogon simulans is a species of flowering plant in the heath family Ericaceae and is endemic to the south-west of Western Australia. It is an erect, open shrub with a single stem at ground level, egg-shaped to elliptic leaves and erect clusters of 3 to 14 white flowers on the ends of branches and short side-branches.

== Description ==
Leucopogon simulans is an erect, open shrub that typically grows up to 80 cm (31 in) high, 70 cm (28 in) wide, and has a single stem at ground level. The leaves are spirally arranged, usually egg-shaped, 2.5–6.5 mm (0.098–0.256 in) long and 2–6 mm (0.079–0.236 in) wide on petiole up to 0.5 mm (0.020 in) long. Both surfaces of the leaves are more or less glabrous, the lower surface a slightly paler shade of green. The flowers are arranged in groups of 4 to 13 on the ends of branches or on short side-branches, with many leaf-like bracts and egg-shaped bracteoles 1.3–2.0 mm (0.051–0.079 in) long. The sepals are narrowly egg-shaped, 2.5–3.3 mm (0.098–0.130 in) long, and the petals white and joined at the base to form a bell-shaped tube 1.3–2.0 mm (0.051–0.079 in) long and shorter than the sepals, the lobes 2.2–3.0 mm (0.087–0.118 in) long and densely bearded on the inner surface. Flowering occurs in many months and the fruit is a narrowly elliptic drupe 2.5–3.0 mm (0.098–0.118 in) long.

== Taxonomy and naming ==
Leucopogon simulans was first formally described in 2016 by Michael Clyde Hislop in the journal Nuytsia from specimens he collected near South Eneabba Nature Reserve in 2010. The specific epithet (simulans) means "imitating" or "resembling", referring to the similarity of this species to L. glabellus and L. phyllostachys.

== Distribution and habitat ==
This leucopogon grows in heath and low, open woodland in sandy soil and occurs from the Arrowsmith River to Watheroo National Park in the Avon Wheatbelt, Geraldton Sandplains and Swan Coastal Plain bioregions of south-western Western Australia.

== Conservation status ==
Leucopogon simulans is listed as "not threatened" by the Western Australian Government Department of Biodiversity, Conservation and Attractions.
