= Acacia aristulata =

Watheroo wattle

Conservation status
- Endangered (EPBC Act)

Scientific classification
- Kingdom: Plantae
- Clade: Tracheophytes
- Clade: Angiosperms
- Clade: Eudicots
- Clade: Rosids
- Order: Fabales
- Family: Fabaceae
- Subfamily: Caesalpinioideae
- Clade: Mimosoid clade
- Genus: Acacia
- Species: A. aristulata

Binomial name
- Acacia aristulata Maslin
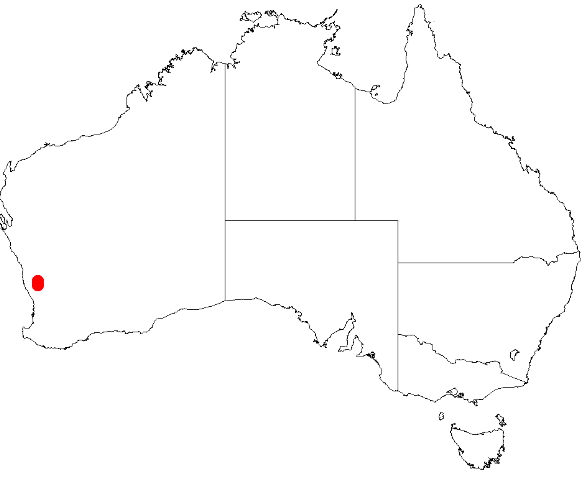
- Occurrence data from AVH

Synonyms
- Acacia aff. bidentata (B.R.Maslin 6122); Racosperma aristulatum (Maslin) Pedley

Species of legume

Acacia aristulata, also known as Watheroo wattle, is a species of flowering plant in the family Fabaceae and is endemic to a restricted area in the south-west of Western Australia. It is a shrub with narrowly oblong to wedge-shaped phyllodes, spherical heads of creamy-white flowers, and coiled to twisted pods up to 60 mm (2.4 in) long.

== Description ==
Acacia aristulata is an erect or scrambling shrub that typically grows up to 0.25–1 m (9.8 in – 3 ft 3.4 in) high and 1 m (3 ft 3 in) wide. Its branches are waxy and white. There are prominent stipules 2–3 mm (0.079–0.118 in) long at the base of the phyllodes. The phyllodes are narrowly oblong to wedge-shaped with a hooked or beak-like tip, mostly 7–10 mm (0.28–0.39 in) long and 2.0–3.5 mm (0.079–0.138 in) wide with a central midrib. The flowers are creamy-white and born in spherical heads 5–6 mm (0.20–0.24 in) in diameter, on a peduncle 10–20 mm (0.39–0.79 in) long, the heads with 13 to 17 flowers. Flowering has been recorded in September, November and December and the pods are leathery to thinly crust-like, coiled to irregularly twisted, and like a string of beads, up to 60 mm (2.4 in) long and 4–5 mm (0.16–0.20 in) wide, containing shiny brown seeds 3.5–4.0 mm (0.14–0.16 in) long.

== Taxonomy ==
Acacia aristulata was first formally described by the botanist Bruce Maslin in 1999 in the journal Nuytsia from specimens he collected 14 km (8.7 mi) north of Moora in 1986. The specific epithet (aristulata) means 'having a drawn-out point or awn' referring to the bracteoles of this species.

== Distribution and habitat ==
Watheroo wattle is restricted to low, chert hills where it grows in sand in low, open shrubland near Moora and in Watheroo National Park.

== Conservation status ==
Acacia aristulata is listed as "endangered" under the Australian Government Environment Protection and Biodiversity Conservation Act 1999 and as "threatened" under the Western Australian Government Biodiversity Conservation Act 2016.

== See also ==
- List of Acacia species
