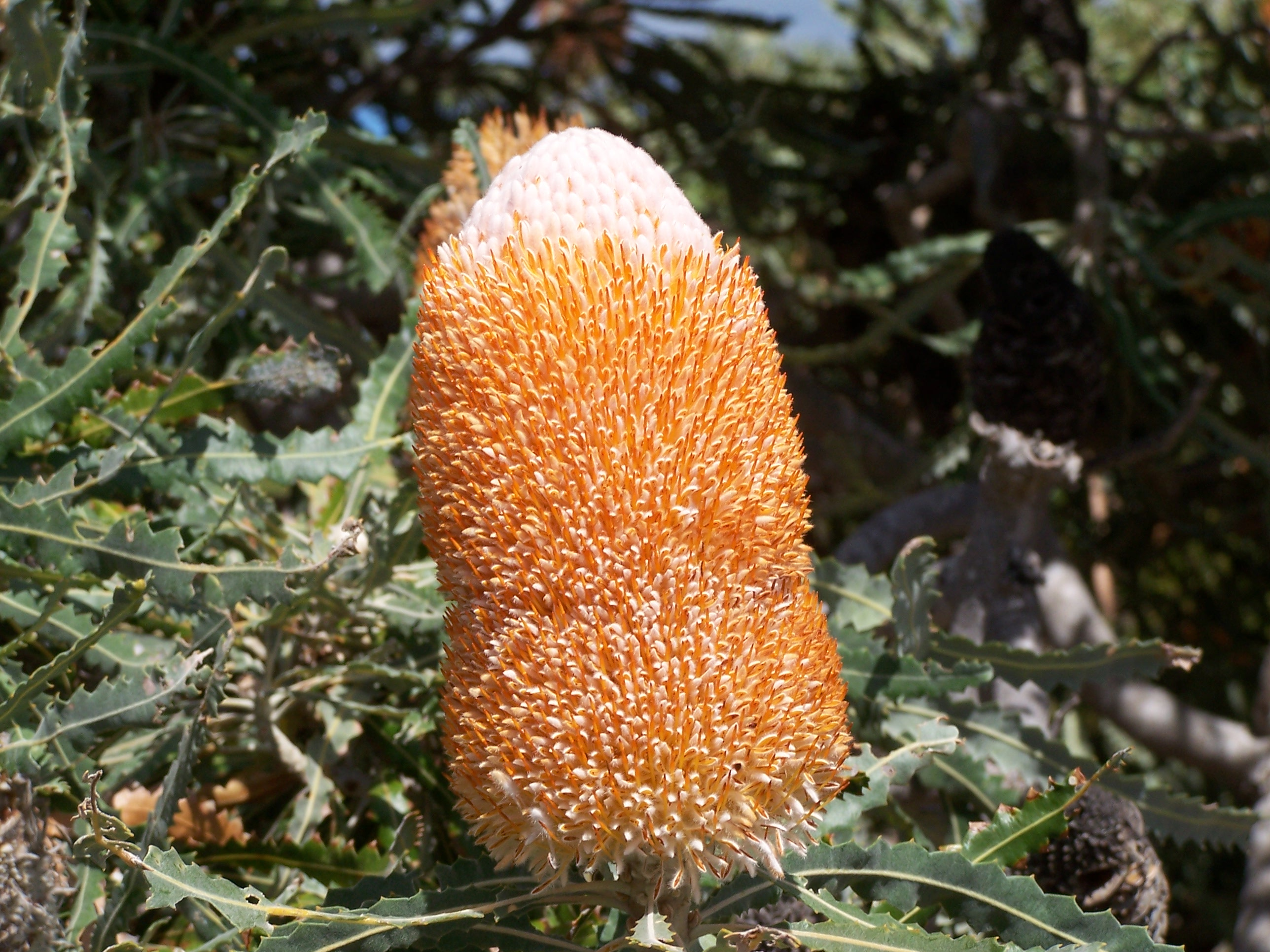

Scientific classification
- Kingdom: Plantae
- Clade: Tracheophytes
- Clade: Angiosperms
- Clade: Eudicots
- Order: Proteales
- Family: Proteaceae
- Genus: Banksia
- Species: B. prionotes

Binomial name
- Banksia prionotes Lindl.

Synonyms
- Sirmuellera prionotes (Lindl.) Kuntze

= Banksia prionotes =

Species of plant native to Western Australia

Banksia prionotes, commonly known as acorn banksia or orange banksia, is a species of shrub or tree of the genus Banksia in the family Proteaceae. It is native to the southwest of Western Australia and can reach up to 10 m (33 ft) in height. It can be much smaller in more exposed areas or in the north of its range. This species has serrated, dull green leaves and large, bright flower spikes, initially white before opening to a bright orange. Its common name arises from the partly opened inflorescence, which is shaped like an acorn. The tree is a popular garden plant and also of importance to the cut flower industry.

Banksia prionotes was first described in 1840 by English botanist John Lindley, probably from material collected by James Drummond the previous year. There are no recognised varieties, although it has been known to hybridise with Banksia hookeriana. Widely distributed in south-west Western Australia, B. prionotes is found from Shark Bay (25° S) in the north, south as far as Kojonup (33°50′S). It grows exclusively in sandy soils, and is usually the dominant plant in scrubland or low woodland. Pollinated by birds, it provides food for a wide array of vertebrate and invertebrate animals in the autumn and winter months. It is an important source of food for honeyeaters (Meliphagidae), and is critical to their survival in the Avon Wheatbelt region, where it is the only nectar-producing plant in flower at some times of the year.

== Description ==
Banksia prionotes grows as a tree up to 10 m (30 ft) high in southern parts of its distribution, but in northern parts it is usually a shorter tree or spreading shrub, reaching about 4 m (13 ft) in height; it diminishes in size as the climate becomes warmer and drier further north. It has thin, mottled grey, smooth or grooved bark, and tomentose young stems. The alternate dull green leaves are 15–27 cm (6–11 in) long, and 1–2 cm (0.4–0.8 in) wide, with toothed leaf margins made up of triangular lobes, and often a wavy surface.

Flowers occur in a typical Banksia flower spike, an inflorescence made up of hundreds of small individual flowers, or florets, densely packed around a cylindrical axis. B. prionotes has cream-coloured flowers with a bright orange limb that is not revealed until the flower fully opens. Known as anthesis, this process sweeps through the inflorescence from bottom to top over a period of days, creating the effect of a cream inflorescence that progressively turns bright orange. The old flower parts fall away after flowering finishes, revealing the axis, which may bear up to 60 embedded follicles. Oval or oblong in shape and initially covered in fine hairs, these follicles are from 14 to 20 mm (0.6 to 0.8 in) long and 6–11 mm (0.24–0.43 in) wide, and protrude 3–6 mm (0.12–0.24 in) from the cone. Inside, they bear two seeds separated by a brownish woody seed separator. The matte blackish seeds are wedge-shaped (cuneate) and measure 8–10 mm (0.3–0.4 in) long by 5–6 mm (0.20–0.24 in) wide with a membranous 'wing'.

The root system consists of a main sinker root, and up to ten lateral roots extending from a non-lignotuberous root crown. The main sinker root grows straight down to the water table; it may be up to 15 m (49 ft) long if the water table is that deep. Typically from 3 to 5 cm (1.2 to 2.0 in) in diameter immediately below the root crown, roots become gradually finer with depth, and may be less than half a centimetre (0.2 in) wide just above the water table. Upon reaching the water table, the sinker branches out into a network of very fine roots. The laterals radiate out horizontally from the base of the plant, at a depth of 3–10 cm (1.2–3.9 in). They may extend over 5 m (16 ft) from the plant, and may bear secondary laterals; larger laterals often bear auxiliary sinker roots. Lateral roots seasonally form secondary rootlets from which grow dense surface mats of proteoid roots, which function throughout the wetter months before dying off with the onset of summer.

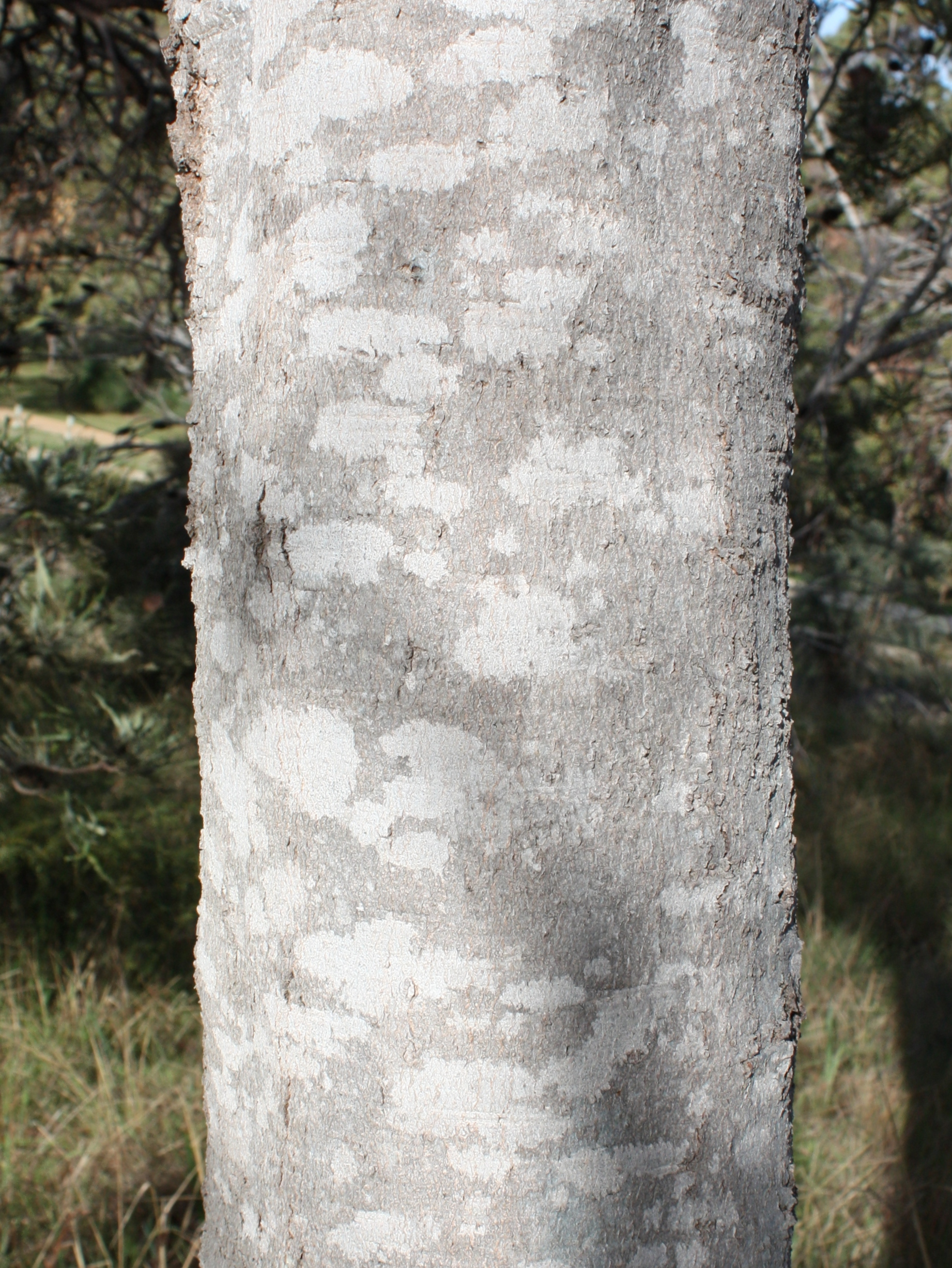
Typical smooth, mottled light grey bark

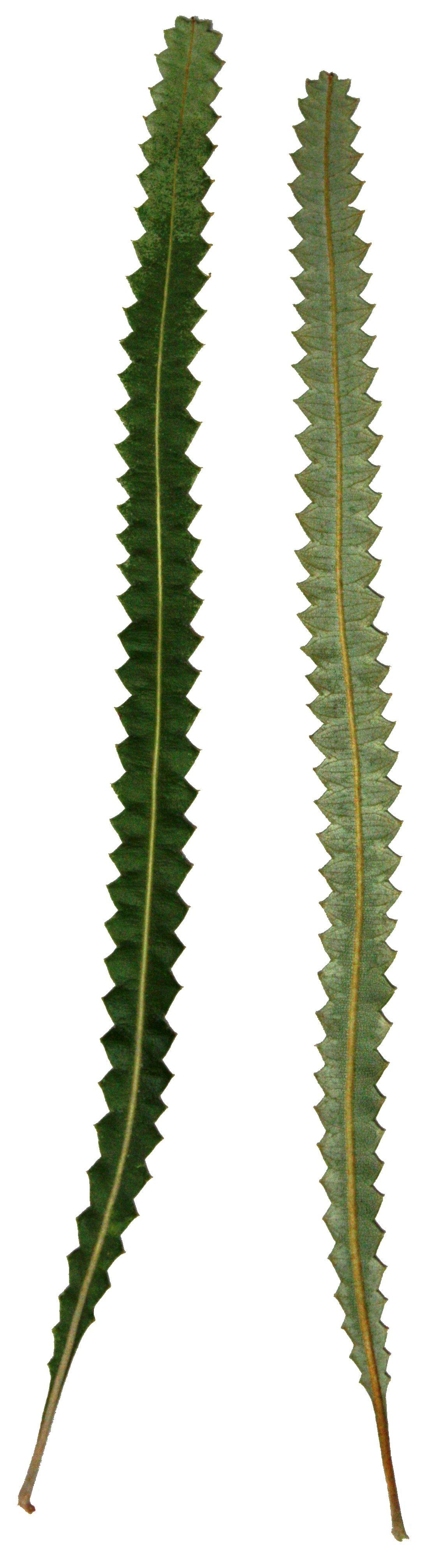
Leaves, upper (left) and lower (right) faces

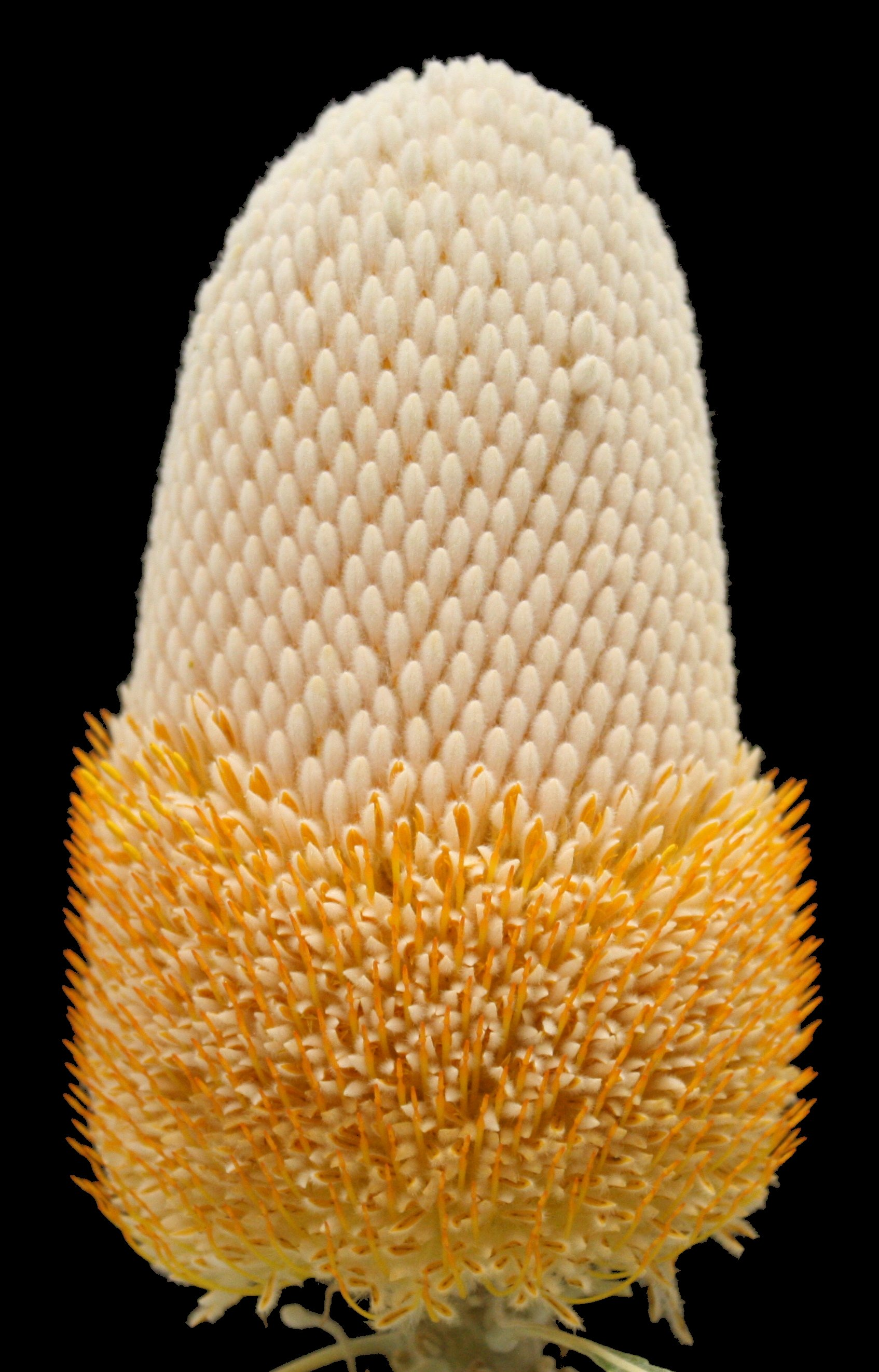
Inflorescence, mid-anthesis

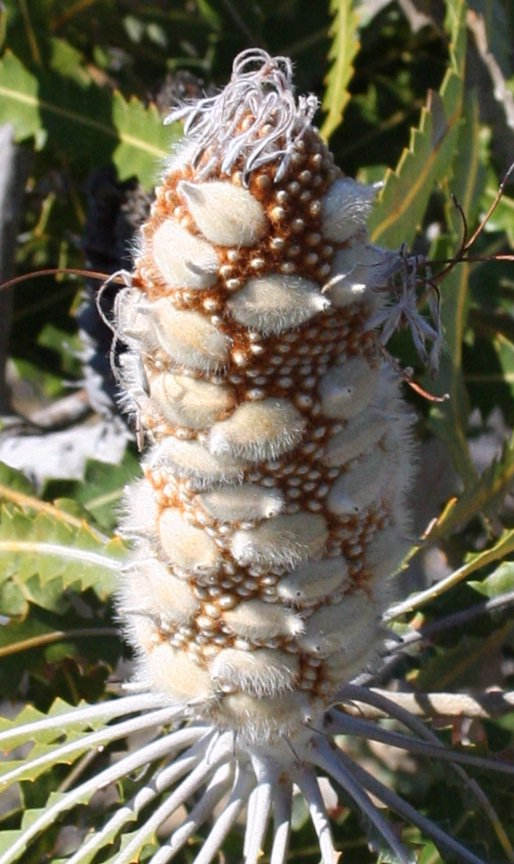
Developing infructescence

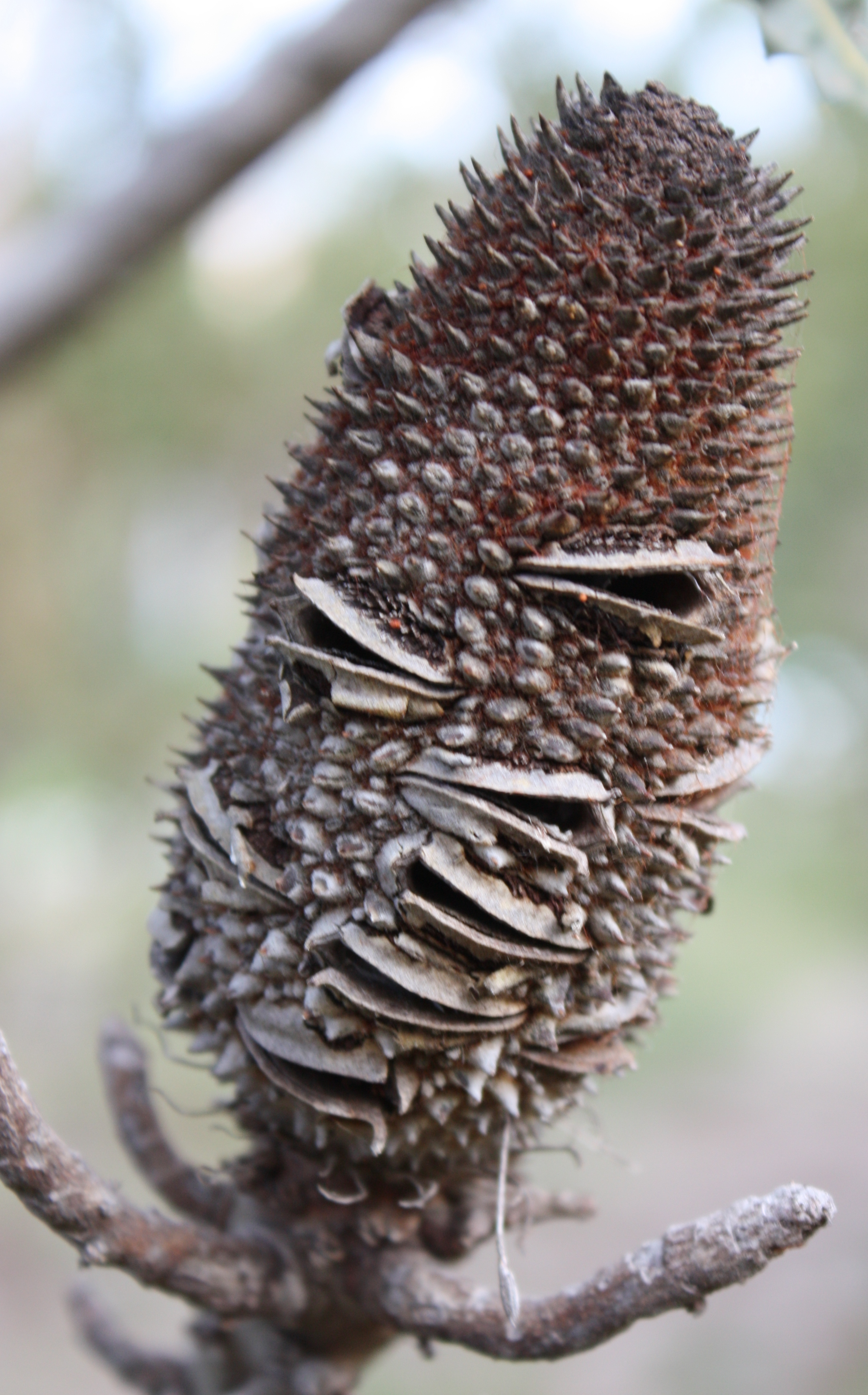
Mature infructescence after seed release

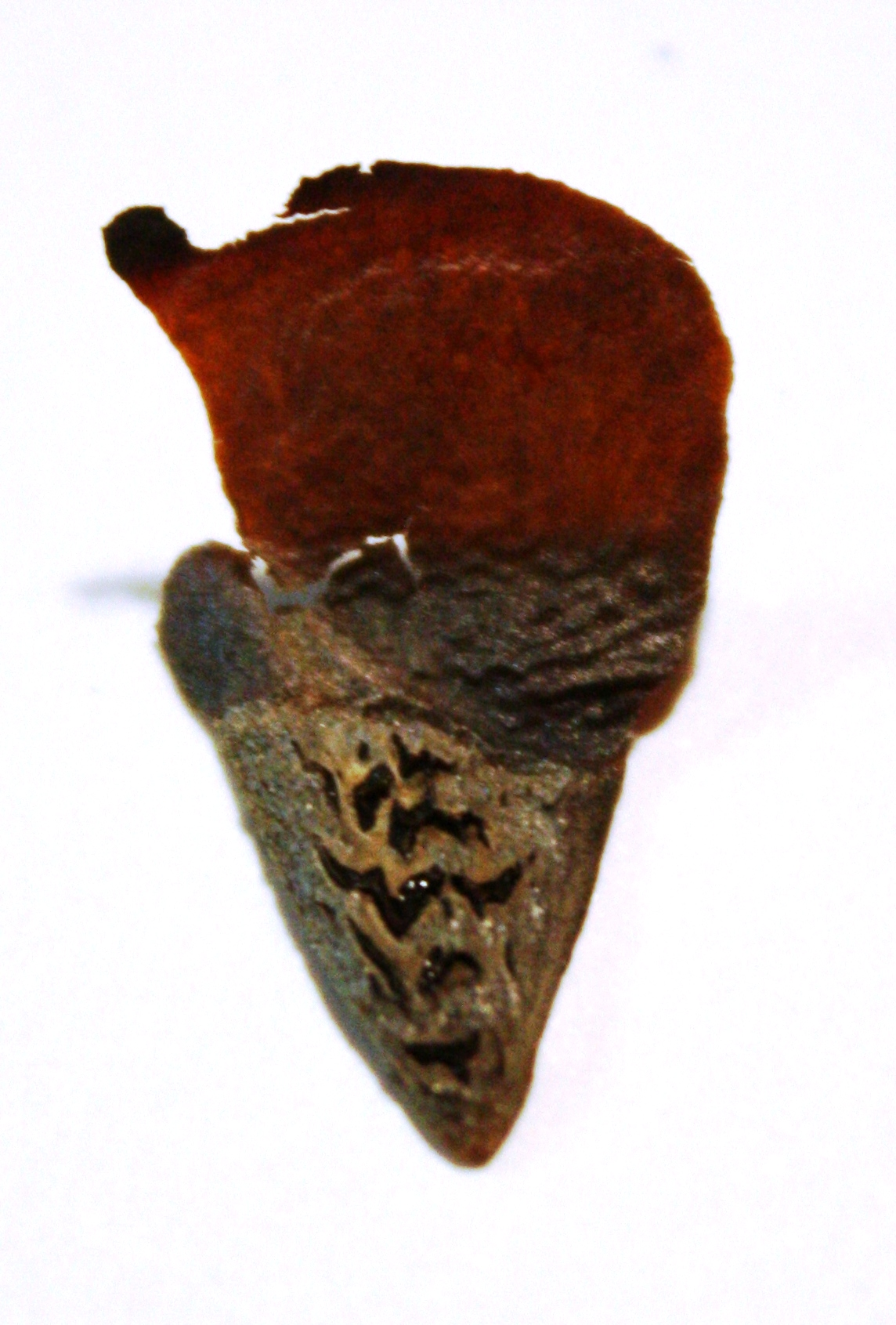
Seed

== Taxonomy ==
Banksia prionotes was first published by English botanist John Lindley in the January 1840 issue of his A Sketch of the Vegetation of the Swan River Colony; hence the species' standard author citation is Banksia prionotes Lindl. He did not specify the type material upon which he based the species, but A Sketch of the Vegetation of the Swan River Colony is based primarily upon the collections of early settler and botanist James Drummond. A sheet of mounted specimens at the University of Cambridge Herbarium (CGE), labelled "Swan River, Drummond, 1839" and annotated "Banksia prionotes m" in Lindley's hand, has since been designated the lectotype. Lindley also made no mention of the etymology of the specific epithet prionotes, but it is assumed to be derived from the Ancient Greek prion ('saw') and -otes ('quality'), referring to the serrated leaf margins.

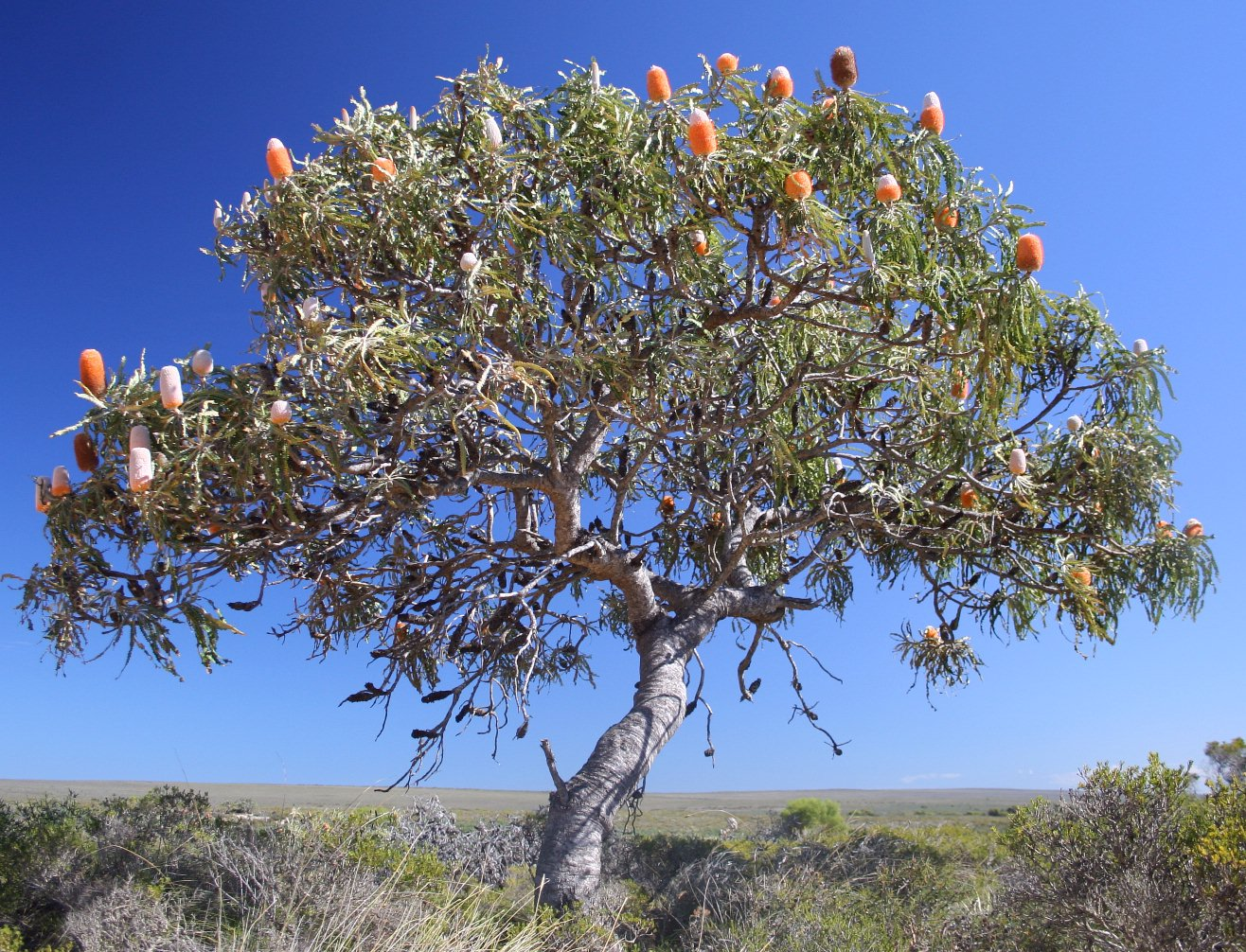
A more gnarled shorter tree or shrub is typical in the north of the range.

The most frequently reported common names of B. prionotes are acorn banksia, derived from the resemblance of partly opened inflorescences to acorns; and orange banksia. Other reported common names include saw-toothed banksia and golden banksia Bwongka is a generic Noongar name for Banksia in the Avon River catchment, where B. prionotes is one of several species occurring.

No further subspecies or varieties of B. prionotes have been described, and it has no taxonomic synonyms. Its only nomenclatural synonym is Sirmuellera prionotes (Lindl.) Kuntze, which arose from Otto Kuntze's unsuccessful 1891 attempt to transfer Banksia into the new name Sirmuellera. When Carl Meissner published his infrageneric arrangement of Banksia in 1856, he placed B. prionotes in section Eubanksia because its inflorescence is a spike rather than a domed head, and in series Salicinae, a large series that is now considered quite heterogeneous. This series was discarded in the 1870 arrangement of George Bentham; instead, B. prionotes was placed in section Orthostylis, which Bentham defined as consisting of those Banksia species with flat leaves with serrated margins, and rigid, erect styles that "give the cones after the flowers have opened a different aspect". In 1981, Alex George published a revised arrangement that placed B. prionotes in the subgenus Banksia because of its flower spike, section Banksia because its styles are straight rather than hooked, and the series Crocinae, a new series of four closely related species, all with bright orange perianths and pistils.

George's arrangement remained current until 1996, when Kevin Thiele and Pauline Ladiges published an arrangement informed by a cladistic analysis of morphological characteristics. Their arrangement maintained B. prionotes in B. subg. Banksia, but discarded George's sections and his series Crocinae. Instead, B. prionotes was placed at the end of series Banksia, in subseries Cratistylis. Questioning the emphasis on cladistics in Thiele and Ladiges' arrangement, George published a slightly modified version of his 1981 arrangement in his 1999 treatment of Banksia for the Flora of Australia series of monographs. To date, this remains the most recent comprehensive arrangement. The placement of B. prionotes in George's 1999 arrangement may be summarised as follows:

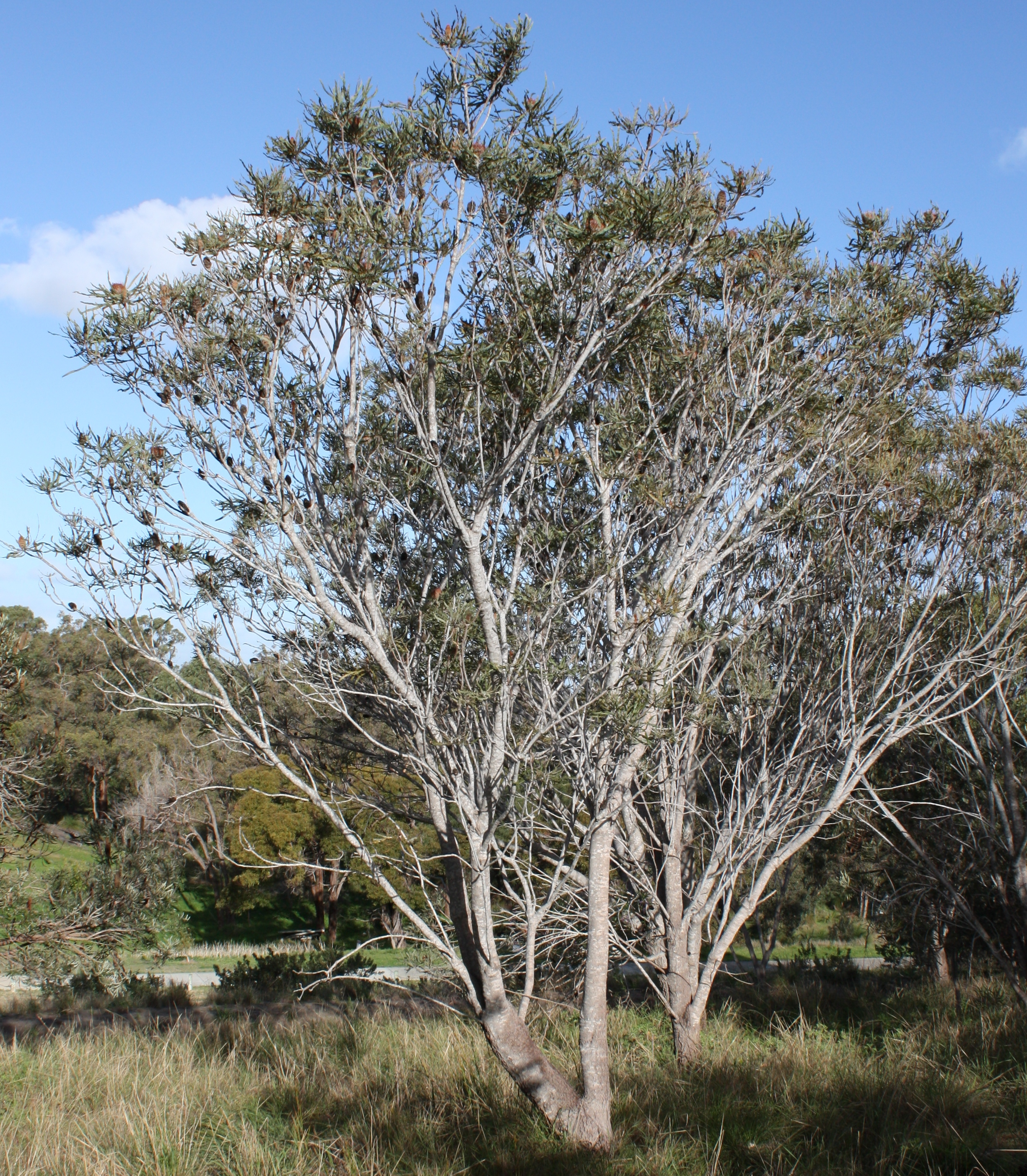
A taller, more upright habit, with an open canopy, is typical in the south of the range

Banksia

B. subg. Banksia

B. sect. Banksia

B. ser. Salicinae (11 species, 7 subspecies)
B. ser. Grandes (2 species)
B. ser. Banksia (8 species)
B. ser. Crocinae

B. prionotes
B. burdettii
B. hookeriana
B. victoriae

B. ser. Prostratae (6 species, 3 varieties)
B. ser. Cyrtostylis (13 species)
B. ser. Tetragonae (3 species)
B. ser. Bauerinae (1 species)
B. ser. Quercinae (2 species)

B. sect. Coccinea (1 species)
B. sect. Oncostylis (4 series, 22 species, 4 subspecies, 11 varieties)

B. subg. Isostylis (3 species)

Since 1998, American botanist Austin Mast has been publishing results of ongoing cladistic analyses of DNA sequence data for the subtribe Banksiinae, which includes Banksia. With respect to B. prionotes, Mast's results are fairly consistent with those of both George and Thiele and Ladiges. Series Crocinae appears to be monophyletic, and B. hookeriana is confirmed as B. prionotes' closest relative. Overall, however, the inferred phylogeny is very different from George's arrangement. Early in 2007, Mast and Thiele initiated a rearrangement of Banksiinae by publishing several new names, including subgenus Spathulatae for the species of Banksia that have spoon-shaped cotyledons; in this way they also redefined the autonym B. subgenus Banksia. They have not yet published a full arrangement, but if their nomenclatural changes are taken as an interim arrangement, then B. prionotes is placed in subgenus Banksia.

=== Hybrids ===
==== With Banksia hookeriana ====
Banksia prionotes readily hybridises with Banksia hookeriana (Hooker's banksia) under experimental conditions, indicating that these species have highly compatible pollen. The cultivar B. 'Waite Orange' is believed to be such a hybrid, having arisen by open pollination during a breeding experiment conducted at the Waite Agricultural Research Institute of the University of Adelaide in 1988.

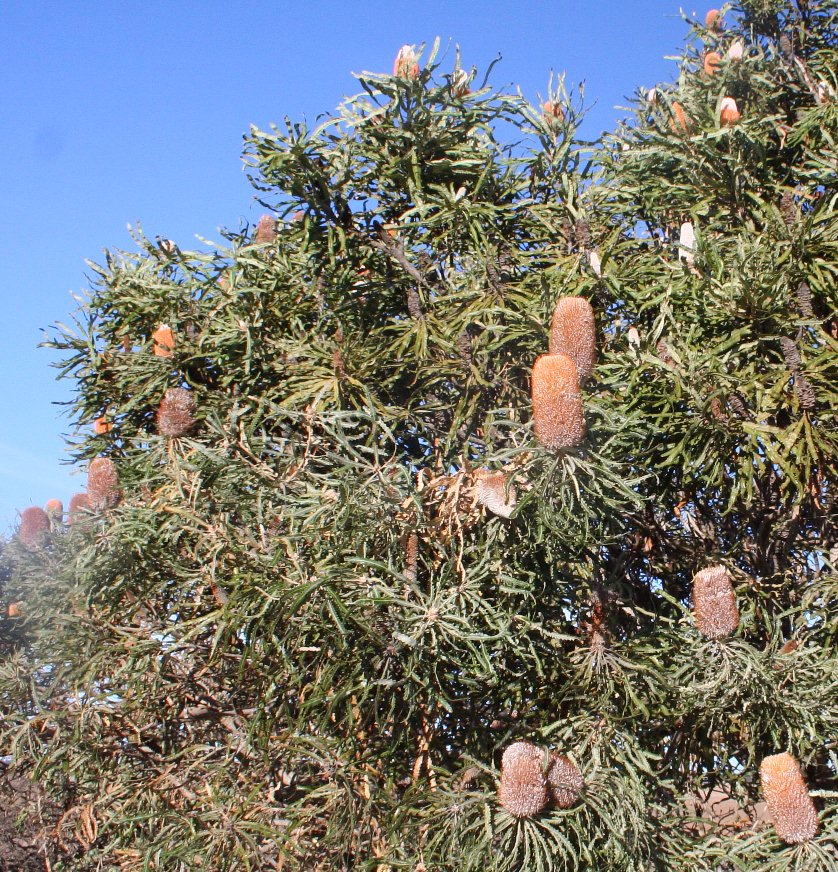
A hybrid, B. prionotes × hookeriana, growing on a roadside near Walkaway. The large size, consistent with B. prionotes, together with the narrow leaves of B. hookeriana, are diagnostic.

Banksia prionotes × hookeriana has also been verified as occurring in the wild, but only in disturbed locations. The two parent species have overlapping ranges and are pollinated by the same honeyeater species; and though preferring different soils, they often occur near enough to each other for pollinators to move between them. It therefore appears that the only barrier to hybridisation in undisturbed areas is the different flowering seasons: B. prionotes has usually finished flowering by the end of May, whereas flowering of B. hookeriana usually does not begin until June. In disturbed areas, however, the increased runoff and reduced competition mean extra nutrients are available, and this results in larger plants with more flowers and a longer flowering season. Thus the flowering seasons overlap, and the sole barrier to interbreeding is removed. The resultant F1 hybrids are fully fertile, with seed production rates similar to that of the parent species. There is no barrier to backcrossing of hybrids with parent species, and in some populations this has resulted in hybrid swarms. This raises the possibility of the parent species gradually losing their genetic integrity, especially if the intermediate characteristics of the hybrid offer it a competitive advantage over the parent species, such as a wider habitat tolerance. Moreover, speciation might occur if the hybrid's intermediate characteristics allow it to occupy a habitat unsuited to both parents, such as an intermediate soil type.

Banksia prionotes × hookeriana hybrids have characteristics intermediate between the two parents. For example, the first putative hybrids studied had a habit "like that of gigantic B. hookerana [sic]", having inherited the size of B. prionotes, together with B. hookeriana's tendency to branch from near the base of the trunk. Similarly, the infructescences were like B. prionotes in size, but had persistent flowers like B. hookeriana. Inflorescences and leaves were intermediate in size and shape, and bark was like that of B. prionotes.

==== Other putative hybrids ====
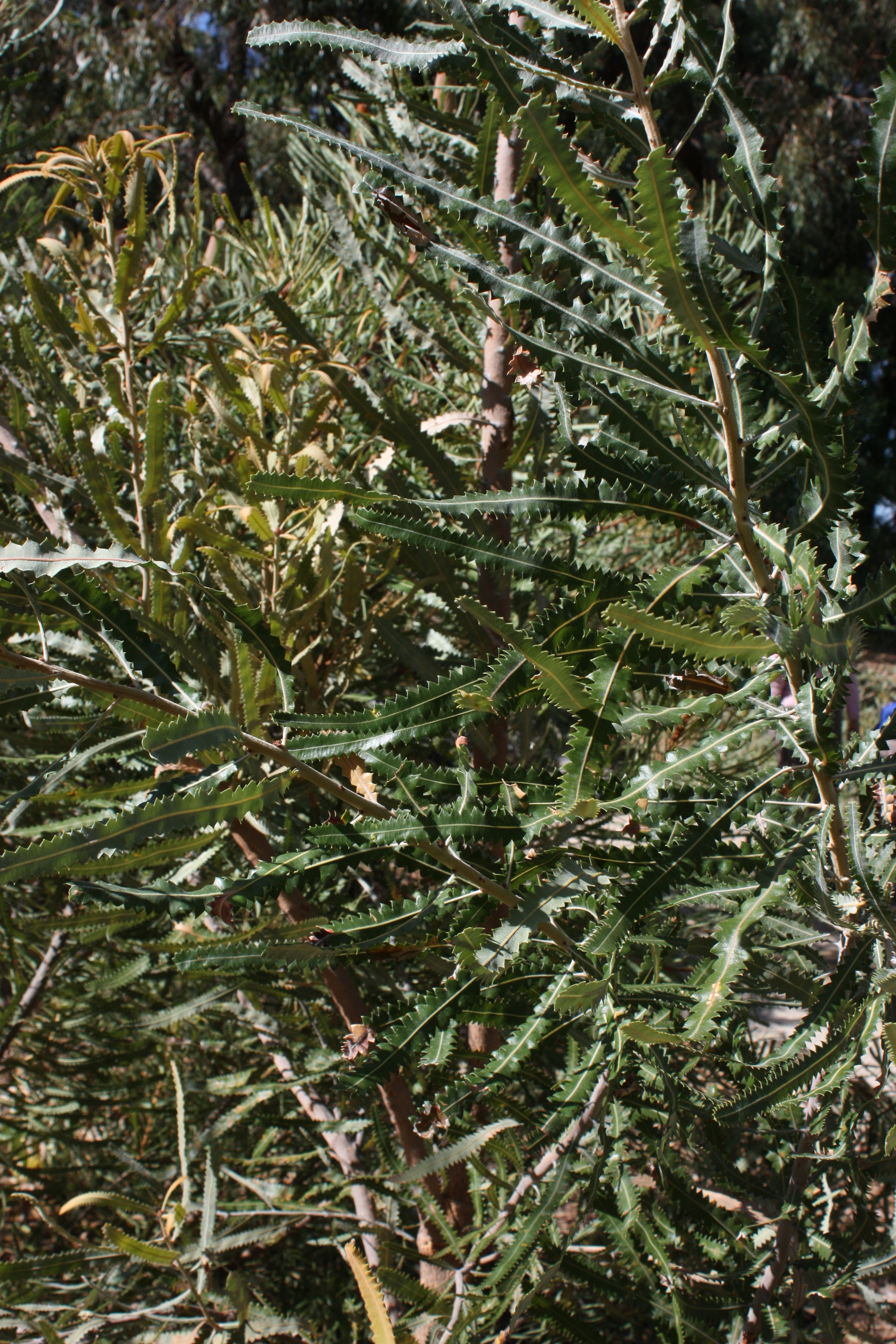
Foliage of B. menziesii × prionotes, in cultivation, Kings Park, Perth, Western Australia

During data collection for The Banksia Atlas project, a single presumed natural hybrid between B. prionotes and B. lindleyana (porcupine banksia), with fruit like B. lindleyana but leaves intermediate between the two parents, was found north of Kalbarri National Park. At the time this was considered an important discovery, as the parent species were thought not to be closely related. Mast's analyses, however, place them both in a clade of eight species, though B. lindleyana remains less closely related to B. prionotes than B. hookeriana. Hybrids of B. prionotes with B. menziesii (firewood banksia) have also been produced by artificial means, and presumed natural hybrids have been recorded.

== Distribution and habitat ==
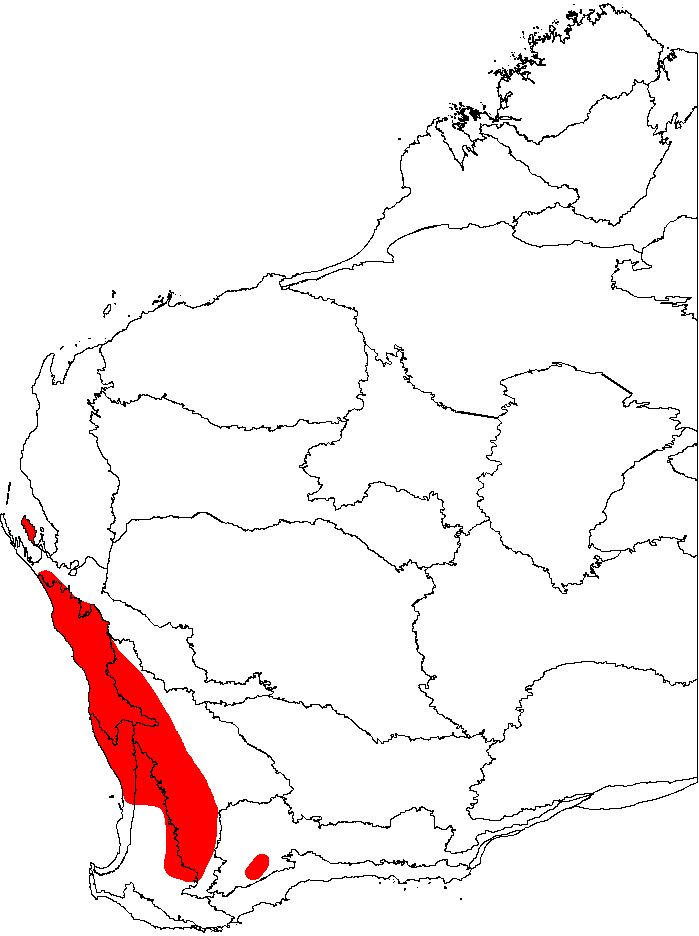
Distribution

Banksia prionotes occurs throughout much of the Southwest Botanical Province, occurring both along the west coast and well inland, and ranging from Shark Bay (25°30′S) in the north, to Kojonup (33°50'S) and Jerramungup (34°24'S 118°55'E) in the south and south-east respectively. It grows among tall shrubland or low woodland, mostly in the swales and lower slopes of dunes, and shows a very strong preference for deep white or yellow sand.

It is most common amongst the kwongan heath of the Geraldton Sandplains north of Jurien; it has a fairly continuous distribution there, often as the dominant species, and extends inland to around the 350 mm isohyet. On the Swan Coastal Plain to the south, its distribution is discontinuous, being largely confined to patches of suitable sand in the narrow transition zone where tuart forest gives way to jarrah forest. With the exception of a population at Point Walter (32°00′S), it does not occur on the sandplain south of the Swan River.

The soils east of the Darling Scarp are generally too heavy for this species, with the exception of some isolated pockets of deep alluvial or aeolian yellow sand. B. prionotes thus has a very patchy distribution east of the scarp. This area nonetheless accounts for around half of its geographic range, with the species extending well to the south and south-east of the scarp. In total, the species occurs over a north–south distance of about 815 km (500 mi), and an east–west distance of about 125 km (80 mi).

The species is almost totally restricted to the swales and lower slopes of dunes. Various reasons for this have been proposed; on the one hand, it has been argued that its dependence on ground water necessitates that it grow only where ground water is relatively near the surface; on the other hand, it has been suggested that it cannot survive in higher parts of the landscape because fires are too frequent there. The latter hypothesis is supported by the recent expansion of B. prionotes along road verges of the Brand Highway, where fires are relatively rare. Despite B. prionotes' occurrence in lower parts of the landscape, it does not occur in areas prone to flooding, because of its intolerance of heavy soils, and because extended periods of flooding kill seedlings. However, recent falls of the water table on the Swan Coastal Plain have seen B. prionotes replace the more water-loving Banksia littoralis in some areas that were previously flood-prone.

== Ecology and physiology ==
=== Growth ===
The structure of the root system, comprising a vertical tap root and multiple horizontal laterals, develops in the seedling's first year. Thereafter, the sinker and laterals continue to lengthen, and new laterals appear. There are only three to five laterals at first, but this number typically increases to eight to ten within ten years. During the first winter, there is a great deal of root system development, especially elongation of the sinker root, but almost no shoot growth. By summer, the sinker root has generally almost reached the water table, and shoot growth increases substantially. Around February, the shoot forms a resting bud, and growth then ceases until October. On resumption of shoot growth, the shoots grow rapidly for a short time, while the plant is under little water stress; then, with the onset of water stress, the plant settles into a long period of slower shoot growth. This pattern of summer-only shoot growth is maintained throughout the life of the plant, except that in mature plants, seasonal shoot growth may cease with the formation of a terminal inflorescence rather than a resting bud. Inflorescence development continues after shoot growth ceases, and flowering commences in February or March. March and April are the peak months for flowering, which ends in July or August.

Annual growth increases exponentially for the first eight years or so, but then slows down as resources are diverted into reproduction and the greater density of foliage results in reduced photosynthetic efficiency.

=== Nutrition and metabolism ===
The root structure of B. prionotes exhibits two common environmental adaptations. Firstly, this species is phreatophytic, that is, its long taproot extends down to the water table, securing it a continuous water supply through the dry summer months, when surface water is generally unavailable. This not only helps ensure survival over summer, but allows plants to grow then. Though the supply of water is the taproot's primary function, the ground water obtained typically contains ionic concentrations of chloride, sodium, magnesium, calcium and potassium that are adequate for the plant's nutritional needs.

The other common adaptation is the possession of cluster roots, which allow it to extract enough nutrients to survive in the oligotrophic soils in which it grows. With the onset of autumn rains, the lateral roots form dense surface mats of cluster roots in the top 20 cm (8 in) of soil, just below the leaf litter, where most minerals are concentrated. These roots exude chemicals that enhance mineral solubility, greatly increasing the availability and uptake of nutrients in impoverished soils such as the phosphorus-deficient native soils of Australia. For as long as surface water is available, they take in water and a range of minerals. In B. prionotes they are principally responsible for the uptake of malate, phosphate, chloride, sodium and potassium. When soils are high in nitrates, they may also perform some nitrate reductase activities, primarily the conversion of ammonium into amino acids, such as asparagine and glutamine.

The uptake of nutrient and water by the cluster roots peaks through winter and spring, but ceases when the upper layer of soil dries out in summer. The cluster roots are then allowed to die, but the laterals are protected from desiccation by a continuous supply of water from the sinker root. The water supplied to the laterals by the sinker root is continually lost to the soil; thus this plant facilitates the movement of ground water from the water table into surface soil, a process known as hydraulic redistribution. Cluster roots have been estimated as composing about 30% of total root biomass in this species; the seasonal production of so much biomass, only for it to be lost at the end of the growing season, represents a substantial investment by the plant, but one that is critical in the competition for nutrients.

During winter, asparagine is metabolised immediately, but other nutrients, especially phosphates and glutamine, are removed from the xylem sap and stored in mature stem, bark and leaf tissues for release back into the xylem just before shoot growth begins in mid- summer. This is also the time when the oldest leaves senesce and die, returning nutrients to the plant at the time when they are needed most. When glutamine eventually reaches the leaves, it is broken down and used to synthesise protein and non-amide amino acids, such as aspartate, threonine, serine, glutamate, glycine, alanine and cystine. Together with sucrose and other solutes, these are then circulated in the phloem. The phloem sap of B. prionotes is unusual in having an extremely low ratio of potassium to sodium cations, and very low concentrations of phosphate and amino acids compared to chloride and sulfate anions. The low levels of potassium and phosphate reflect the extremely low availability of these minerals in the soil. The unusually high levels of sodium and chloride—at concentrations usually only seen under saline conditions—may be due to the necessity of maintaining turgor pressure; that is, with so little potassium and phosphate available, and that needed in the building of new tissue, B. prionotes is forced to circulate whatever other ions are available in order to maintain turgor.

=== Breeding system ===
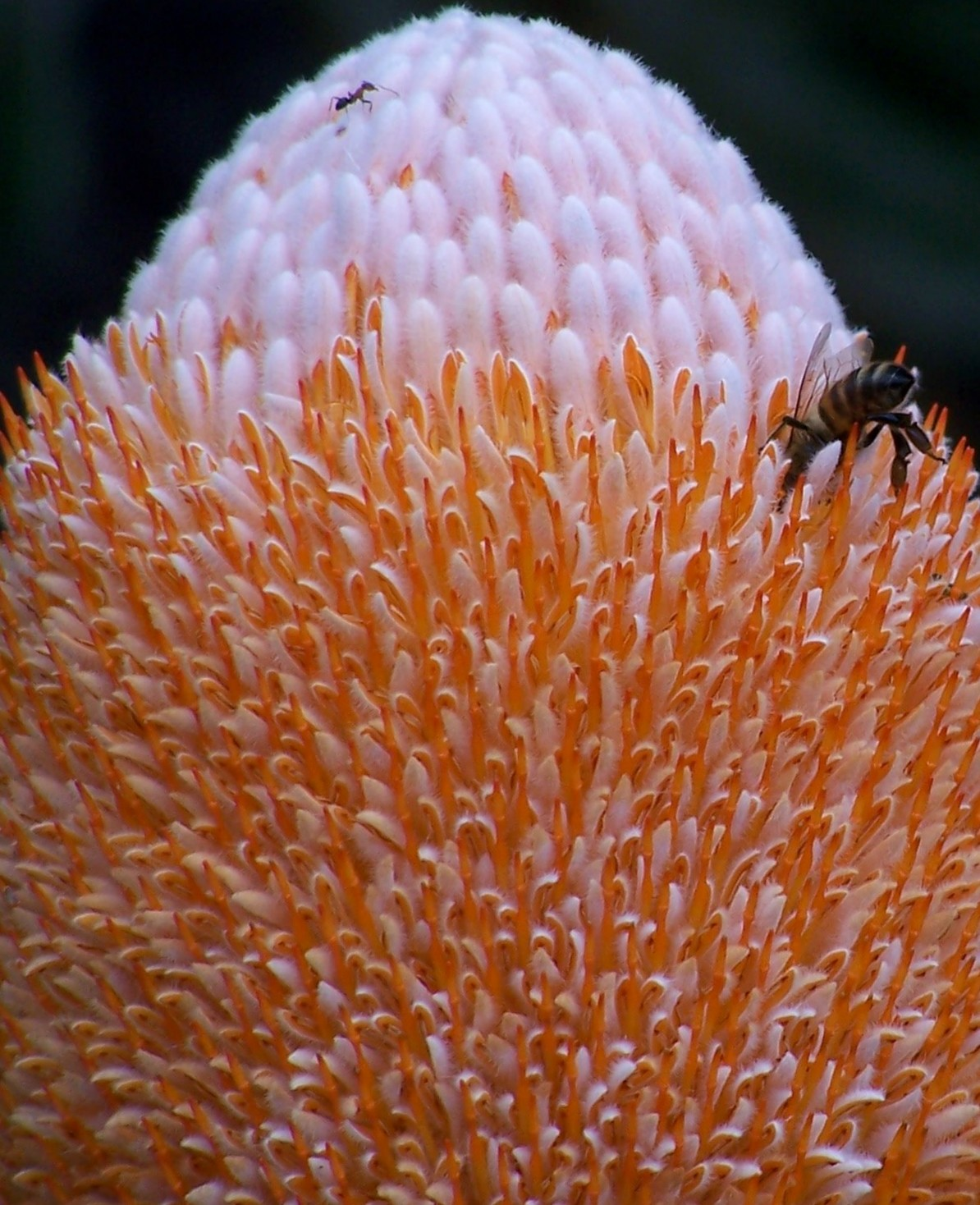
Close-up of inflorescence, with a European honey bee feeding at the plane of anthesis. Insects are apparently ineffective pollinators.

Flowering begins in February and is usually finished by the end of June. The species has an unusually low rate of flowering: even at the peak of its flowering season, it averages less than seven inflorescences per plant flowering at any one time. Individual flowers open sequentially from bottom to top within each inflorescence, the rate varying with the time of day: more flowers open during the day than at night, with a peak rate of around two to three florets per hour during the first few hours of daylight, when honeyeater foraging is also at its peak.

The flowers provide food for a range of nectarivorous birds: mainly honeyeaters, including the New Holland honeyeater (Phylidonyris novaehollandiae), white-cheeked honeyeater (P. niger), brown honeyeater (Lichmera indistincta), singing honeyeater (Gavicalis virescens), tawny-crowned honeyeater (Gliciphila melanops) and red wattlebird (Anthochaera carunculata). Lorikeets have also been observed feeding at the flowers, as have insects, including ants, bees, and aphids. Of these, evidence suggests that only birds are effective pollinators. Insects apparently play no role in pollination, since inflorescences do not form follicles when birds are excluded in pollinator exclusion experiments; and pollination by mammals has never been recorded in this species.

Honeyeaters prefer to forage at individual flowers which have only just opened, as these offer the most nectar. As they probe for nectar, honeyeaters end up with large quantities of pollen on their beaks, foreheads and throats, some of which they subsequently transfer to other flowers. This transfer is quite efficient: flowers typically lose nearly all their pollen within four hours of opening, and pollen is deposited on the majority of stigmata. Around 15% of these stigmata end up with pollen lodged in the stigmatic groove, a prerequisite to fertilisation.

The structure of the Banksia flower, with the style end functioning as a pollen presenter, suggests that autogamous self-fertilisation must be common. In many Banksia species, the risk of this occurring is reduced by protandry: a delay in a flower's receptivity to pollen until after its own pollen has lost its viability. There is dispute, however, over whether this occurs in B. prionotes: one study claimed to have confirmed "protandrous development", yet recorded high levels of stigmatic receptivity immediately after anthesis, and long pollen viability, observations that are not consistent with protandry.

If it does occur, protandry does nothing to prevent geitonogamous self-pollination: that is, pollination with pollen from another flower on the same plant. In fact, when birds forage at B. prionotes, only about a quarter of all movements from inflorescence to inflorescence involve a change of plant. Geitonogamous self-pollination must therefore occur more often in this species than cross-pollination. This does not imply high rates of self-fertilisation, however, as the species appears highly self-incompatible: although pollen grains will germinate on flowers of the self plant, they apparently fail to produce pollen tubes that penetrate the style. Even where cross-pollination does occur, fertilisation rate is fairly low. It is speculated that this is related to "a variety of chemical reactions at the pollen-stigma interface".

Cone production varies a great deal from year to year, but, as a result of its low flowering rate, is generally very low. However, there are typically a very high number of follicles per cone, leading to relatively high seed counts. There is some seed predation, primarily from the curculionid weevil Cechides amoenus.

=== Response to fire ===
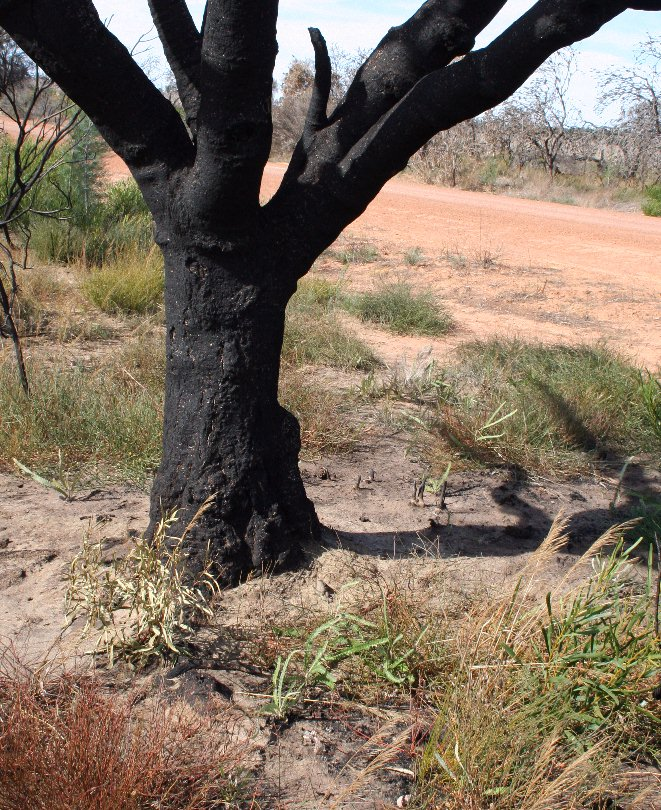
After a bushfire. Fire has killed the maternal tree, but has also triggered the release of seed, ensuring population recovery.

Like many plants in south-west Western Australia, B. prionotes is adapted to an environment in which bushfire events are relatively frequent. Most Banksia species can be placed in one of two broad groups according to their response to fire: reseeders are killed by fire, but fire also triggers the release of their canopy seed bank, thus promoting recruitment of the next generation; resprouters survive fire, resprouting from a lignotuber or, more rarely, epicormic buds protected by thick bark. B. prionotes is unusual in that it does not fit neatly into either of these groups. It lacks a lignotuber or thick bark, and so cannot be considered a resprouter; yet it may survive or escape some fires because of its height, the sparseness of its foliage, and because it occurs in dune swales where fires are cooler and patchier. On the other hand, it is not a typical reseeder either, because of its relatively low fire mortality rates, and because it is only weakly serotinous: although fire promotes seed release, seed release still occurs in the absence of fire.

The actual degree of serotiny and fire mortality in B. prionotes varies with latitude, or, more likely, climate. Observations suggest that it is always killed by fire in the north of its range, which is relatively hot and dry, and where individual plants are usually smaller, but may survive fire in the cooler, moister south. Moreover, it is essentially non-serotinous in the south, since all seed is released by the end of the second year. Seed retention increases steadily to the north, and at the northern end of its range, it typically takes around four years for a plant to release half of its seed in the absence of bushfire, with some seed retained for up to 12 years.

A number of other characteristics of B. prionotes can be understood as secondary responses to weak serotiny. For example, winter flowering ensures that seed is ripe by the beginning of the bushfire season; this is very important for weakly serotinous species, which rely heavily upon the current year's seed crop. Another example is the deciduous florets of B. prionotes. In strongly serotinous species, the old florets are retained on the cones, where they function as fire fuel, helping to ensure that follicles reach temperatures sufficient to trigger seed release. In B. prionotes, however, seed release is triggered at relatively low temperatures: in one study, 50% of follicles opened at 265 °C (509 °F), and 90% opened at 330 °C (626 °F). In contrast, the closely related but strongly serotinous B. hookeriana required 340 and 500 °C (644 and 932 °F) respectively. Floret retention would therefore be to no advantage, and might even prevent seed from escaping spontaneously opened follicles.

Seed release in B. prionotes is promoted by repeated wetting of the cones. The seed separator that holds the seeds in place is hygroscopic; its two wings pull together when wet, then spread and curl inwards as it dries out again. In doing so, it functions as a lever, gradually prying seeds out of a follicle over the course of a wet-dry cycle. This adaptation ensures that seed release following fire is delayed until the onset of rain, when germination and seedling survival rates are higher.

Because of its higher susceptibility and lower reliance on fire for reproduction, the optimal fire interval for B. prionotes is higher than for other Banksia species with which it occurs. One simulation suggested an interval of 18 years was optimal for B. prionotes, compared to 15 years for B. hookeriana and 11 years for B. attenuata. The same model suggested that B. prionotes is quite susceptible to reductions in fire intervals. On the other hand, it shows little susceptibility to increases in fire interval: although senescence and death are often observed in plants older than about 30 years, healthy stands have been observed that have escaped fire for 50 years. These stands have a multi-aged structure, demonstrating the occurrence of successful inter-fire recruitment.

Fire response may also furnish an explanation for the evolution of this species. The differences in fire regime between dune crests and swales would have created different evolutionary pressures, with plants on crests adapting to frequent hot fires by becoming strongly serotinous, and plants in swales adapting to patchier, cooler fires with weaker serotiny. Speciation would be made possible by the much reduced genetic exchange between crest plants and swale plants, although evidence suggests that there was some introgression at first. Eventually, however, the need for weakly serotinous plants to produce ripe seed before the bushfire season would have brought forward their flowering season until the two flowering seasons no longer overlapped; thus a phenological barrier to exchange was erected, allowing the two populations to drift independently of each other.

== Conservation ==
Banksia prionotes is susceptible to a number of threatening processes. It is highly susceptible to Phytophthora cinnamomi dieback; wild populations are harvested commercially by the cut flower industry; and some of its range is subject to land clearing for urban or agricultural purposes. An assessment of the potential impact of climate change on this species found that severe change is likely to lead to a reduction in its range of around 50% by 2080; and even mild change is projected to cause a reduction of 30%; but under mid-severity scenarios the distribution may actually grow, depending on how effectively it can migrate into newly habitable areas. However, this study does not address the potential of climate change to alter fire regimes; these have already been impacted by the arrival of humans, and this change is thought to have led to a decline in the abundance and range of B. prionotes.

The species as a whole is not considered particularly vulnerable to these factors, however, as it is so widely distributed and common. Western Australia's Department of Environment and Conservation does not consider it to be rare, and has not included it on their Declared Rare and Priority Flora List. It nonetheless has high conservation importance in at least one context: it is a keystone mutualist in the Avon Wheatbelt, where it is the only source of nectar during a critical period of the year when no other nectar-producing plant is in flower. The loss of B. prionotes from the region would therefore mean the loss of all the honeyeaters as well, and this would affect the many other species of plants that rely on honeyeaters for pollination. The primary vegetation community in which Banksia prionotes occurs in the Avon Wheatbelt is considered a priority ecological community, and is proposed for formal gazetting as a threatened ecological community under the name "Banksia prionotes and Xylomelum angustifolium low woodlands on transported yellow sand". Although currently in near-pristine and static condition, it is considered at risk due to a large number of threatening processes, including land clearing, landscape fragmentation, rising soil salinity, grazing pressure, competition with weeds, changes to the fire regime, rubbish dumping, and P. cinnamomi dieback.

== Cultivation ==
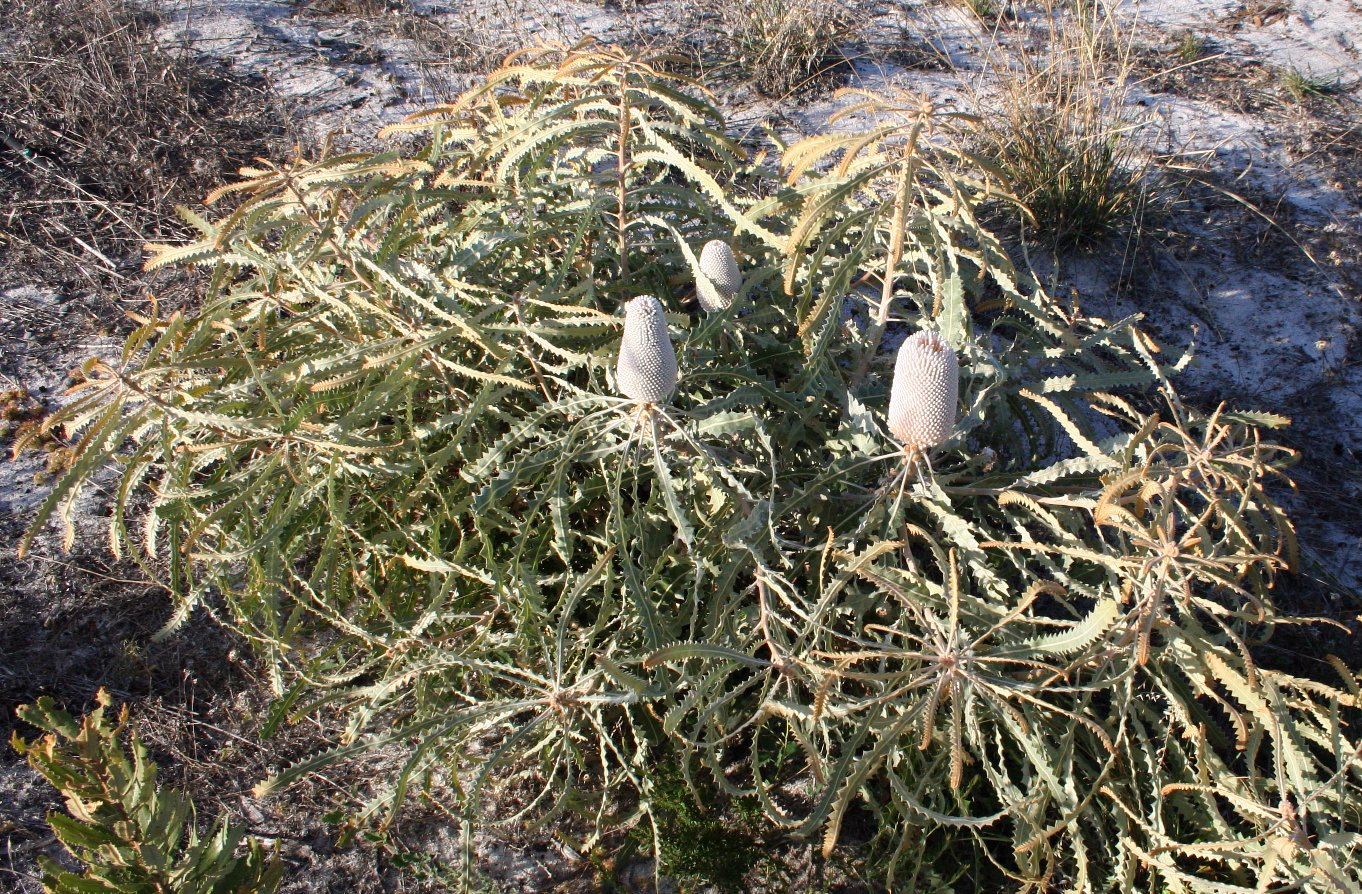
Dwarf form in cultivation, with inflorescences in late bud

Described as "an outstanding ornamental species" by ASGAP, its brightly coloured, conspicuous flower spikes make B. prionotes a popular garden plant. It is good for attracting honeyeaters to the garden, and sometimes flowers twice a year. A low growing dwarf form which reaches 1 m (3.3 ft) high is available in Western Australia, sold as "Little Kalbarri Candles".

It is fairly easy to grow in areas with a Mediterranean climate, but does not do well in areas with high summer humidity. It requires a sunny position in well-drained soil, and tolerates at least moderate frost. It should be pruned lightly, not below the green foliage, as it tends to become straggly with age otherwise. Seeds do not require any treatment prior to sowing, and take 21 to 35 days to germinate.

The species is also considered ideal for cut flower production, as its flowers fulfill the commercial criteria of terminal blooms and a long stem length. As such it is one of the most popular banksias for cut flower production, with commercial crops grown in Israel, Victoria, South Australia and Hawaii.
