= Gingin scarp =

Gingin scarp is a scarp that lies to the west of the Darling Scarp in Western Australia, with the Dandaragan plateau formed between the two scarps. At the southern end of the scarp it lies to the east of the Swan Coastal Plain, to the further north the adjacent sandplain is Eneabba sandplain.

The scarp is formed just north of Bullsbrook The Banksia species Banksia hookeriana is linked with the geology and geomorphology of the scarp.
