= Banksia 'Waite Orange' =

Cultivar of Banksia hookeriana

- Hybrid parentage: B. hookeriana × prionotes
- Cultivar: 'Waite Orange'
- Origin: Waite Agricultural Research Institute, University of Adelaide, South Australia

Banksia 'Waite Orange' is a variety (in the plant breeders' rights sense) of Banksia. A hybrid between B. hookeriana (Hooker's Banksia) and B. prionotes (Acorn Banksia), it is generally intermediate in morphology between those two species.

It was bred in 1988 from an open pollination seedling of B. hookeriana, during a breeding program conducted by Dr Margaret Sedgley of the Department of Horticulture, Viticulture and Oenology, Waite Agricultural Research Institute of the University of Adelaide in Adelaide, South Australia. Three years later it was registered as a variety by Luminis Pty Ltd, a wholly owned subsidiary of the university; the registration was granted on 6 April 1992.

It is claimed to be distinguishable as having "the following combination of characters: a perennial bushy scrub; inflorescence with buff perianths and bright orange style tips; mid green leaves; leaf width, leaf length, plant height and plant width all intermediate between those of Banksia hookeriana and Banksia prionotes." It produces larger inflorescences than either parent, and more of them, making it useful to the cut flower trade.
