= Dandaragan plateau =

Geographical feature in Western Australia

Dandaragan plateau is a feature between the Darling Scarp and Gingin scarp in Western Australia.

Dandaragan locality and Shire of Dandaragan council of the same name occur on the plateau.

The integrity of the Boonanarring reserve on the plateau is notable due to its sustaining animals that are lost on the Swan Coastal Plain.

The geology and flora of the plateau has been studied and reported for some time.
