= Vulnerability and susceptibility in conservation biology =

In conservation biology, susceptibility is the extent to which an organism or ecological community would suffer from a threatening process or factor if exposed, without regard to the likelihood of exposure. It should not be confused with vulnerability, which takes into account both the effect of exposure and the likelihood of exposure.

For example, a plant species may be highly susceptible to a particular plant disease, meaning that exposed populations invariably become extinct or decline heavily. However, that species may not be vulnerable if it occurs only in areas where exposure to the disease is unlikely, or if it occurs over such a wide distribution that exposure of all populations is unlikely. Conversely, a plant species may show low susceptibility to a disease, yet may be considered vulnerable if the disease is present in every population.
