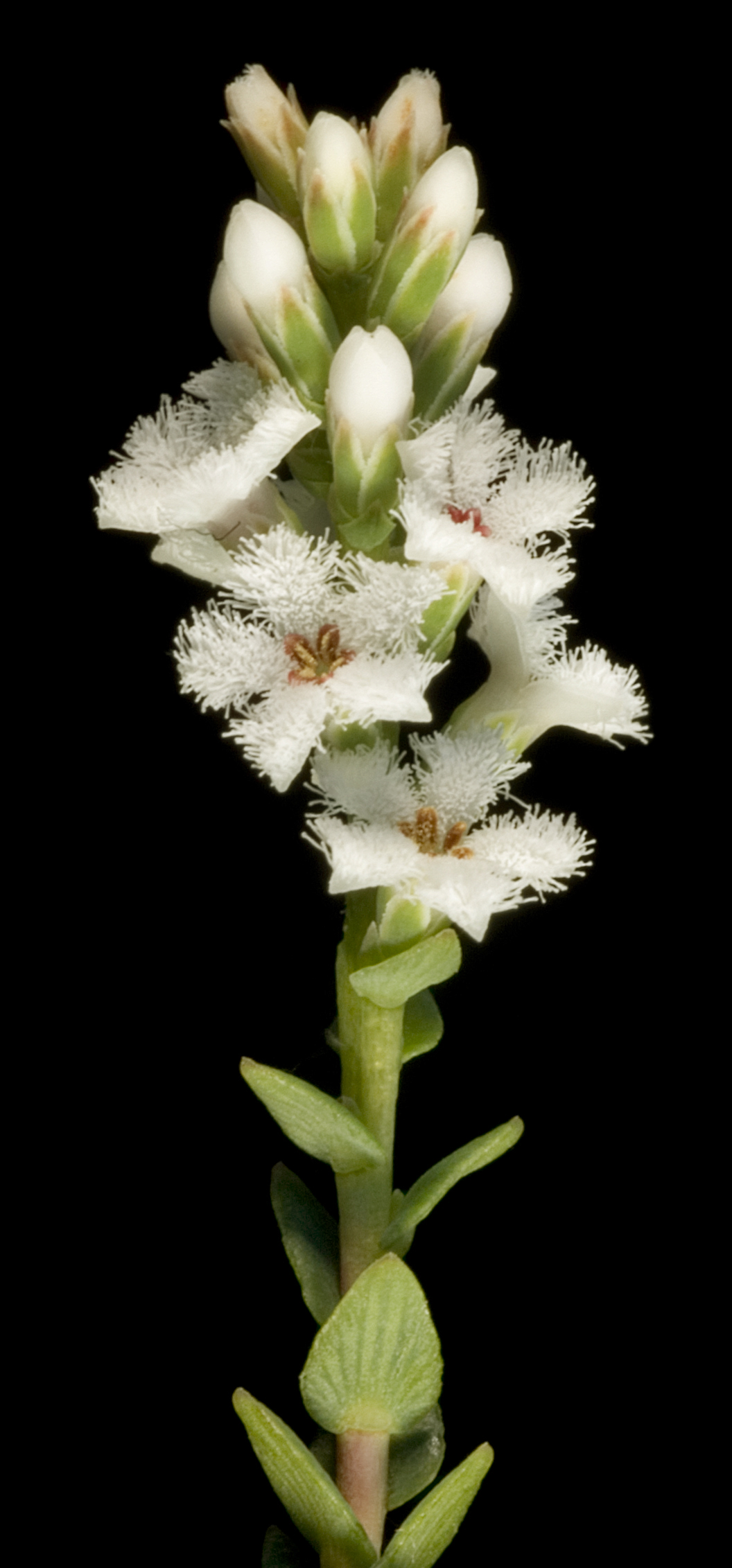

Scientific classification
- Kingdom: Plantae
- Clade: Tracheophytes
- Clade: Angiosperms
- Clade: Eudicots
- Clade: Asterids
- Order: Ericales
- Family: Ericaceae
- Genus: Leucopogon
- Species: L. glabellus

Binomial name
- Leucopogon glabellus R.Br.
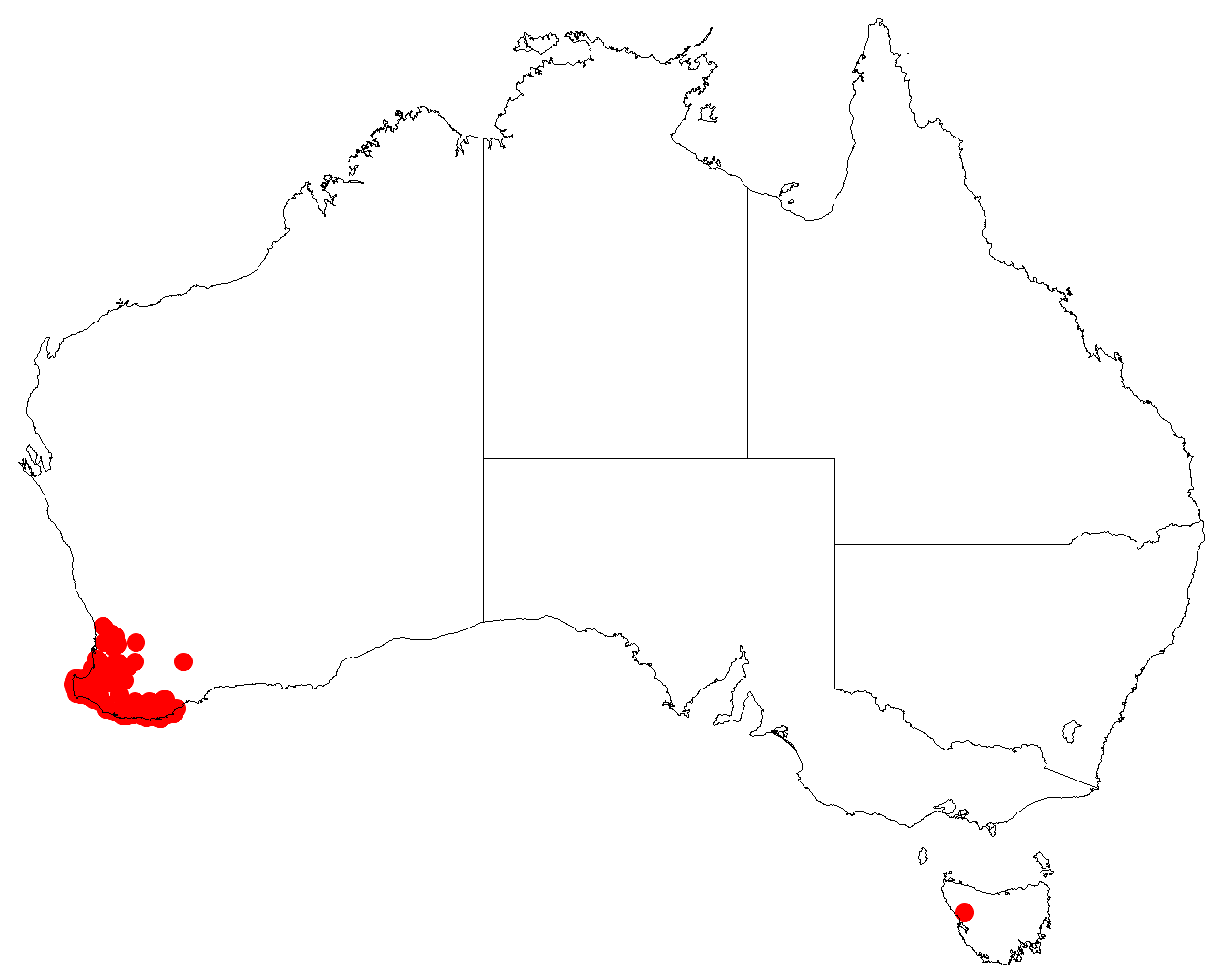
- Occurrence data from AVH

Synonyms
- Leucopogon glabellus R.Br. var. glabellus; Leucopogon variifolius Sond.; Styphelia glabella (R.Br.) Spreng.; Styphelia variifolia (Sond.) F.Muell.

= Leucopogon glabellus =

Species of shrub

Leucopogon glabellus is a species of flowering plant in the family Ericaceae and is endemic to the south-west of Western Australia. It is an erect, glabrous shrub with slender branchlets, heart-shaped to lance-shaped leaves, and cylindrical spikes of white flowers.

== Description ==
Leucopogon glabellus is an erect or straggly shrub that typically grows to a height of 0.1–1 m (3.9 in – 3 ft 3.4 in) and has slender branchlets. Its leaves are heart-shaped to lance-shaped and 2–4 mm (0.079–0.157 in) long, narrower leaves sometimes to 6 mm (0.24 in) long. The flowers are arranged in cylindrical, many-flowered spikes on the ends of branches with small, leaf-like bracts and bracteoles less than half as long as the sepals. The sepals are less than 2 mm (0.079 in) long and the petals white and about 3 mm (0.12 in) long, forming a tube with lobes longer than the petal tube.

== Taxonomy ==
Leucopogon glabellus was first formally described in 1810 by Robert Brown in his Prodromus Florae Novae Hollandiae et Insulae Van Diemen . The specific epithet (glabellus) means "glabrous".

== Distribution and habitat ==
This leucopogon grows in winter-wet places, on granite outcrops and on hills and is widespread in the Avon Wheatbelt, Esperance Plains, Jarrah Forest, Mallee, Swan Coastal Plain and Warren bioregions of south-western Western Australia.
