= Watheroo National Park =

National park in Western Australia

- IUCN category II (national park)
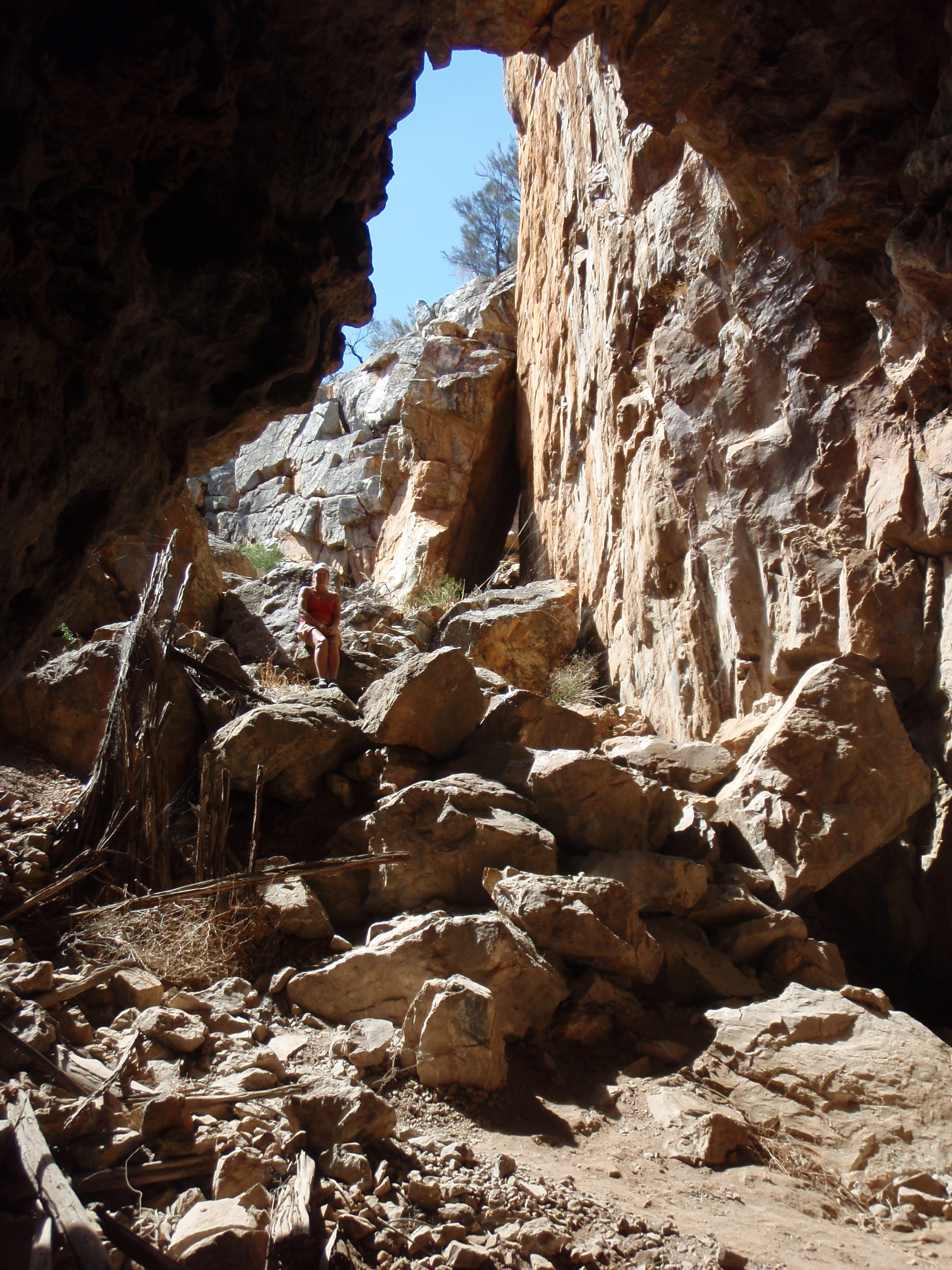
- Jingemia Cave

- Location within Western Australia
- Location: Western Australia
- Nearest city: Moora
- Coordinates: 30°14′24″S 115°52′43″E
- Area: 444.81 km^{2} (171.74 sq mi)
- Established: 1969
- Governing body: Department of Environment and Conservation
- Website: Official website

Watheroo National Park is a national park in Western Australia, 187 km north of Perth. It contains Jingemia Cave.

The park is situated in the Mid West region of Western Australia to the west of the Midlands Road between the towns of Badgingarra to the west and Dalwallinu to the east. The border of the park abuts Pinjarrega Nature Reserve to the north but is otherwise surrounded by farmland. Low Creek borders the park to the east, and then flows south to join Moore River.

The park is mostly composed of sand plain country, which supports populations of heath, mallee and Banksia and many wildflowers. Eucalypt stands can be found to the western end of the park. Other species include spinifex, wandoo and yorm gum. Some of the wildflowers found within the park include kwongan, bush cauliflower and scarlet featherflower.

The name of the park comes from the Indigenous Australian name of a nearby spring; it is also the name of a town located to the east of the park.

Composed mostly of quartz-based sand with outcrops of sandstone at times having a laterite cap, the area acts as a basin between the Dandaragan plateau and the Darling plateau.

In 2010, the Environmental Protection Authority of Western Australia gave approval to survey the Warro gas field that is located beneath the park. The company Latent Petroleum was given permission to conduct a seismic survey, allowing them to drive over vegetation.

== See also ==
- Protected areas of Western Australia
