= Eneabba sandplain =

Northern part of the Swan Coastal Plain

Coordinates: 29.894345°S 115.271851°E

The Eneabba sandplain, or the Eneabba portion of the northern sandplain, is an extension of the Swan Coastal Plain in Western Australia.

The town of Eneabba is located on the sandplain, as are former and current sand mining operations.

The sandplain is a habitat for kwongan.
