= Eneabba, Western Australia =

Eneabba
- Town
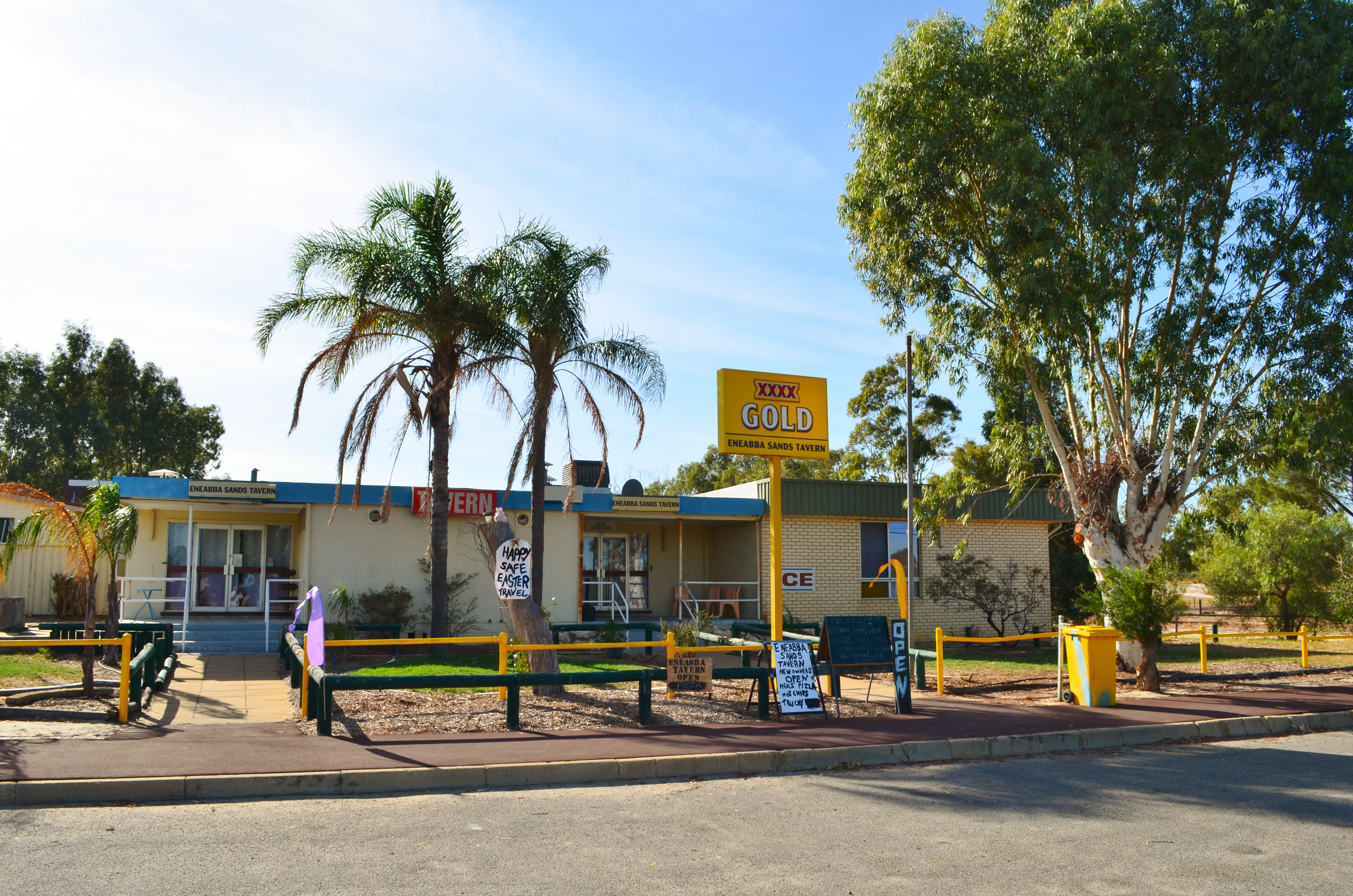
- Eneabba Sands Tavern, 2014

- Interactive map of Eneabba
- Coordinates: 29°49′09″S 115°16′09″E
- Country: Australia
- State: Western Australia
- LGA: Shire of Carnamah
- Location: 282 km (175 mi) N of Perth; 31 km (19 mi) ENE of Leeman; 70 km (43 mi) SE of Dongara
- Established: 1961

Government
  - State electorate: Moore
  - Federal division: Durack

Area
  - Total: 1,407.6 km^{2} (543.5 sq mi)
- Elevation: 99 m (325 ft)

Population
  - Total: 142 (SAL 2021)
- Postcode: 6518

Eneabba is a town on the Brand Highway 278 kilometres (173 mi) north of Perth, in Western Australia.

== History ==
Long before Europeans visited or settled in Eneabba, the Yamatji people inhabited the region. The name of the town derives from the local Aboriginal word for "ground spring".

The first European visit to the area was in 1839 by the second disastrous George Grey expedition along the west coast. Grey and his party were forced to walk through the area after their boats were lost. On 11 April, Grey came across and named the Arrowsmith River, after John Arrowsmith the English cartographer.

The next Europeans in the area were government assistant surveyor Augustus Charles Gregory and Francis Thomas Gregory (both attached to the department of the Surveyor General of Western Australia) and their brother Henry Churchman Gregory, on a public-private funded expedition to search for new agricultural land beyond the settled areas. They camped at Eneabba Springs, 14 km (9 mi) east of Eneabba on 14 September 1846, while returning to Perth from the Irwin River.

In 1870 the first settler, William Horsley Rowland, arrived from Greenough. He took up a 1,200 ha (3,000-acre) lease at Eneabba Springs and survived by shepherding, trapping horses and pigs, and living on wild game.

The area around Eneabba (also known as the Eneabba sandplain) was opened up for agricultural purposes in the 1950s for a large group of model farms comprising the Eneabba War Service Land Settlement Project.

This in turn initiated the need for a town to be developed. The town was gazetted on 27 January 1961, on the site of Rowland's original homestead.

In April 1976, the Dongara–Eneabba railway line opened, linking the Iluka Resources mineral sands mine at Eneabba to the Midland railway line at Dongara.

== Attractions and facilities ==
The area is famous for its spectacular display of wildflowers in the spring.

== Resources and industry ==
The Warradarge Wind Farm, located southeast of Eneabba, has been operational since August 2020.

Since the early 1990s, Iluka Resources has been producing monazite and xenotime, which are rare-earth-bearing minerals, as by-products of processing mineral sands that produce zircon, used in ceramics, and titanium dioxide, which is used in paint pigment, plastics, and paper. These byproducts have an estimated value of US$650m (£440m) in 2025, and have been stockpiled in a disused mining hole near its Narngulu Mineral Separation Plant at Eneabba. Iluka commissioned a processing plant that separates the monazite (and additional zircon), producing a 90% monazite concentrate that will be input to a new fully-integrated rare earths refinery at Eneabba. This was completed in 2022. The development is supported by an Australian Government loan of AU$1.25 billion under its Critical Minerals Strategy. From 2027, neodymium, praseodymium, dysprosium, terbium, and other rare-earth elements will be produced at the facility. With the demand for rare earths growing by 50–170% between 2025 and 2030, and most of the rare-earths being produced by China in recent years, the plant is aiming to supply a significant proportion of Western demand for rare-earths. Iluka has to work within the Australian legislative framework to avoid polluting the environment, as processing rare-earths involves extraction, leaching, thermal cracking, and refining, which produce radioactive components.

== Climate ==
Eneabba has a hot-summer Mediterranean climate (Köppen Csa).

Climate data for Eneabba (1981–2010 normals; extremes 1972–2017)
| Month | Jan | Feb | Mar | Apr | May | Jun | Jul | Aug | Sep | Oct | Nov | Dec | Year |
|---|---|---|---|---|---|---|---|---|---|---|---|---|---|
| Record high °C (°F) | 47.3 (117.1) | 48.7 (119.7) | 44.9 (112.8) | 40.0 (104.0) | 36.1 (97.0) | 29.0 (84.2) | 29.3 (84.7) | 30.5 (86.9) | 35.4 (95.7) | 41.0 (105.8) | 45.2 (113.4) | 45.9 (114.6) | 48.7 (119.7) |
| Mean daily maximum °C (°F) | 36.3 (97.3) | 36.3 (97.3) | 33.6 (92.5) | 29.6 (85.3) | 24.5 (76.1) | 20.9 (69.6) | 19.6 (67.3) | 20.7 (69.3) | 23.2 (73.8) | 26.8 (80.2) | 30.3 (86.5) | 33.3 (91.9) | 27.9 (82.2) |
| Mean daily minimum °C (°F) | 18.6 (65.5) | 19.4 (66.9) | 18.1 (64.6) | 15.4 (59.7) | 12.4 (54.3) | 10.2 (50.4) | 8.9 (48.0) | 9.0 (48.2) | 9.8 (49.6) | 11.4 (52.5) | 14.0 (57.2) | 16.1 (61.0) | 13.6 (56.5) |
| Record low °C (°F) | 9.2 (48.6) | 8.8 (47.8) | 9.7 (49.5) | 7.6 (45.7) | 4.2 (39.6) | 1.7 (35.1) | 0.5 (32.9) | 2.3 (36.1) | 2.9 (37.2) | 3.4 (38.1) | 5.9 (42.6) | 7.5 (45.5) | 0.5 (32.9) |
| Average precipitation mm (inches) | 8.3 (0.33) | 15.3 (0.60) | 15.5 (0.61) | 22.4 (0.88) | 71.6 (2.82) | 88.0 (3.46) | 93.3 (3.67) | 75.4 (2.97) | 46.8 (1.84) | 22.8 (0.90) | 15.5 (0.61) | 10.4 (0.41) | 486.3 (19.15) |
| Average precipitation days | 1.5 | 2.1 | 2.9 | 5.1 | 10.2 | 12.8 | 14.7 | 13.4 | 10.7 | 6.4 | 4.2 | 2.4 | 86.4 |
| Average afternoon relative humidity (%) | 31 | 30 | 34 | 40 | 47 | 55 | 57 | 54 | 49 | 42 | 38 | 33 | 43 |
Source: Bureau of Meteorology
