= List of Phyllachora species =

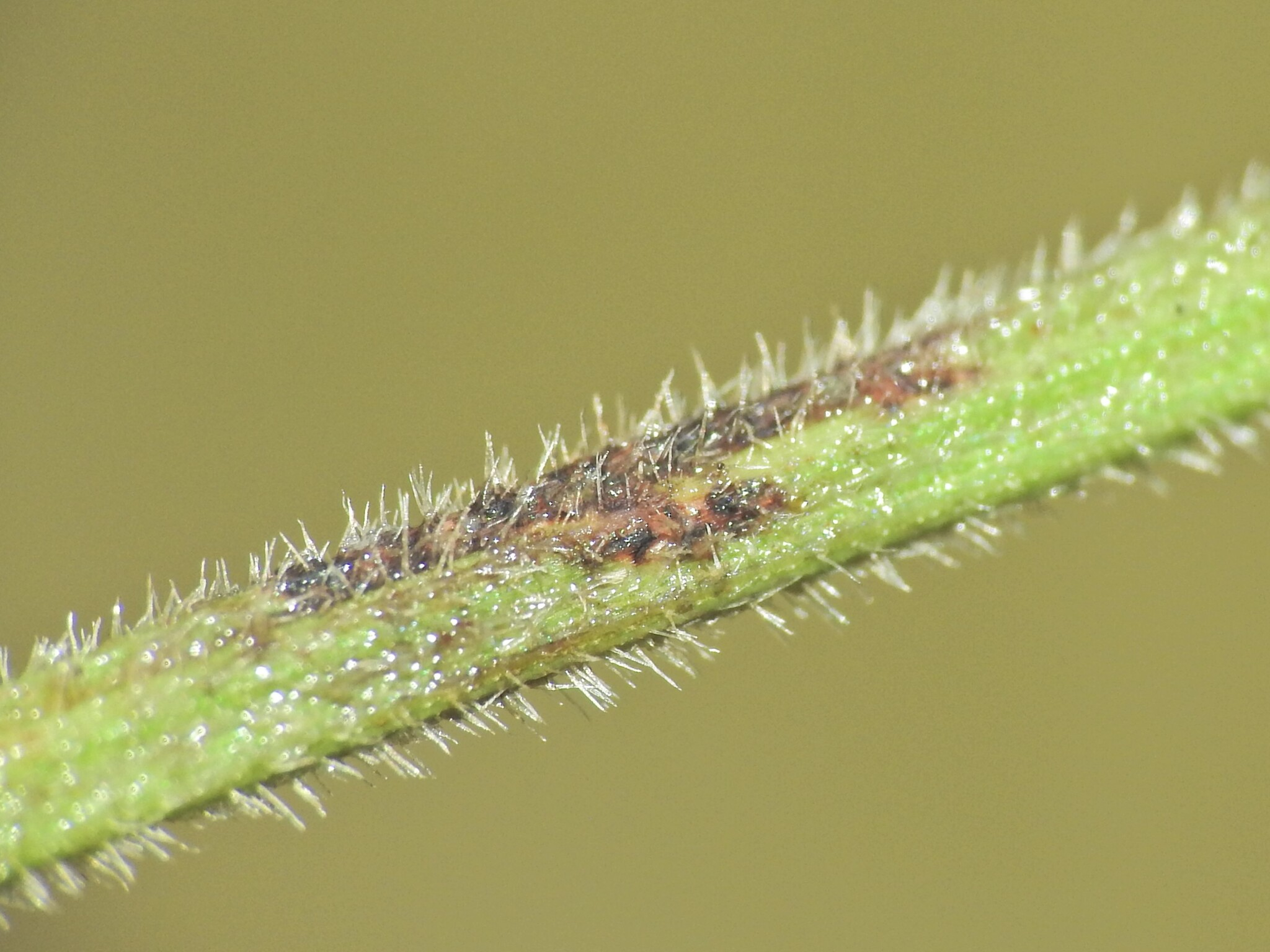
Phyllachora fimbristylidis

This is a list of binomial names in the fungi genus Phyllachora (in the family of Phyllachoraceae), with just accepted species and not including synonyms. (See Species Fungorum for former species)

Outline of Fungi and fungus-like taxa lists up to 1513 species (in 2020). 1384 records are listed by Species Fungorum, (but this also includes former species).

== A ==
- Phyllachora aberiae Henn. (1908)
- Phyllachora abortiva (Desm.) Fuckel (1870)
- Phyllachora abri (Subhedar & V.G. Rao) P.F. Cannon (1991)
- Phyllachora abutilonis Garcés (1944)
- Phyllachora abyssinica Henn. (1893)
- Phyllachora acaciae Henn. (1894)
- Phyllachora acaenae Henn. (1900)
- Phyllachora accedens Theiss. & Syd. (1915)
- Phyllachora acervulata (Schwein. ex Fr.) Sacc. (1883)
- Phyllachora actinodaphnes Uppal, Patel & V.P. Bhide (1950)
- Phyllachora acutispora Speg. (1891)
- Phyllachora adolphiae Ellis & Kellerm. (1904)
- Phyllachora advena Syd. (1925)
- Phyllachora aegiphilae F. Stevens (1924)
- Phyllachora aegopodii Fuckel (1870)
- Phyllachora afra Syd. (1939)
- Phyllachora africana Parbery (1971)
- Phyllachora afzeliae Syd. & P. Syd. (1913)
- Phyllachora agharkarii Tilak (1959)
- Phyllachora ajrekarii Syd. & P. Syd. (1912)
- Phyllachora alamoi Chardón (1934)
- Phyllachora aliena Syd. & P. Syd. (1912)
- Phyllachora alnicola Rostr. (1880)
- Phyllachora aloetica (Berk. & M.A. Curtis) Sacc. (1883)
- Phyllachora alpiniae Sacc. & Berl. (1885)
- Phyllachora alyxiae Pat. (1896)
- Phyllachora amaniensis Henn. (1905)
- Phyllachora amazonensis (Bat. & J.L. Bezerra) P.F. Cannon (1991)
- Phyllachora ambigua (Syd. & P. Syd.) Syd. (1915)
- Phyllachora americana Parbery (1967)
- Phyllachora amica Syd. (1938)
- Phyllachora amphibola Syd. (1926)
- Phyllachora amphidyma Penz. & Sacc. (1898)
- Phyllachora amphigena Speg. (1885)
- Phyllachora amplexicaulis C.A. Pearce, Reddell & K.D. Hyde (2001)
- Phyllachora amyridicola Seaver (1928)
- Phyllachora amyridis Seaver (1928)
- Phyllachora anacardiarum Chardón (1934)
- Phyllachora anceps Sacc. (1890)
- Phyllachora andamanica Sreekumar & Hosag. (1991)
- Phyllachora andicola (Speg.) Viégas (1947)
- Phyllachora andropogonis P. Karst. & Har. (1890)
- Phyllachora angelicae (Fr.) Fuckel (1870)
- Phyllachora angustispora Speg. (1918)
- Phyllachora annonaceae Rehm (1897)
- Phyllachora annonicola Chardón (1940)
- Phyllachora annulata Sacc. (1883)
- Phyllachora annuliformis Speg. (1889)
- Phyllachora anomala (Berk. & M.A. Curtis) Sacc. (1883)
- Phyllachora antarctica Speg. (1924)
- Phyllachora anthephorae Syd. & P. Syd. (1915)
- Phyllachora anthistiriae Racib. (1915)
- Phyllachora apiahyna Speg. (1889)
- Phyllachora apoensis Syd. & P. Syd. (1911)
- Phyllachora applanata G. Winter (1887)
- Phyllachora araliae (Pat.) Petr. (1927)
- Phyllachora araliarum Petr. (1968)
- Phyllachora aravalliensis Dakshini, Tandon & Mukerji (1970)
- Phyllachora ardisiae Henn. (1908)
- Phyllachora arechavaletae Speg. (1889)
- Phyllachora aristidae (Schwein.) Sacc. (1883)
- Phyllachora arthraxonis Henn. (1904)
- Phyllachora asclepiadis (Schwein.) Sacc. (1883)
- Phyllachora aspidea (Berk.) Sacc. (1883)
- Phyllachora aspideoides Sacc. & Berl. (1885)
- Phyllachora asterigena Ellis & Everh. (1894)
- Phyllachora asteromorpha (Schwein.) Sacc. (1883)
- Phyllachora astronii Speg. (1885)
- Phyllachora ateleiae Seaver (1920)
- Phyllachora atrofigurans Rehm (1913)
- Phyllachora atroinquinans G. Winter (1887)
- Phyllachora atromaculans Syd. & P. Syd. (1913)

== B ==
- Phyllachora bakeriana Henn. (1908)
- Phyllachora balakrishnanii Hosag., Manian & Vasuki (1989)
- Phyllachora baldensis Petr. (1929)
- Phyllachora bambusae (Sacc.) Cooke (1885)
- Phyllachora bambusina Speg. (1885)
- Phyllachora banahaensis Petr. (1929)
- Phyllachora banisteriae F. Stevens & Dalbey (1919)
- Phyllachora banksiae (H.J. Swart) C.A. Pearce & K.D. Hyde (2001)
- Phyllachora baphispora Syd. (1926)
- Phyllachora barnadesiae Syd. (1939)
- Phyllachora barringtoniae (Berk. & Broome) Sacc. (1883)
- Phyllachora barringtoniicola K.D. Hyde & C.A. Pearce (1993)
- Phyllachora bauhiniae (G. Winter) Theiss. & Syd. (1915)
- Phyllachora baumii Henn. (1903)
- Phyllachora beaumontii Berk. & M.A. Curtis ex Cooke (1885)
- Phyllachora begoniae Pat. (1895)
- Phyllachora bella Syd. (1937)
- Phyllachora betulae-nanae (Wahlenb.) Sacc. (1883)
- Phyllachora biareolata Speg. (1888)
- Phyllachora biguttulata Theiss. (1910)
- Phyllachora bischofiae Syd. & P. Syd. (1911)
- Phyllachora blanquillo Speg. (1909)
- Phyllachora blepharoneuri Fairm. (1918)
- Phyllachora bogotensis Petr. (1947)
- Phyllachora bontocensis Syd. (1923)
- Phyllachora bourreriae F. Stevens & Dalbey (1919)
- Phyllachora brachyspora Speg. (1918)
- Phyllachora brachystegiae Doidge (1924)
- Phyllachora brachystemonis (Schwein.) Sacc. (1883)
- Phyllachora brasiliensis Speg. (1881)
- Phyllachora brenesii Syd. (1929)
- Phyllachora brittoniana (Chardón) Seaver (1928)
- Phyllachora bromi Fuckel (1870)
- Phyllachora brosimi Bat. & J.L. Bezerra (1964)
- Phyllachora buchenaviae Petr. & Cif. (1932)
- Phyllachora buddlejae G. Arnaud (1934)
- Phyllachora bulbosa Parbery (1967)
- Phyllachora bullulata (Berk.) Cooke (1885)
- Phyllachora burgessiae Doidge (1942)
- Phyllachora butleri (Theiss. & Syd.) Petr. (1929)
- Phyllachora byttneriae F. Stevens (1931)

== C ==
- Phyllachora caesalpiniae (Pat.) Arx & E. Müll. (1954)
- Phyllachora caffra (Syd. & P. Syd.) Theiss. & Syd. (1915)
- Phyllachora calamagrostidis Sawada (1952)
- Phyllachora calami K.D. Hyde & P.F. Cannon (1999)
- Phyllachora callistemonis Rodway (1918)
- Phyllachora calycophylli Speg. (1922)
- Phyllachora canavaliae Syd. (1928)
- Phyllachora cannabis Henn. (1908)
- Phyllachora cantonensis Syd. & P. Syd. (1920)
- Phyllachora capensis (Doidge) Doidge (1942)
- Phyllachora capparis J.A. Stev. (1975)
- Phyllachora caricis-jaluensis H.J. Lu & T. Zhang (2009)
- Phyllachora carnea Petr. (1928)
- Phyllachora carpodini S. Hughes (1953)
- Phyllachora caseariae Henn. (1904)
- Phyllachora casimiroae F. Stevens & C.J. King (1927)
- Phyllachora cassiae Henn. (1895)
- Phyllachora castaneae (Schwein.) Sacc. (1883)
- Phyllachora catervaria (Berk.) Sacc. (1883)
- Phyllachora catesbyana Chardón (1932)
- Phyllachora cayennensis (DC.) Cooke (1885)
- Phyllachora cecropiae (Rehm) Arx & E. Müll. (1954)
- Phyllachora celastri R.K. Verma & Kamal (1990)
- Phyllachora centothecae Syd. & P. Syd. (1915)
- Phyllachora cepae (Schwein.) Sacc. (1883)
- Phyllachora chalybaea (Schwein.) Sacc. (1883)
- Phyllachora chenopodii (Schwein.) Sacc. (1883)
- Phyllachora chimonobambusae I. Hino & Katum. (1955)
- Phyllachora chloridis Dayar., R.G. Shivas & K.D. Hyde (2017)
- Phyllachora chrysopogonicola Tamakaew, Cheew. & K.D. Hyde (2017)
- Phyllachora chusqueae Henn. & Lindau (1897)
- Phyllachora chusqueana Garcés (1941)
- Phyllachora cibotii Hodges (1981)
- Phyllachora ciferrii Chardón (1932)
- Phyllachora cinerascens (Schwein.) Sacc. (1883)
- Phyllachora cinerea Ellis & Everh. (1904)
- Phyllachora cinnae Tehon & E.Y. Daniels (1927)
- Phyllachora cinnamomi Hansf. (1958)
- Phyllachora circinans (Pat.) Petr. (1927)
- Phyllachora citharexyli (Rehm) Höhn. (1907)
- Phyllachora cladii-glomerati Hansf. (1958)
- Phyllachora clavata Garcés (1944)
- Phyllachora clibadii Petr. (1950)
- Phyllachora clusiae Petr. (1948)
- Phyllachora clypeata (Theiss.) Theiss. (1915)
- Phyllachora coccolobae Speg. (1909)
- Phyllachora coicis Henn. (1895)
- Phyllachora columbiensis (Chardón) P.F. Cannon (1989)
- Phyllachora compositae (Rick) Bat. & A.F. Vital (1957)
- Phyllachora concentrica Rossman (1986)
- Phyllachora concinna Syd. (1938)
- Phyllachora condigna Petr. (1950)
- Phyllachora conferta (Schwein.) Sacc. (1883)
- Phyllachora congregata Theiss. & Syd. (1915)
- Phyllachora conica (Chardón) Petr. (1931)
- Phyllachora connari Syd. & P. Syd. (1914)
- Phyllachora connarina Racib. (1915)
- Phyllachora consociata Chardón (1932)
- Phyllachora conspicua Ferd. & Winge (1908)
- Phyllachora conspurcata (Berk.) Sacc. (1883)
- Phyllachora contigua Syd. (1939)
- Phyllachora coorgiana Seshadri (1966)
- Phyllachora copaiferae Speg. (1885)
- Phyllachora copeyensis Henn. (1902)
- Phyllachora corallina Höhn. (1909)
- Phyllachora costaericae Trotter (1926)
- Phyllachora costaricensis E. Bommer & M. Rousseau (1896)
- Phyllachora coutoubeae (Henn.) Arx (1958)
- Phyllachora crotonicola Pat. (1893)
- Phyllachora crotonis (Cooke) Sacc. (1883)
- Phyllachora crustacea (Schwein.) Sacc. (1883)
- Phyllachora cucurbitacearum Chardón (1934)
- Phyllachora culmicola (Schwein.) Sacc. (1883)
- Phyllachora curvulispora Henn. (1908)
- Phyllachora cymbispora T.S. Ramakr. & K. Ramakr. (1947)
- Phyllachora cynodonticola Dayar., Goonas. & K.D. Hyde (2017)
- Phyllachora cynodontis Niessl (1876)
- Phyllachora cyperi Rehm (1879)
- Phyllachora cyperina Henn. (1907)

== D ==
- Phyllachora dactylidis Delacr. (1892)
- Phyllachora dalibardae (Peck) Sacc. (1883)
- Phyllachora dallasensis Petr. (1954)
- Phyllachora danthoniae (Chardón) Cif. (1961)
- Phyllachora davillae F. Stevens (1930)
- Phyllachora dawei Massee (1908)
- Phyllachora decaisneana (Lév.) Sacc. (1883)
- Phyllachora delicatula (Schwein.) Sacc. (1883)
- Phyllachora demersa (Corda) Sacc. (1883)
- Phyllachora deminuta Syd. (1930)
- Phyllachora dendritica Cooke (1885)
- Phyllachora denigrans (Schwein.) Sacc. (1883)
- Phyllachora derridicola Petr. (1947)
- Phyllachora detecta Petr. (1948)
- Phyllachora deusta (Fr.) Sacc. (1883)
- Phyllachora deviata Syd. (1925)
- Phyllachora devriesii Koord. (1907)
- Phyllachora didyma Niessl (1876)
- Phyllachora diehlii P.F. Cannon (1991)
- Phyllachora digitariicola Doidge (1942)
- Phyllachora dimeriae Theiss. & Syd. (1915)
- Phyllachora dimorphocalycicola A. Pande & V.G. Rao (1995)
- Phyllachora diocleicola Chardón (1940)
- Phyllachora dioscoreae (Schwein.) Sacc. (1883)
- Phyllachora diospyri Ullasa (1969)
- Phyllachora dischidiae Syd. & P. Syd. (1913)
- Phyllachora dispar (Syd. & P. Syd.) A. Pande (2008)
- Phyllachora dispersa (Schwein.) Sacc. (1883)
- Phyllachora disseminata Syd. & P. Syd. (1916)
- Phyllachora distinguenda Rehm (1897)
- Phyllachora dolgei Chardón (1934)
- Phyllachora dolichogena (Berk. & Broome) Sacc. (1883)
- Phyllachora dolichospora Syd. & P. Syd. (1911)
- Phyllachora dombeyae (Syd. & P. Syd.) Syd. (1915)
- Phyllachora domingensis Chardón (1927)
- Phyllachora dominicana Petr. & Cif. (1930)
- Phyllachora dothideoides (Speg.) Petr. & Syd. (1934)
- Phyllachora drypeticola F. Stevens & Dalbey (1919)
- Phyllachora dubia Petr. & Cif. (1930)
- Phyllachora duplex Rehm (1909)
- Phyllachora durantae Rehm (1892)

== E ==
- Phyllachora effigurata Syd. & P. Syd. (1903)
- Phyllachora effusa (Schwein.) Sacc. (1883)
- Phyllachora egenula Syd. (1938)
- Phyllachora ehrenbergii Reichert (1921)
- Phyllachora ehretiae Hosag. & N.C. Nair (1986)
- Phyllachora ehrhartae Marasas (1966)
- Phyllachora ekmaniana Petr. & Cif. (1930)
- Phyllachora elaeocarpi (T.S. Ramakr. & K. Ramakr.) Kamat, Seshadri & A. Pande (1976)
- Phyllachora elegans (Schwein.) Sacc. (1883)
- Phyllachora elettariae (Berk. & Broome) Cooke (1885)
- Phyllachora eleusines Speg. (1902)
- Phyllachora elionuri Doidge (1942)
- Phyllachora elliptica (Schwein.) Sacc. (1883)
- Phyllachora elmeri Syd. & P. Syd. (1911)
- Phyllachora emarginata Petr. (1948)
- Phyllachora embeliae Höhn. (1920)
- Phyllachora endiandrae C.A. Pearce & K.D. Hyde (2006)
- Phyllachora engelhardiae Racib. (1915)
- Phyllachora epicladii (Cooke & Massee) Arx (1957)
- Phyllachora episphaeria (Peck) Sacc. (1883)
- Phyllachora eriochloae Speg. (1909)
- Phyllachora ermidensis M.D.M. Santos, R.B. Medeiros & Dianese (2016)
- Phyllachora erythroxylina Petr. (1929)
- Phyllachora escalloniae Pat. (1891)
- Phyllachora espeletiae Syd. & P. Syd. (1914)
- Phyllachora eugeniae Thüm. ex Cooke (1885)
- Phyllachora eupatorii (Berk. & M.A. Curtis) Sacc. (1883)
- Phyllachora euphorbiaceae Rehm (1897)
- Phyllachora euryae (Racib.) Arx & E. Müll. (1954)
- Phyllachora evernia Syd. (1931)
- Phyllachora exanthematica Lév. ex Cooke (1885)
- Phyllachora exasperans (Schwein.) Sacc. (1883)
- Phyllachora eximia Syd. & P. Syd. (1904)
- Phyllachora exostemae Chardón (1946)
- Phyllachora explanata (Lév.) Sacc. (1883)

== F ==
- Phyllachora fallax Sacc. (1876)
- Phyllachora fatiscens (Schwein. ex Berk. & M.A. Curtis) Sacc. (1883)
- Phyllachora feijoae Rehm (1897)
- Phyllachora fici-albae Koord. (1907)
- Phyllachora fici-asperrimae Anahosur (1969)
- Phyllachora ficicola Allesch. & Henn. (1897)
- Phyllachora fici-dekdekenae (Bacc.) E. Castell. & Cif. (1937)
- Phyllachora fici-fulvae Koord. (1907)
- Phyllachora fici-gibbosae Ullasa (1969)
- Phyllachora fici-heterophyllae Petr. (1929)
- Phyllachora fici-hispidae Seshadri (1968)
- Phyllachora fici-hochstetteri (Bacc.) E. Castell. & Cif. (1937)
- Phyllachora fici-minahassae Henn. (1908)
- Phyllachora fici-obscurae Koord. (1907)
- Phyllachora fici-orbispora C.A. Pearce & K.D. Hyde (2006)
- Phyllachora fici-variolosae Petr. (1947)
- Phyllachora fici-wightianae Sawada (1917)
- Phyllachora ficuum Niessl (1881)
- Phyllachora filicina Sacc. & Scalia (1904)
- Phyllachora filicum (Schwein.) Sacc. (1883)
- Phyllachora fimbristylidicola Speg. (1909)
- Phyllachora fimbristylidis (Berk. & Broome) Sacc. (1891)
- Phyllachora flabella (Schwein.) Thüm. (1875)
- Phyllachora flavocincta Rehm (1897)
- Phyllachora flemingiae T.S. Ramakr. & Sundaram (1955)
- Phyllachora fluminensis (Theiss.) Theiss. (1915)
- Phyllachora forsteroniae (Rehm) Petr. (1934)
- Phyllachora fraseriana Syd. (1938)
- Phyllachora freycinetiae F. Stevens (1925)
- Phyllachora frigoris (Schwein.) Sacc. (1883)
- Phyllachora fructicola Henn. (1897)
- Phyllachora fructigena (Schwein.) Sacc. (1883)
- Phyllachora furnasensis M.D.M. Santos, R.B. Medeiros & Dianese (2016)
- Phyllachora fuscescens (Speg.) Sacc. (1883)
- Phyllachora fusicarpa Seaver (1920)
- Phyllachora fusispora Chardón (1940)

== G ==
- Phyllachora gaylussaciae Henn. (1902)
- Phyllachora genipae F. Stevens & Dalbey (1919)
- Phyllachora gentianae (Schwein.) Sacc. (1883)
- Phyllachora gentilis Speg. (1891)
- Phyllachora glaziovii Henn. (1892)
- Phyllachora globispora Speg. (1909)
- Phyllachora glochidii Syd. & P. Syd. (1911)
- Phyllachora glochidiicola Seshadri (1966)
- Phyllachora gloriana C.A. Pearce, Reddell & K.D. Hyde (1999)
- Phyllachora glycinicola P.F. Cannon (1991)
- Phyllachora glycosmidis Petch (1917)
- Phyllachora goeppertiae Theiss. (1908)
- Phyllachora gomphandrae Hosag. (1995)
- Phyllachora gondarensis Ciccar. (1951)
- Phyllachora gorakhpurensis Y.N. Srivast. & Bhargava (1975)
- Phyllachora gordoniae Hosag. (1986)
- Phyllachora gouaniae Gonz. Frag. & Cif. (1926)
- Phyllachora gouaniae (F. Stevens) Petr. (1927)
- Phyllachora goyazensis Henn. (1895)
- Phyllachora gracillima Speg. (1889)
- Phyllachora graminis (Pers.) Fuckel (1870)
- Phyllachora grammica Henn. (1907)
- Phyllachora granulosa Sacc. (1883)
- Phyllachora gratissimae Rehm (1892)
- Phyllachora greciana Syd. (1926)
- Phyllachora grevilleae (Lév.) Sacc. (1883)
- Phyllachora grewiae (Kalchbr.) Theiss. & Syd. (1915)
- Phyllachora guaduae Chardón (1932)
- Phyllachora guanacastica P.F. Cannon (1991)
- Phyllachora guatteriae Berk. ex Cooke (1885)
- Phyllachora guavira Speg. (1888)
- Phyllachora guazumae Henn. (1908)
- Phyllachora gudalurensis T.S. Ramakr. & K. Ramakr. (1950)
- Phyllachora gymnemae Hosag. & Jac. Thomas (2010)
- Phyllachora gyneriicola Garcés (1944)
- Phyllachora gynoxidis (Pat.) Petr. (1927)

== H ==
- Phyllachora hainanensis Na Liu & G. Huang (2015)
- Phyllachora hakeicola C.A. Pearce & K.D. Hyde (1995)
- Phyllachora hauturu P.R. Johnst. & P.F. Cannon (2004)
- Phyllachora heimii Vienn.-Bourg. (1939)
- Phyllachora helvetica Fuckel (1870)
- Phyllachora hendrickxii Hansf. (1947)
- Phyllachora henningsii Sacc. & P. Syd. (1899)
- Phyllachora heraclei (Fr.) Fuckel (1870)
- Phyllachora heterocladae C.L. Yang, X.L. Xu & K.D. Hyde (2019)
- Phyllachora heteropteridis Henn. (1902)
- Phyllachora heterotrichi F. Stevens & Dalbey (1919)
- Phyllachora hibisci Rehm (1897)
- Phyllachora hibiscicola (Schwein.) Sacc. (1883)
- Phyllachora himalayana (Padwick) Kamat, Seshadri & A. Pande (1978)
- Phyllachora howardiana Petr. (1929)
- Phyllachora hoyosensis Petr. (1955)
- Phyllachora huallagensis Henn. (1904)
- Phyllachora huberi Henn. (1900)
- Phyllachora hugoniae Theiss. & Syd. (1915)
- Phyllachora huigraensis Chardón (1932)
- Phyllachora hyssopi (Schwein.) Sacc. (1883)

== I ==
- Phyllachora icacoreae F. Stevens (1927)
- Phyllachora idahoensis Petr. (1958)
- Phyllachora impatientis (Schwein.) Sacc. (1883)
- Phyllachora incarcerata (Berk.) Sacc. (1883)
- Phyllachora inclusa (Berk. & M.A. Curtis) Sacc. (1883)
- Phyllachora inconspicua Chardón (1927)
- Phyllachora incrustans (Racib.) Petr. (1929)
- Phyllachora indica Theiss. & Syd. (1915)
- Phyllachora inelegans (Schwein.) Sacc. (1883)
- Phyllachora infectoria Cooke (1885)
- Phyllachora infesta Theiss. & Syd. (1915)
- Phyllachora infuscans G. Winter (1887)
- Phyllachora ingicola Syd. (1926)
- Phyllachora inimica (Theiss. & Syd.) Petr. (1929)
- Phyllachora interstitialis Berk. & M.A. Curtis ex Cooke (1885)
- Phyllachora ipirangae Speg. (1908)
- Phyllachora irregularis (Welw. & Curr.) A.L. Sm. (1898)
- Phyllachora isachnicola X.L. Li & C.Y. Li (2018)
- Phyllachora ischaemi Syd. & P. Syd. (1915)
- Phyllachora isonandrae Hosag., Manian, Vasuki & Somasund. (1993)
- Phyllachora ixorae Theiss. & Syd. (1915)

== J ==
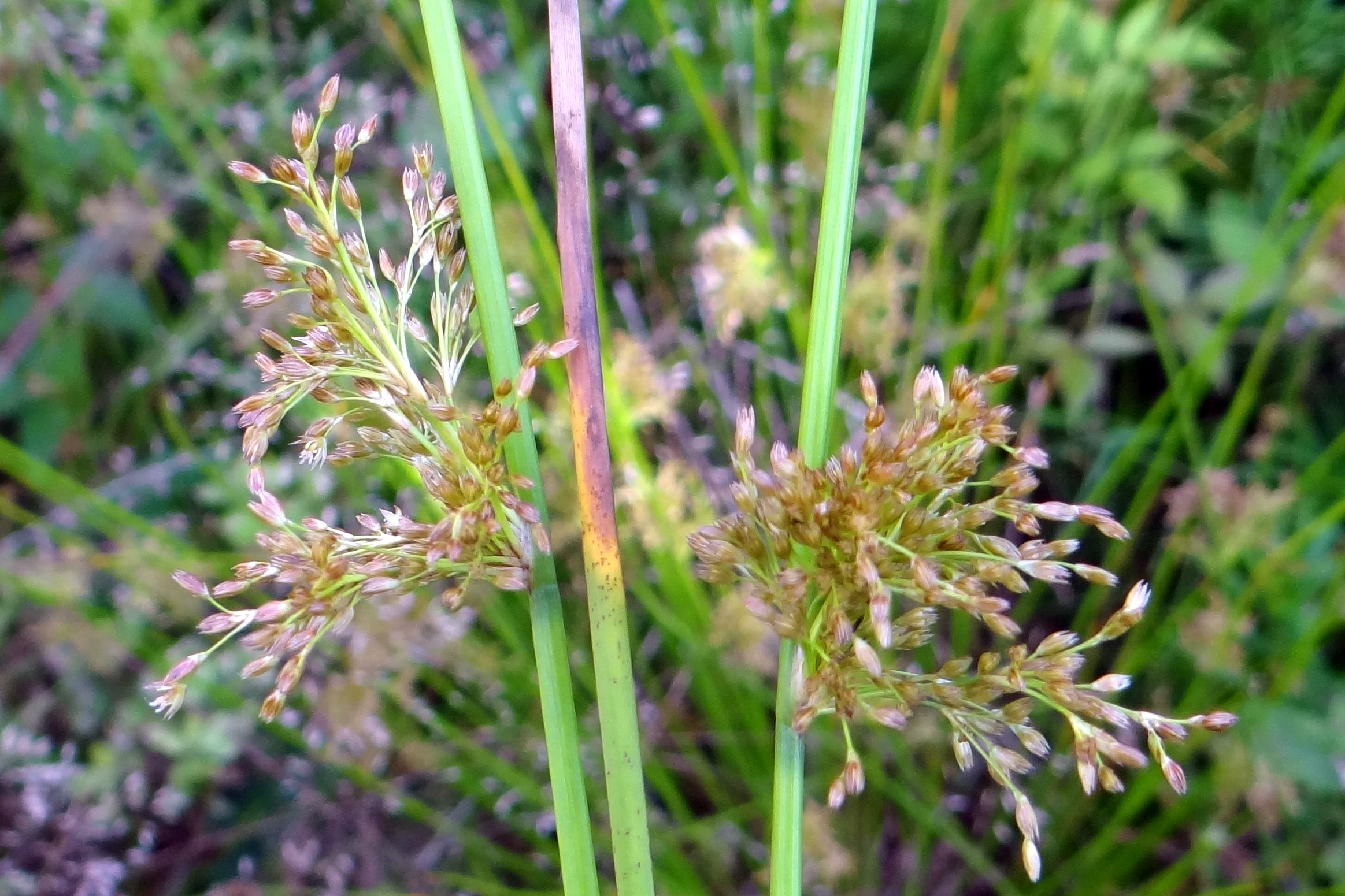
Phyllachora junci on Juncus sp.

- Phyllachora jacarandae Bat. (1949)
- Phyllachora japonica Cooke & Massee (1890)
- Phyllachora javanica (Koord.) Petr. (1931)
- Phyllachora jianfengensis Na Liu & M.Z. Li (2016)
- Phyllachora juglandicola (Schwein.) Sacc. (1883)
- Phyllachora julocrotonis Bres. (1896)
- Phyllachora junci (Alb. & Schwein.) Fuckel (1870)
- Phyllachora juruensis Henn. (1904)

== K ==
- Phyllachora kaernbachii Henn. (1894)
- Phyllachora kamalii Seshadri (1968)
- Phyllachora kambakkamensis K. Ramakr. (1953)
- Phyllachora kanarensis T.S. Ramakr. & Sundaram (1954)
- Phyllachora kanyakumariana Hosag. (1995)
- Phyllachora karwarensis Seshadri (1966)
- Phyllachora kellermanii (Rehm) Arx & E. Müll. (1954)
- Phyllachora keralensis Hosag., Manian & Vasuki (1989)
- Phyllachora kerniana Chardón (1927)
- Phyllachora klotzschiani Hosag., Rajendran & P. Daniel (1989)
- Phyllachora kniphofiae (Kalchbr. & Cooke) Sacc. (1883)
- Phyllachora koondrookensis Parbery (1967)
- Phyllachora kwangtungensis Petr. (1955)
- Phyllachora kylei C.A. Pearce, Reddell & K.D. Hyde (2001)
- Phyllachora kyllingae Chardón (1932)

== L ==
- Phyllachora lacrimiformis Ullasa (1969)
- Phyllachora lactea Theiss. & Syd. (1915)
- Phyllachora laeviuscula Speg. (1891)
- Phyllachora lagerheimiana Rehm (1891)
- Phyllachora lagunensis Syd. & P. Syd. (1913)
- Phyllachora lamprothea Petr. (1929)
- Phyllachora lapponica Petr. (1936)
- Phyllachora lasiacis Syd. (1925)
- Phyllachora lauracearum (Henn.) Höhn. (1910)
- Phyllachora lauricola (Schwein.) Sacc. (1883)
- Phyllachora laurinearum Racib. (1900)
- Phyllachora leeae-elatae A.K. Kar & Maity (1971)
- Phyllachora leeicola Ananthan. (1964)
- Phyllachora leersiae Chardón (1932)
- Phyllachora lehmanniana Henn. (1897)
- Phyllachora leopoldensis Theiss. & Syd. (1915)
- Phyllachora lepida Syd. & P. Syd. (1910)
- Phyllachora leptasca Syd. (1926)
- Phyllachora leptocarydii Syd. (1924)
- Phyllachora leptochloae Chardón (1932)
- Phyllachora leptoderridis Deighton (1952)
- Phyllachora leptospermi (Cooke) Höhn. (1910)
- Phyllachora leptostromoidea Cooke (1885)
- Phyllachora leptotheca Theiss. & Syd. (1915)
- Phyllachora lespedezae (Schwein.) Sacc. (1883)
- Phyllachora leucospila Syd. (1939)
- Phyllachora leveilleana Theiss. & Syd. (1917)
- Phyllachora liebenbergii Hansf. (1941)
- Phyllachora lindmanii Starbäck (1905)
- Phyllachora lineola (Schwein.) Sacc. (1883)
- Phyllachora liniae C.A. Pearce & K.D. Hyde (2006)
- Phyllachora litseae Koord. (1907)
- Phyllachora litseicola Seshadri (1966)
- Phyllachora lonchotheca Speg. (1881)
- Phyllachora longinaviculata Parbery (1967)
- Phyllachora loudetiae Doidge (1942)
- Phyllachora lucida Sacc. & Paol. (1888)
- Phyllachora lundiae Chardón (1940)
- Phyllachora lunulata Chardón (1934)
- Phyllachora luteomaculata (Schwein.) Orton (1918)
- Phyllachora luzulae (Rabenh.) Cooke (1885)
- Phyllachora lyonsiae Syd. (1937)

== M ==
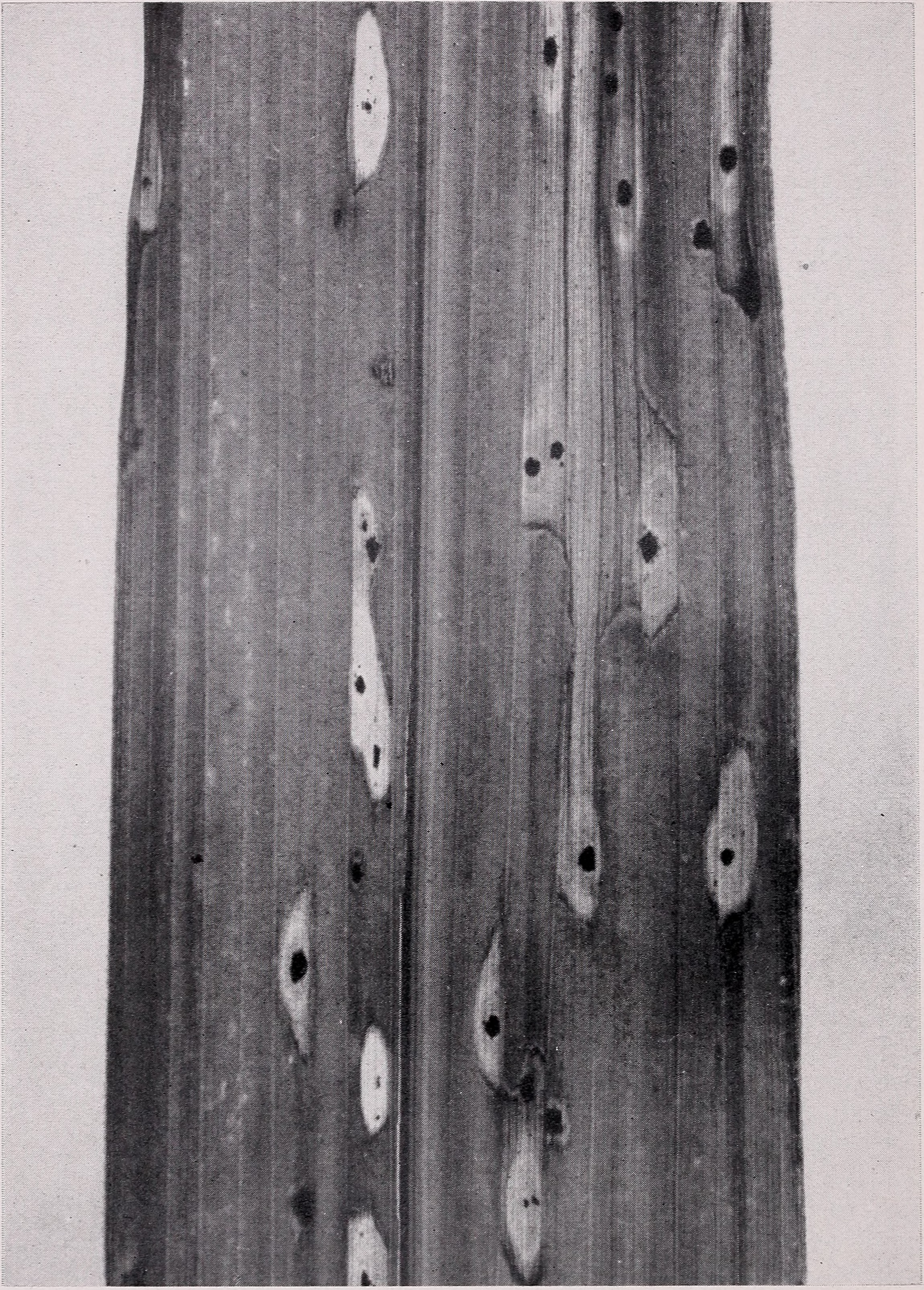
Image from Thomas Theis's 1953 book 'Forage plants Diseases and pests Puerto Rico' showing Tar spot on Paspalum virgatum (talquezal) caused by Phyllachora cornispora (now called Phyllachora minutissima

- Phyllachora mabae (Henn.) Theiss. & Syd. (1915)
- Phyllachora mabeicola Chardón (1940)
- Phyllachora macarangae Henn. (1908)
- Phyllachora machaeriicola (Henn.) Theiss. & Syd. (1915)
- Phyllachora macroloculata (Chardón) Cif. (1954)
- Phyllachora macrospora Zimm. (1902)
- Phyllachora maculans (Schwein.) Sacc. (1883)
- Phyllachora maculans (Mont.) Cooke (1885)
- Phyllachora macularum Petr. & Cif. (1932)
- Phyllachora maculata Cooke (1891)
- Phyllachora maculicola Syd. & P. Syd. (1916)
- Phyllachora madeirensis Henn. (1904)
- Phyllachora madhucae R.C. Rajak & Hasija (1978)
- Phyllachora magnificens Chardón (1940)
- Phyllachora malabarensis Syd., P. Syd. & E.J. Butler (1911)
- Phyllachora malloti T.S. Ramakr. (1957)
- Phyllachora malloticola Seshadri (1969)
- Phyllachora malvavisci Syd. (1925)
- Phyllachora manaosensis Henn. (1904)
- Phyllachora manuka P.R. Johnst. & P.F. Cannon (2004)
- Phyllachora maprouneae Henn. (1904)
- Phyllachora maquilingensis Syd. & P. Syd. (1920)
- Phyllachora marginalis Pat. (1892)
- Phyllachora massinii Toro (1926)
- Phyllachora mauriae Syd. (1925)
- Phyllachora maydis Maubl. (1904)
- Phyllachora mayepeae F. Stevens & Dalbey (1919)
- Phyllachora mayorii Chardón (1928)
- Phyllachora medellinensis (Chardón) Petr. (1940)
- Phyllachora megalospora Speg. (1898)
- Phyllachora megastroma Pat. (1914)
- Phyllachora meibomiae F. Stevens (1927)
- Phyllachora melaleucae Syd. & P. Syd. (1904)
- Phyllachora melanoplaca (Desm.) Sacc. (1883)
- Phyllachora melaspilea Syd. (1937)
- Phyllachora melastomacearum Racib. (1915)
- Phyllachora melastomatis (Kunze ex Fr.) Sacc. (1883)
- Phyllachora melastomatis-candidae Sawada (1942)
- Phyllachora melatephra Syd. (1932)
- Phyllachora meliae Pat. (1913)
- Phyllachora melianthi (Thüm.) Sacc. (1883)
- Phyllachora melicicola Speg. (1909)
- Phyllachora meliosmae Racib. (1915)
- Phyllachora menispermi Speg. (1888)
- Phyllachora menothea Syd. (1928)
- Phyllachora meridensis Chardón (1934)
- Phyllachora merrillii Ricker (1906)
- Phyllachora metastelmae F. Stevens & Dalbey (1919)
- Phyllachora michelii Speg. (1888)
- Phyllachora miconiicola Speg. (1918)
- Phyllachora miconiiphila J.L. Alves, R.W. Barreto & O.L. Pereira (2010)
- Phyllachora microcenta (Berk. & Broome) Sacc. (1883)
- Phyllachora microchita Syd. (1926)
- Phyllachora micropeltoidea Petr. (1955)
- Phyllachora microsperma Parbery (1967)
- Phyllachora microspora Chardón (1928)
- Phyllachora microstegia Syd. (1924)
- Phyllachora microstroma Chardón (1928)
- Phyllachora microtheles (Speg.) Chardón (1930)
- Phyllachora millettiae Henn. (1900)
- Phyllachora mindoensis Syd. (1939)
- Phyllachora minuta Henn. (1902)
- Phyllachora minutissima (Welw. & Curr.) A.L. Sm. (1898)
- Phyllachora mirandina Chardón (1934)
- Phyllachora miryensis Henn. (1904)
- Phyllachora miscanthi Syd. & P. Syd. (1917)
- Phyllachora miscanthidii Doidge (1942)
- Phyllachora missouriensis (Schwein.) Sacc. (1883)
- Phyllachora monanthochloes Petr. (1955)
- Phyllachora monensis Chardón ex P.F. Cannon (1991)
- Phyllachora monninae Syd. & P. Syd. (1904)
- Phyllachora montserratis (Chardón) Petr. (1940)
- Phyllachora mouriri Syd. & P. Syd. (1916)
- Phyllachora muhlenbergiae (Ellis) Sacc. (1883)
- Phyllachora mulleri Chardón (1940)
- Phyllachora musae (Klotzsch) Sacc. (1883)
- Phyllachora musicola C. Booth & D.E. Shaw (1961)
- Phyllachora mutisiae Speg. (1902)
- Phyllachora myrciae-rostratae Viégas (1944)
- Phyllachora myrrhinii Theiss. (1910)
- Phyllachora myrsinicola Doidge (1922)
- Phyllachora myrtincola (Rehm) Petr. (1941)
- Phyllachora mysorensis Seshadri (1966)

== N ==
- Phyllachora naqsii K.D. Hyde & C.A. Pearce (1993)
- Phyllachora nectandrae F. Stevens & Dalbey (1919)
- Phyllachora nectandricola Speg. (1909)
- Phyllachora negeriana Henn. & Lindau (1897)
- Phyllachora neolitseae Sivan. & R.G. Shivas (2002)
- Phyllachora nepenthidis Racib. (1915)
- Phyllachora nervicida Speg. (1918)
- Phyllachora nervisequens (Lingelsh.) Petr. (1929)
- Phyllachora neurophila Syd. (1939)
- Phyllachora nidulans Pat. (1891)
- Phyllachora nigerrima (Viégas) M.D.M. Santos, R.B. Medeiros & Dianese (2016)
- Phyllachora nigrescens (Schwein.) Sacc. (1883)
- Phyllachora nitens (Lév.) Cooke (1885)
- Phyllachora nitidissima (Berk. & M.A. Curtis) Sacc. (1883)
- Phyllachora njalensis P.F. Cannon (1991)
- Phyllachora noackii Syd. & P. Syd. (1907)
- Phyllachora noblei Chardón (1932)
- Phyllachora nodicola (Schwein.) Sacc. (1883)
- Phyllachora notabilis Petr. & Cif. (1930)
- Phyllachora novoguineensis (Theiss. & Syd.) Petr. (1929)
- Phyllachora nuttalliana Fairm. (1923)

== O ==
- Phyllachora oblongispora Syd. & P. Syd. (1913)
- Phyllachora oblongospora Parbery (1971)
- Phyllachora occultans P.F. Cannon & H.C. Evans (1999)
- Phyllachora ochnacearum Bat. & J.L. Bezerra (1964)
- Phyllachora ochnae Pat. & Har. (1912)
- Phyllachora ocoteae Henn. (1904)
- Phyllachora ocoteicola F. Stevens & Dalbey (1919)
- Phyllachora olivascens (Rehm) Arx & E. Müll. (1954)
- Phyllachora olyrae Rehm (1897)
- Phyllachora opaca Speg. (1885)
- Phyllachora opiferae Bat. & Peres (1964)
- Phyllachora opposita Henn. (1904)
- Phyllachora orbicula Rehm (1914)
- Phyllachora orbicularis Speg. (1921)
- Phyllachora orbiculata (Schwein.) Sacc. (1883)
- Phyllachora orbis (Berk. & Broome) Cooke (1885)
- Phyllachora oreodaphnes (Theiss.) Theiss. & Syd. (1915)
- Phyllachora ornans (Schwein.) Sacc. (1883)
- Phyllachora oryzopsidis Theiss. & Syd. (1915)
- Phyllachora ospinae Chardón (1930)
- Phyllachora oxyspora Starbäck (1899)
- Phyllachora oyedaeae Chardón (1934)

== P ==
- Phyllachora paludicola Kohlm. & Volkm.-Kohlm. (2003)
- Phyllachora panamensis F. Stevens (1927)
- Phyllachora panici (Schwein.) Sacc. (1883)
- Phyllachora panicicola Dayar. & K.D. Hyde (2017)
- Phyllachora pappiana Bacc. (1907)
- Phyllachora paraguaya Speg. (1885)
- Phyllachora paralabatiae Petr. & Cif. (1930)
- Phyllachora paramo-nigra Chardón (1934)
- Phyllachora parberyi Kamat & A. Pande (1974)
- Phyllachora parvicapsa (Cooke) Theiss. & Syd. (1915)
- Phyllachora parvula Speg. (1908)
- Phyllachora paspalicola Henn. (1908)
- Phyllachora paulliniae Petr. (1955)
- Phyllachora peglerae (Doidge) Doidge (1942)
- Phyllachora peltaticola O.L. Pereira & R.W. Barreto (2006)
- Phyllachora penicillata (Schwein.) Sacc. (1883)
- Phyllachora pennellii Seaver (1928)
- Phyllachora pennisetina Syd. (1922)
- Phyllachora peregrina Syd. (1925)
- Phyllachora perforans (Rehm) Sacc. & P. Syd. (1902)
- Phyllachora perisporioides Sacc. (1891)
- Phyllachora perlata Syd. & P. Syd. (1914)
- Phyllachora permeans (Berk. & M.A. Curtis) Sacc. (1883)
- Phyllachora permixta Syd. & P. Syd. (1911)
- Phyllachora permutata Petr. (1927)
- Phyllachora pernettyae Syd. (1939)
- Phyllachora perotidis Doidge (1942)
- Phyllachora perplexans Chardón (1932)
- Phyllachora perseae Hodges (1969)
- Phyllachora perversa (Rehm) Theiss. & Syd. (1915)
- Phyllachora pestis-nigra Speg. (1885)
- Phyllachora petitmenginii Maire (1908)
- Phyllachora phanerae Racib. (1915)
- Phyllachora phlogis (Schwein.) Sacc. (1883)
- Phyllachora phoebes Syd. (1926)
- Phyllachora phoebicola Speg. (1912)
- Phyllachora phyllanthophila Henn. (1904)
- Phyllachora phylloplaca (Kunze ex Mont.) Sacc. (1883)
- Phyllachora phyllostachydis Hara (1913)
- Phyllachora physocarpi Jacz. (1899)
- Phyllachora phytolaccae (Schwein.) Sacc. (1883)
- Phyllachora picea (Berk. & M.A. Curtis) Sacc. (1883)
- Phyllachora picramniae F. Stevens (1927)
- Phyllachora piperacearum Speg. (1888)
- Phyllachora pipericola Chardón (1934)
- Phyllachora piptadeniicola Speg. (1912)
- Phyllachora piptocarphae Petr. (1948)
- Phyllachora pittieri Theiss. & Syd. (1915)
- Phyllachora pittospori Henn. (1893)
- Phyllachora placida (Syd. & P. Syd.) Theiss. (1917)
- Phyllachora plantaginis Ellis & Everh. (1895)
- Phyllachora platyelliptica Parbery (1967)
- Phyllachora pogonatheri Syd. & P. Syd. (1915)
- Phyllachora polemonii Harkn. (1887)
- Phyllachora polygalae (Schwein.) Sacc. (1883)
- Phyllachora polygonati (Schwein.) Sacc. (1883)
- Phyllachora polypogonis Theiss. & Syd. (1915)
- Phyllachora polytocae Parbery (1967)
- Phyllachora poonensis Seshadri (1968)
- Phyllachora populi Richon (1889)
- Phyllachora portoricensis (F. Stevens) Petr. (1931)
- Phyllachora potentillae Peck (1929)
- Phyllachora pouteriae Bat. & Peres (1967)
- Phyllachora prataprajii Hosag. (1988)
- Phyllachora premnae Syd. & P. Syd. (1914)
- Phyllachora pressa Syd. (1939)
- Phyllachora pretoriae Doidge (1942)
- Phyllachora pseudes Rehm (1913)
- Phyllachora pseudostromatica Arx & E. Müll. (1954)
- Phyllachora psychotriae Rehm (1897)
- Phyllachora pterocarpi Syd. & P. Syd. (1912)
- Phyllachora pterolobii (T.S. Ramakr. & K. Ramakr.) Arx & E. Müll. (1954)
- Phyllachora pterospermi Syd. & P. Syd. (1917)
- Phyllachora pulchra Speg. (1885)
- Phyllachora puncta (Cooke) Cooke (1885)
- Phyllachora punctifaciens Petr. (1934)
- Phyllachora punctiformis (Fuckel) Fuckel (1870)
- Phyllachora pusilla Syd. & P. Syd. (1904)
- Phyllachora pycrei Syd. & P. Syd. (1917)
- Phyllachora pygei M.S. Patil & Thite (1974)

== Q ==
- Phyllachora quadrospora Tehon (1919)
- Phyllachora qualeae (Viégas) Bat. & Peres (1967)
- Phyllachora queenslandica Hansf. (1956)
- Phyllachora quercus A.K. Kar & S.K. Gupta (1981)

== R ==
- Phyllachora ramamurthyi Hosag., Manian & Pandur. (1993)
- Phyllachora ramicola R.K. Verma, N. Sharma & Soni (2008)
- Phyllachora ramonensis Syd. (1925)
- Phyllachora ramosa (Schwein.) Sacc. (1883)
- Phyllachora ramosii (Henn.) Theiss. & Syd. (1915)
- Phyllachora randiae Rehm (1897)
- Phyllachora rapaneicola Garcés (1941)
- Phyllachora ravenalae Pat. & Har. (1912)
- Phyllachora reducta Höhn. (1932)
- Phyllachora renealmiae Rehm (1897)
- Phyllachora repens (Berk.) Sacc. (1883)
- Phyllachora reticulata P.F. Cannon & H.C. Evans (1999)
- Phyllachora rhamni T.S. Ramakr. (1951)
- Phyllachora rhois (Schwein.) Sacc. (1883)
- Phyllachora rhopographoides G. Winter (1887)
- Phyllachora rhynchosporae Chardón (1929)
- Phyllachora rhytismoides (Corda) Sacc. (1883)
- Phyllachora rickiana Theiss. (1918)
- Phyllachora rickseckeri Ellis & Kelsey ex Seaver (1925)
- Phyllachora rimulosa Speg. (1918)
- Phyllachora rostellispora Parbery (1967)
- Phyllachora rostkoviae P.R. Johnst. & P.F. Cannon (2004)
- Phyllachora roupalae Rehm (1900)
- Phyllachora roupalina (Mont.) Sacc. (1883)
- Phyllachora roureae Syd. & P. Syd. (1913)
- Phyllachora rouxii (Mont.) E. Müll. (1962)
- Phyllachora rubefaciens Rehm (1900)
- Phyllachora rubiginosae C.A. Pearce & K.D. Hyde (2006)
- Phyllachora rudgeae Syd. & P. Syd. (1901)
- Phyllachora ruizii Chardón (1934)
- Phyllachora ruprechtiae Speg. (1885)

== S ==
- Phyllachora saccardoana Petr. & Syd. (1925)
- Phyllachora sacchari Henn. (1902)
- Phyllachora sacchari-spontanei Syd. & P. Syd. (1913)
- Phyllachora sageretiae C.A. Pearce, K.D. Hyde & R.G. Shivas (1995)
- Phyllachora sagreana Petr. & Cif. (1940)
- Phyllachora salaciae (Henn.) Höhn. (1910)
- Phyllachora samanensis Petr. & Cif. (1932)
- Phyllachora sancta Petr. & Cif. (1932)
- Phyllachora sarcomphali Cif. (1957)
- Phyllachora sasae I. Hino & Katum. (1961)
- Phyllachora sassafras (Schwein.) Sacc. (1883)
- Phyllachora scabies (Kalchbr. & Cooke) Cooke (1885)
- Phyllachora scanica Starbäck (1895)
- Phyllachora scapincola (Schwein.) Sacc. (1883)
- Phyllachora schimae Chi Y. Chen & W.H. Hsieh (1996)
- Phyllachora schizolobiicola Henn. (1902)
- Phyllachora schoenicola Syd. & P. Syd. (1913)
- Phyllachora schotiae (Doidge) Doidge (1942)
- Phyllachora schweinfurthii Henn. (1891)
- Phyllachora scirpi Feltgen (1901)
- Phyllachora scleriae Rehm (1900)
- Phyllachora scleriicola Miles (1926)
- Phyllachora secunda Höhn. (1920)
- Phyllachora securidacae Henn. (1904)
- Phyllachora selenospora Speg. (1889)
- Phyllachora sesseae Syd. (1939)
- Phyllachora setariicola Speg. (1885)
- Phyllachora shettyi Hosag. (1988)
- Phyllachora shiraiana P. Syd. (1898)
- Phyllachora shivasii C.A. Pearce & K.D. Hyde (1995)
- Phyllachora sideroxyli (Gonz. Frag. & Cif.) Petr. (1931)
- Phyllachora sikkimensis T.S. Ramakr. & K. Ramakr. (1950)
- Phyllachora silphii (Schwein.) Sacc. (1883)
- Phyllachora simabae-cedronis Henn. (1904)
- Phyllachora simabicola Petr. (1947)
- Phyllachora simplex Starbäck (1905)
- Phyllachora sinensis Sacc. (1921)
- Phyllachora sinik-lagaraik Speg. (1885)
- Phyllachora sintenisii Petr. & Cif. (1932)
- Phyllachora smilacicola Chardón (1926)
- Phyllachora smilacis Gonz. Frag. ex Trotter (1926)
- Phyllachora socia Henn. (1904)
- Phyllachora solidaginum (Schwein.) Sacc. (1883)
- Phyllachora sordida Speg. (1889)
- Phyllachora sororcula Speg. (1888)
- Phyllachora spatholobi Syd. (1935)
- Phyllachora spegazzinii Sacc. & P. Syd. (1899)
- Phyllachora sphaerocaryi X.L. Li & C.Y. Li (2018)
- Phyllachora sphaerosperma G. Winter (1884)
- Phyllachora sphaerospora Pat. (1887)
- Phyllachora spissa Syd. & P. Syd. (1911)
- Phyllachora sporoboli Pat. (1903)
- Phyllachora stearnii K.D. Hyde & P.F. Cannon (1999)
- Phyllachora stena Syd. (1925)
- Phyllachora stenocarpa Syd. (1926)
- Phyllachora stenospora (Berk. & Broome) Sacc. (1883)
- Phyllachora stephaniae (Racib.) Racib. ex Theiss. & Syd. (1915)
- Phyllachora stevensii Syd. ex F. Stevens (1927)
- Phyllachora stewartii Negru & I. Popescu (1966)
- Phyllachora stigmodes Syd. (1939)
- Phyllachora stipata (Fr.) Sacc. (1883)
- Phyllachora strelitziae (Cooke) Sacc. (1883)
- Phyllachora subbrachyspora Speg. (1918)
- Phyllachora subcuticularis (Schwein.) Sacc. (1883)
- Phyllachora subopaca Rehm (1897)
- Phyllachora subtropica Speg. (1891)
- Phyllachora swartziae P.F. Cannon (1991)
- Phyllachora swieteniae Petr. & Cif. (1932)
- Phyllachora sycomori (Bacc.) E. Castell. & Cif. (1937)
- Phyllachora sydowii P.F. Cannon (1991)
- Phyllachora sylvatica Sacc. & Speg. (1878)

== T ==
- Phyllachora tabebuiae (Rehm) Theiss. & Syd. (1915)
- Phyllachora tabernaemontanae F. Stevens (1924)
- Phyllachora tachirensis Chardón (1934)
- Phyllachora tamoyae Viégas (1944)
- Phyllachora tandonii Mitter (1935)
- Phyllachora tanensis P.F. Cannon & H.C. Evans (1999)
- Phyllachora tapirirae Viégas (1944)
- Phyllachora taruma Speg. (1885)
- Phyllachora tecleae Doidge (1922)
- Phyllachora tehonis Trotter (1926)
- Phyllachora teneriffae Petr. (1948)
- Phyllachora tengchongensis Na Liu & L. Guo (2007)
- Phyllachora tenuis (Berk. & M.A. Curtis) Sacc. (1883)
- Phyllachora tephrosiae Syd. (1924)
- Phyllachora terminaliae T.S. Ramakr. (1957)
- Phyllachora tessariae Petr. (1950)
- Phyllachora tetrantherae (Berk. & Broome) Sacc. (1883)
- Phyllachora tetrasperma Sawada (1952)
- Phyllachora tetraspora Chardón (1932)
- Phyllachora thanatophora (Lév.) Sacc. (1883)
- Phyllachora themedae Ananthan. (1964)
- Phyllachora therophila (Desm.) Arx & E. Müll. (1954)
- Phyllachora thiruvananthapurica Hosag. & T.K. Abraham (1997)
- Phyllachora thwaitesii (Berk.) Sacc. (1883)
- Phyllachora thysanolaenae Tamakaew, Maharachch., K.D. Hyde & Cheew. (2017)
- Phyllachora tijucensis (Rehm) Theiss. & Syd. (1915)
- Phyllachora tiliae F. Stevens (1924)
- Phyllachora tipae Speg. (1898)
- Phyllachora tirolensis Petr. (1947)
- Phyllachora tjangkorreh Racib. (1900)
- Phyllachora tjapukaiensis C.A. Pearce, Reddell & K.D. Hyde (2001)
- Phyllachora tonduzii E. Bommer & M. Rousseau (1896)
- Phyllachora tonkinensis Sacc. & P. Syd. (1899)
- Phyllachora toroi Chardón (1930)
- Phyllachora torrubiae Chardón (1932)
- Phyllachora tragiae (Schwein.) Sacc. (1883)
- Phyllachora travancorica T.S. Ramakr. (1956)
- Phyllachora tricholaenae Henn. (1897)
- Phyllachora tricuspidis Speg. (1888)
- Phyllachora tripsacina Petr. & Cif. (1932)
- Phyllachora tritici-gracilis (Castagne) Sacc. (1883)
- Phyllachora triumfettae Pat. (1892)
- Phyllachora trivialis Speg. (1889)
- Phyllachora trophis F. Stevens (1927)
- Phyllachora tropicalis Speg. (1880)
- Phyllachora trujillensis Chardón (1934)
- Phyllachora truncatispora (Viégas) Bat. & H. Maia (1967)
- Phyllachora tumatumariana P.F. Cannon (1991)
- Phyllachora tupi Viégas & Teixeira (1945)

== U ==
- Phyllachora uberata Sacc. (1913)
- Phyllachora ugandensis Syd. (1937)
- Phyllachora ulcerata Massee (1899)
- Phyllachora umbilicata Theiss. & Syd. (1915)
- Phyllachora uppalii K. Ramakr. & Subram. (1956)
- Phyllachora urbaniana Allesch. & Henn. (1897)
- Phyllachora urophylla Höhn. (1912)
- Phyllachora urvilleana Speg. (1909)
- Phyllachora usteriana Speg. (1908)
- Phyllachora ustulata (Cooke) Höhn. (1910)

== V ==
- Phyllachora vallecaucana Chardón (1930)
- Phyllachora valsiformis Rehm (1913)
- Phyllachora valsispora Rehm (1897)
- Phyllachora velatispora C.A. Pearce & K.D. Hyde (1994)
- Phyllachora ventilaginis T.S. Ramakr. & Sundaram (1954)
- Phyllachora veraguensis Syd. (1926)
- Phyllachora verbesinae (Pat. & Gaillard) Petr. (1927)
- Phyllachora vernicosa Speg. (1908)
- Phyllachora vernoniae Bat. & J.L. Bezerra (1964)
- Phyllachora vernoniicola Henn. (1902)
- Phyllachora verrucosa Chardón (1932)
- Phyllachora vesicata Cooke (1885)
- Phyllachora vetiveriicola S. Ahmad (1971)
- Phyllachora victoriensis C.A. Pearce & K.D. Hyde (1995)
- Phyllachora viequesensis Orton & Toro (1926)
- Phyllachora vilis Starbäck (1905)
- Phyllachora vinosa Speg. (1889)
- Phyllachora viridulocincta Rehm (1897)
- Phyllachora vismiae F. Stevens (1927)
- Phyllachora viticicola Henn. (1904)
- Phyllachora viticola (Schwein.) Sacc. (1883)
- Phyllachora vitis M.S. Patil & A.B. Pawar (1987)
- Phyllachora viventis (Cooke) Sacc. (1883)
- Phyllachora vochysiae Henn. (1905)
- Phyllachora vossiae Syd. & P. Syd. (1904)
- Phyllachora vulgata Theiss. & Syd. (1915)

== W ==
- Phyllachora weirii (Chardón) P.F. Cannon (1991)
- Phyllachora whetzelii Chardón (1921)
- Phyllachora wightianae Sawada (1917)
- Phyllachora winteri Sacc. & P. Syd. (1899)
- Phyllachora wismarensis F. Stevens (1924)
- Phyllachora woodiana Doidge (1942)
- Phyllachora wrightiana Speg. (1921)

== X Y Z ==
- Phyllachora xanthii (DC.) Sacc. (1883)
- Phyllachora xylopiae (Henn.) Theiss. & Syd. (1915)
- Phyllachora xylosmatis Speg. (1912)
- Phyllachora xylostei (Fr.) Fuckel (1870)
- Phyllachora yapensis (Henn.) Syd. & P. Syd. (1913)
- Phyllachora yassensis Petr. (1954)
- Phyllachora yatesii E. Castell. & Cif. (1937)
- Phyllachora yunnanensis Na Liu & L. Guo (2006)
- Phyllachora zanthoxyli (Lév.) Cooke (1885)
- Phyllachora zygopetali Rangel (1926)
