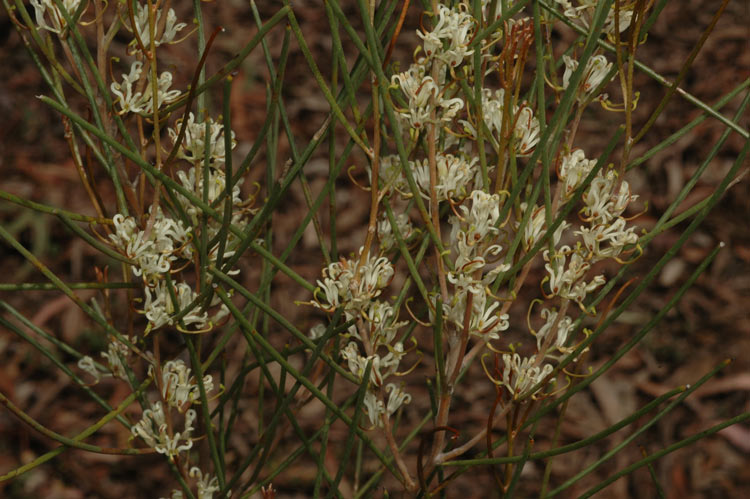
- Hakea adnata in the ANBG

Scientific classification
- Kingdom: Plantae
- Clade: Tracheophytes
- Clade: Angiosperms
- Clade: Eudicots
- Order: Proteales
- Family: Proteaceae
- Genus: Hakea
- Species: H. adnata

Binomial name
- Hakea adnata R.Br.
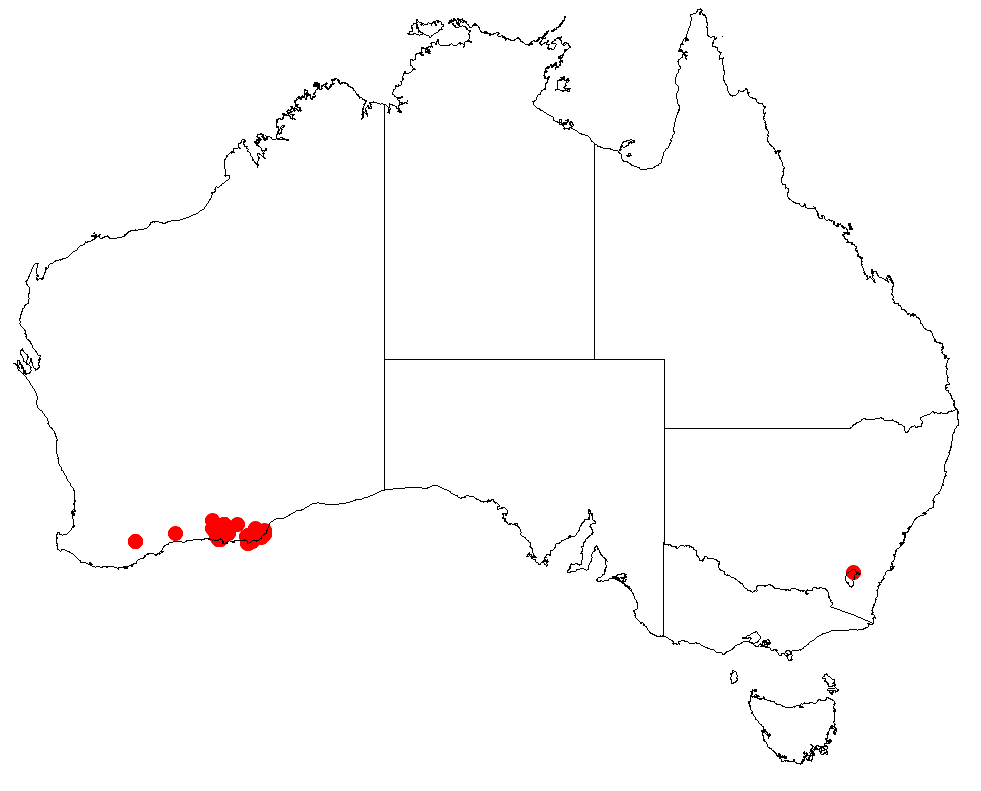
- Occurrence data from Australasian Virtual Herbarium

= Hakea adnata =

Species of shrub native to Western Australia

Hakea adnata is a shrub in the family Proteaceae native to the south coast of Western Australia. It is a multi-stemmed shrub that produces masses of white scented flowers from late winter to spring.

== Description ==
Hakea adnata is non lignotuberous upright broom-like shrub 1 to 3.5 metres (3 to 11 ft) high. Smaller branches and new growth are a rusty colour. Dark green leaves are needle-like straight or with a slight curve 2.5–13 cm (1–5 in) long and 1 to 1.5 millimetres (0.039 to 0.059 in) wide ending with a slight hook at the apex. Each inflorescence has 2-6 sweetly scented white flowers in leaf axils. The pedicel is 2–2.5 mm (0.08–0.1 in) long with flat dense silky white hairs extending onto lower parts of the flower. The perianth is 4.5–5.5 mm (0.2–0.2 in) long and the style 7.5–10 mm (0.3–0.4 in) long. The large fruit are erect or slanted to the stalk, egg-shaped 2.5 to 3.8 cm (1.0 to 1.5 in) long and 2 to 3 cm (0.8 to 1.2 in) wide. Fruit have a smooth to slightly rough surface with a short upturned beak. The seed are 1.6 to 2.3 cm (0.6 to 0.9 in) long. Flowers from July to October.

== Taxonomy and naming ==
Hakea adnata was first formally described by the botanist Robert Brown in 1830 and the description was published in Supplementum primum Prodromi florae Novae Hollandiae. The only known synonym is Hakea lativalvis. The specific epithet (adnata) is derived from Latin meaning "united with" the significance of which is unknown, as there is no reference to it in the original description.

== Distribution ==
Hakea adnata has a scattered distribution along the south coast in the Goldfields-Esperance region of Western Australia with the bulk of the population found between Norseman, Esperance and Cape Arid National Park. Hakea adnata is found on flats and around salt lakes where it grows in sandy clay and gravelly sandy soils as a part of Banksia speciosa heathland or shrub mallee communities.
