= P. phyllostachydis =

P. phyllostachydis may refer to:

- Phyllachora phyllostachydis, a fungus species
- Polyporus phyllostachydis, a fungus species growing on dead bamboo shoots
- Puccinia phyllostachydis, Kusano, the bamboo rust, a fungus species of the genus Puccinia
