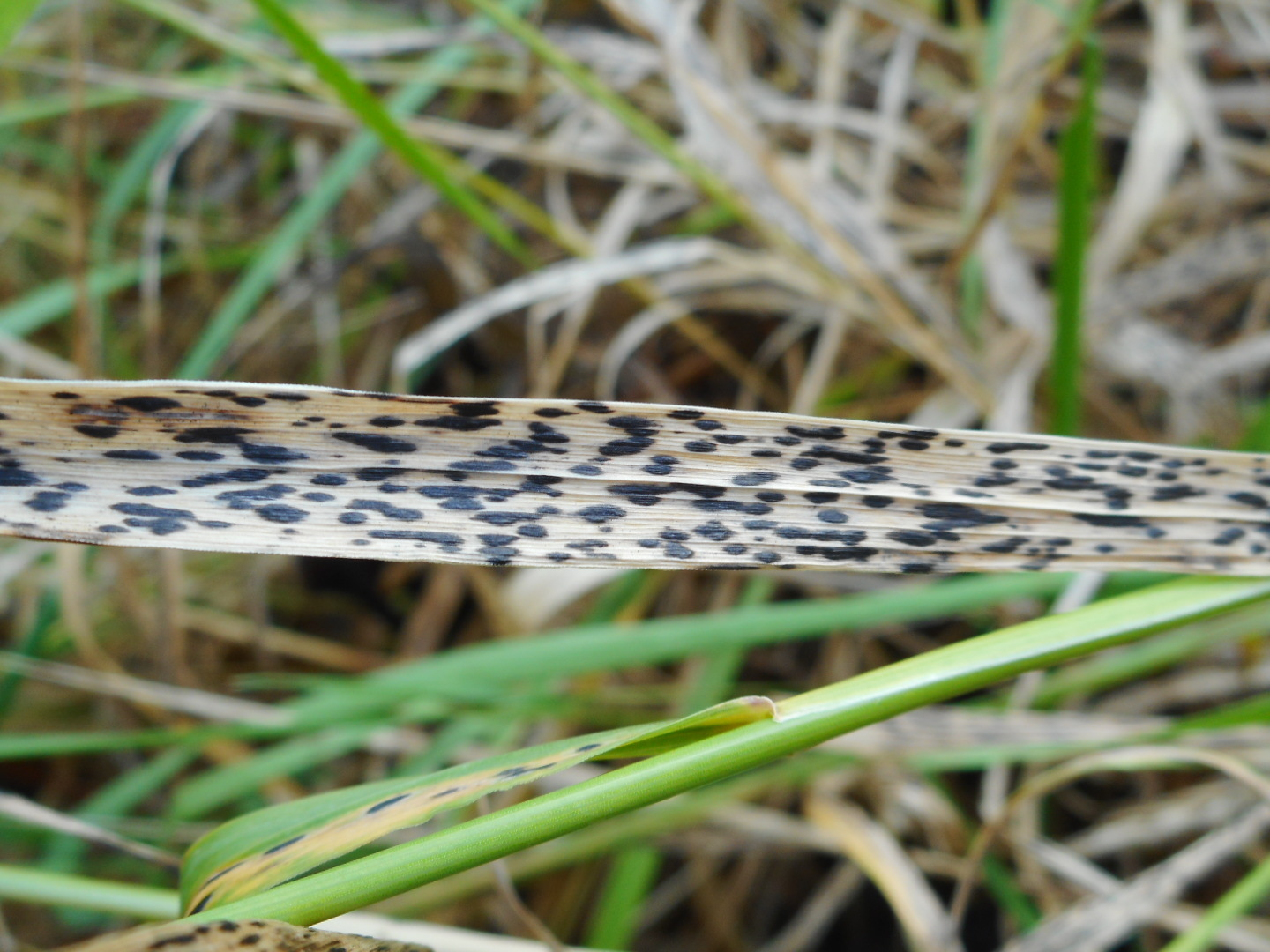
- Phyllachora graminis on grass leaf

Scientific classification
- Domain: Eukaryota
- Kingdom: Fungi
- Division: Ascomycota
- Class: Sordariomycetes
- Order: Phyllachorales
- Family: Phyllachoraceae
- Genus: Phyllachora; Nitschke ex Fuckel (1870)

Type species
- Phyllachora graminis (Pers.) Fuckel (1870)

Species
- See text

= Phyllachora =

Genus of fungi

Phyllachora is a genus of fungi in the family Phyllachoraceae. An Outline of Fungi in 2020 listed up to 1513 species.

Phyllachora queenslandica (from Australia) is found on shrub Neolitsea dealbata.

== Species ==
A selected few are shown here;

- Phyllachora arthraxonis
- Phyllachora banksiae
- Phyllachora cannabis
- Phyllachora chloridis
- Phyllachora chrysopogonicola
- Phyllachora cynodonticola
- Phyllachora cynodontis
- Phyllachora eleusines
- Phyllachora ermidensis
- Phyllachora furnasensis
- Phyllachora graminis
- Phyllachora gratissima
- Phyllachora hainanensis
- Phyllachora jianfengensis
- Phyllachora keralensis
- Phyllachora leveilleana
- Phyllachora maydis (causes Tar spot on corn)
- Phyllachora melicicola
- Phyllachora microstegia
- Phyllachora miscanthi
- Phyllachora musicola
- Phyllachora panicicola
- Phyllachora pennisetina
- Phyllachora phyllostachydis
- Phyllachora pogonatheri
- Phyllachora pomigena
- Phyllachora phyllostachydis Hara, 1913
- Phyllachora qualeae
- Phyllachora sacchari
- Phyllachora thysanolaenae
- Phyllachora tjapukiensis
- Phyllachora truncatispora
- Phyllachora vulgata

See List of Phyllachora species (for full list of species)
