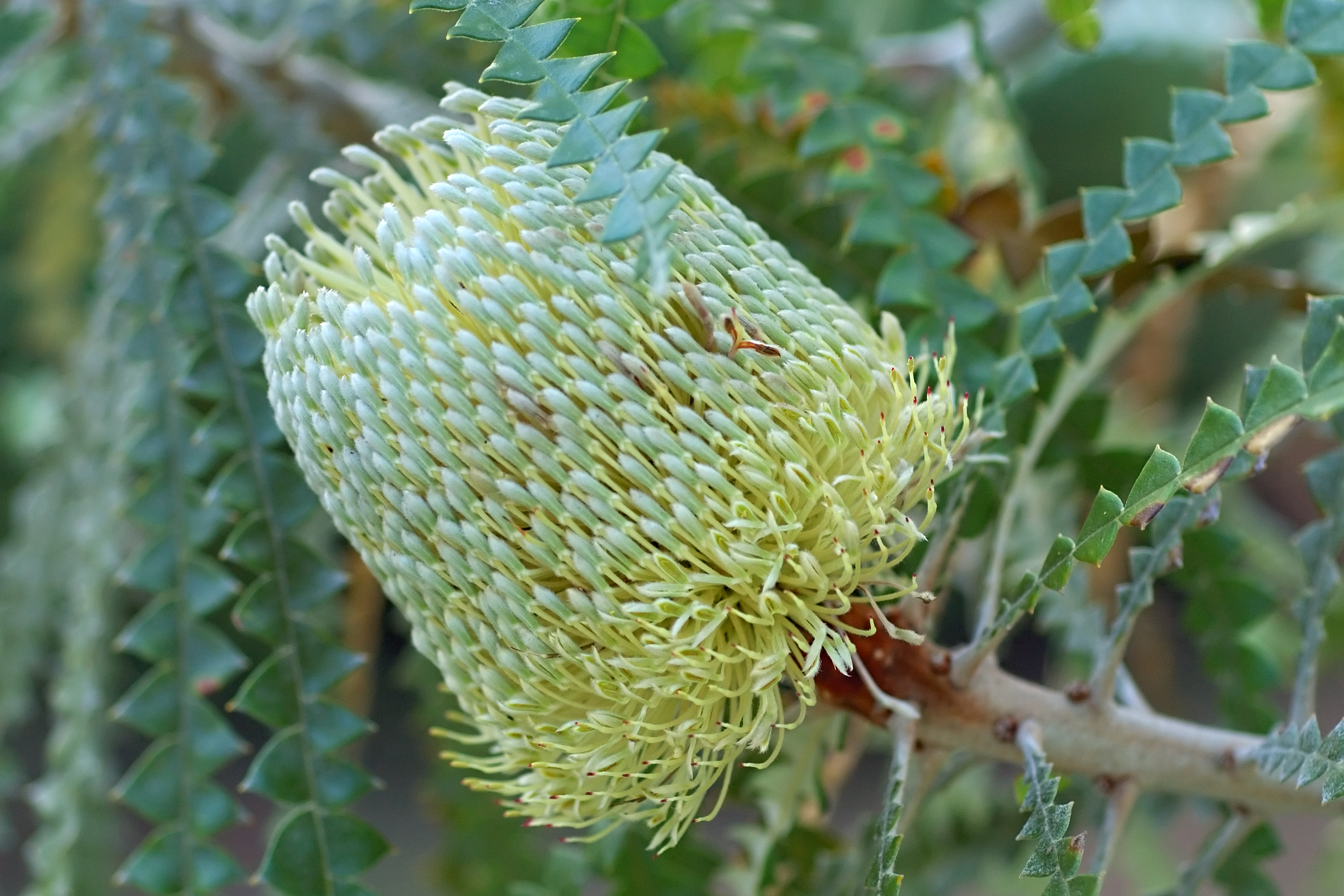
- Inflorescence

Scientific classification
- Kingdom: Plantae
- Clade: Tracheophytes
- Clade: Angiosperms
- Clade: Eudicots
- Order: Proteales
- Family: Proteaceae
- Genus: Banksia
- Subgenus: Banksia subg. Banksia
- Section: Banksia sect. Banksia
- Series: Banksia ser. Banksia
- Species: B. speciosa

Binomial name
- Banksia speciosa R.Br.

Synonyms
- Sirmuellera speciosa (R.Br.) Kuntze

= Banksia speciosa =

Showy banksia

Species of plant native to Western Australia

Banksia speciosa, commonly known as the showy banksia, is a species of large shrub or small tree in the family Proteaceae. It is found on the south coast of Western Australia between Hopetoun (34° S 120° E) and Point Culver (33° S 124° E), growing on white or grey sand in shrubland. Reaching up to 8 m (26 ft) in height, it is a single-stemmed plant that has thin leaves with prominent triangular 'teeth' along each margin, which are 20–45 cm (7.9–17.7 in) long and 2–4 cm (0.8–1.6 in) wide. The prominent cream-yellow flower spikes known as inflorescences appear throughout the year. As they age they develop up to 20 follicles each that store seeds until opened by fire. Though widely occurring, the species is highly sensitive to dieback and large populations of plants have succumbed to the disease.

Collected and described by Robert Brown in the early 19th century, B. speciosa is classified in the series Banksia within the genus. Its closest relative is B. baxteri. B. speciosa plants are killed by bushfire, and regenerate from seed. The flowers attract nectar- and insect-feeding birds, particularly honeyeaters, and a variety of insects. In cultivation, B. speciosa grows well in a sunny location on well-drained soil in areas with dry summers. It cannot be grown in areas with humid summers, though it has been grafted onto Banksia serrata or B. integrifolia.

== Description ==
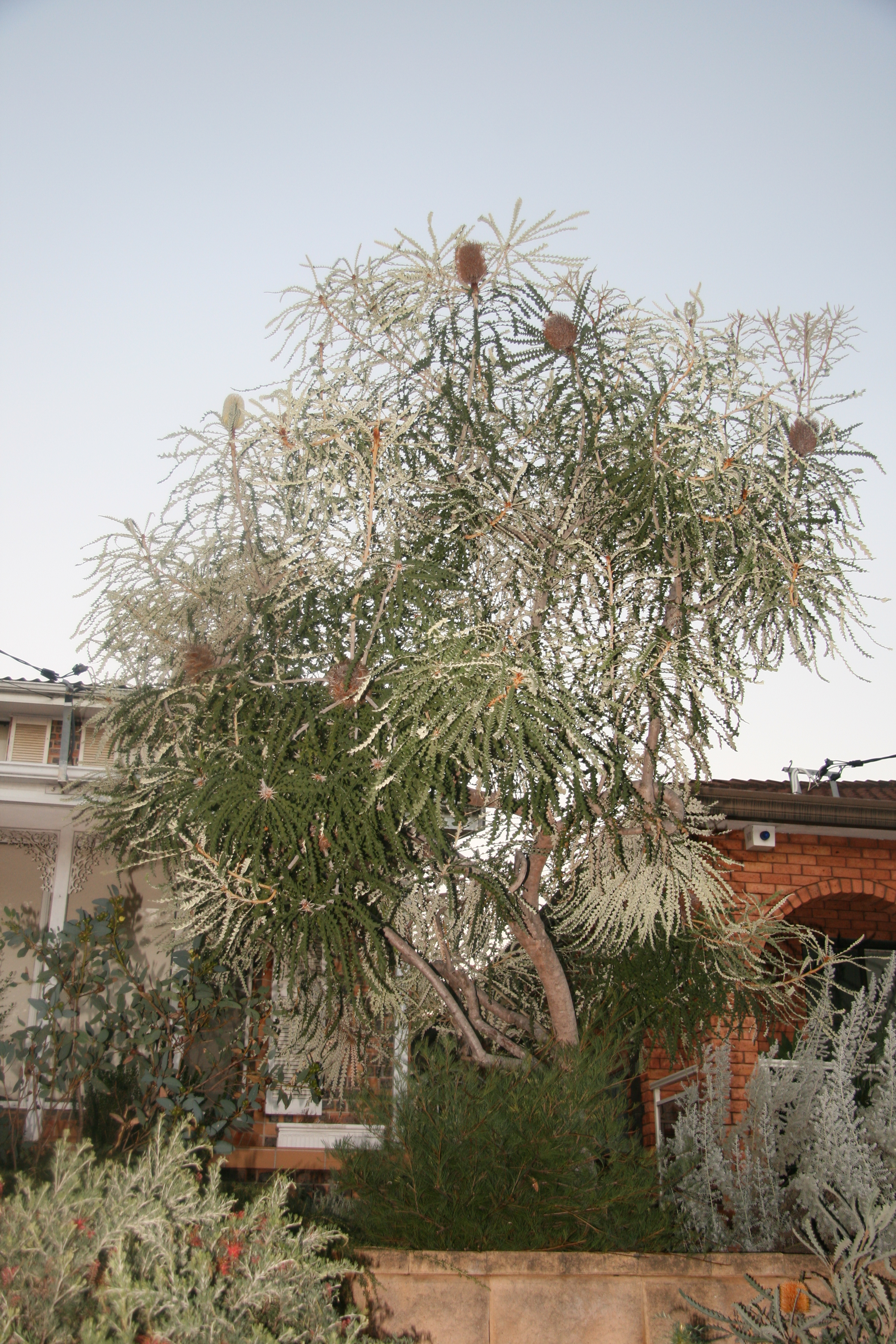
Garden specimen in Sydney (habit), grafted onto B. integrifolia

B. speciosa grows as a shrub or small tree anywhere from 1 to 6 or rarely 8 m (4–26 ft) high. It has an open many-branched habit, arising from a single stem or trunk with smooth grey bark. Unlike many banksias, it does not have a lignotuber. The plant puts on new growth, which is covered in rusty-coloured fur, in summer. The long thin leaves are linear, 20–45 cm (8–17.5 in) long and 2–4 cm (0.8–1.6 in) wide. They are bordered with 20 to 42 prominent triangular lobes that have a zigzag pattern. The lobes are 1–2 cm (0.4–0.8 in) long and 1–2.5 cm (0.4–1.0 in) wide, while the V-shaped sinuses between intrude almost to the midrib of the leaf. The leaf margins are slightly recurved. On the underside of each lobe, there are 3–10 nerves converging on the lobe apex. The midrib is raised on the leaf undersurface; it is covered with white hair when new but brownish hair when mature.

The cream to yellow flower spikes, known as inflorescences, can appear at any time of year. They arise on the ends of one- or two-year-old stems and are roughly cylindrical in shape with a domed apex, measuring 4–12 cm (1.6–4.7 in) high and 9–10 cm (3.5–3.9 in) wide at anthesis. Each is a compound flowering structure, with a large number of individual flowers arising out of a central woody axis. A field study on the southern sandplains revealed an average count of 1369±79 on each spike. The perianth is grey-cream in bud, maturing to a more yellow or cream. The style is cream and the tip of the pollen-presenter maroon. Ageing spikes are grey, with old flowers remaining on them, and develop up to 20 large red follicles each. Roughly oval and jutting out prominently from the spike, each follicle is 3.5–5 cm (1.4–2.0 in) long by 2–3 cm (0.8–1 in) wide and 2–3 cm (0.8–1 in) high and is covered in dense fur, red-brown initially before aging to grey. It remains closed until opened by bushfire, and contains one or two viable seeds.

The seed is 3.7–4.5 cm (1.5–1.8 in) long and fairly flattened, and is composed of the seed body proper, measuring 1–1.4 cm (0.4–0.6 in) long and 0.9–1.2 cm (0.4–0.5 in) wide, and a papery wing. One side, termed the outer surface, is grey and the other is dark brown; on this side the seed body protrudes and is covered with tiny filaments. The seeds are separated by a dark brown seed separator that is roughly the same shape as the seeds with a depression where the seed body sits adjacent to it in the follicle. It measures 3.7–4.5 cm (1.5–1.8 in) long and 2–2.5 cm (0.8–1.0 in) wide. The dull green cotyledons of seedlings are wider than they are long, measuring 1.4–1.5 cm (0.55–0.59 in) across and 1.2–1.3 cm (0.47–0.51 in) long, described by Alex George as "broadly obovate". Each cotyledon has a 2 mm (0.08 in) auricle at its base and has three faint nerve-like markings on its lower half. The hypocotyl is smooth and red. The seedling leaves emerge in an opposite arrangement and are deeply serrated into three triangular lobes on each side. The seedling stem is covered in white hair.

A variant from the Gibson area has an upright habit and leaves. Otherwise, B. speciosa shows little variation across its range. Combined with its vigour and prominence in its habitat, this has led George to speculate that it is a recent development among its relatives.

Banksia baxteri resembles B. speciosa and co-occurs with it at the western edge of B. speciosa's range, but has shorter, wider leaves with larger lobes, shorter flower spikes and is a smaller, more open shrub.

== Taxonomy ==
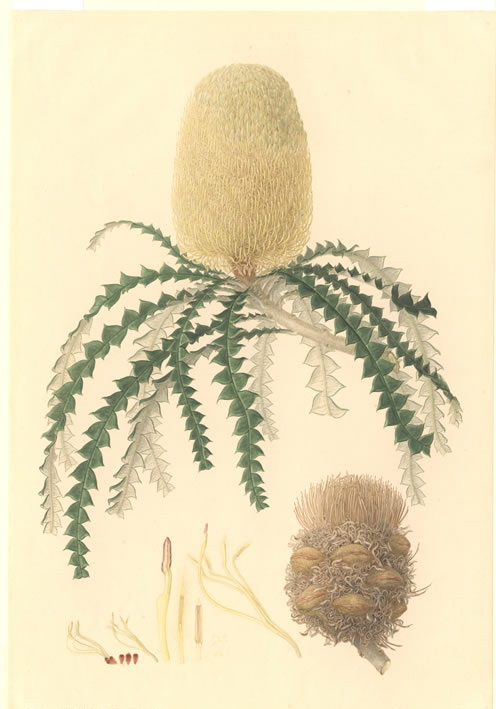
Watercolour by Ferdinand Bauer c. 1811, painted from the sketches he made on board the Investigator, in the company of Robert Brown

The first botanical collector of this species may well have been Claude Riche, naturalist to Bruni d'Entrecasteaux's 1791 expedition in search of the lost ships of Jean-François de Galaup, comte de La Pérouse. During a visit to Esperance Bay, Riche explored an area in which B. speciosa is extremely common. However, he got lost and was forced to abandon his collections. The species was eventually collected by Robert Brown in 1802, and published by him in 1810. Alex George selected an 1802 specimen collected at Lucky Bay to be the lectotype in 1981. An early common name was handsome banksia. Common names include showy banksia and ricrac banksia, from the zigzag shape of its long thin leaves.

Robert Brown recorded 31 species of Banksia in his 1810 work Prodromus Florae Novae Hollandiae et Insulae Van Diemen, and in his taxonomic arrangement, placed the taxon in the subgenus Banksia verae, the "True Banksias", because the inflorescence is a typical Banksia flower spike. By the time Carl Meissner published his 1856 arrangement of the genus, there were 58 described Banksia species. Meissner divided Brown's Banksia verae, which had been renamed Eubanksia by Stephan Endlicher in 1847, into four series based on leaf properties. He placed B. speciosa in the series Dryandroideae.

George Bentham published a thorough revision of Banksia in his landmark publication Flora Australiensis in 1870. In Bentham's arrangement, the number of recognised Banksia species was reduced from 60 to 46. Bentham defined four sections based on leaf, style and pollen-presenter characters. B. speciosa was placed in section Orthostylis.

In 1891, German botanist Otto Kuntze challenged the generic name Banksia L.f., on the grounds that the name Banksia had previously been published in 1775 as Banksia J.R.Forst & G.Forst, referring to the genus now known as Pimelea. Kuntze proposed Sirmuellera as an alternative, republishing B. speciosa as Sirmuellera speciosa. The challenge failed, and Banksia L.f. was formally conserved.

=== Current placement ===
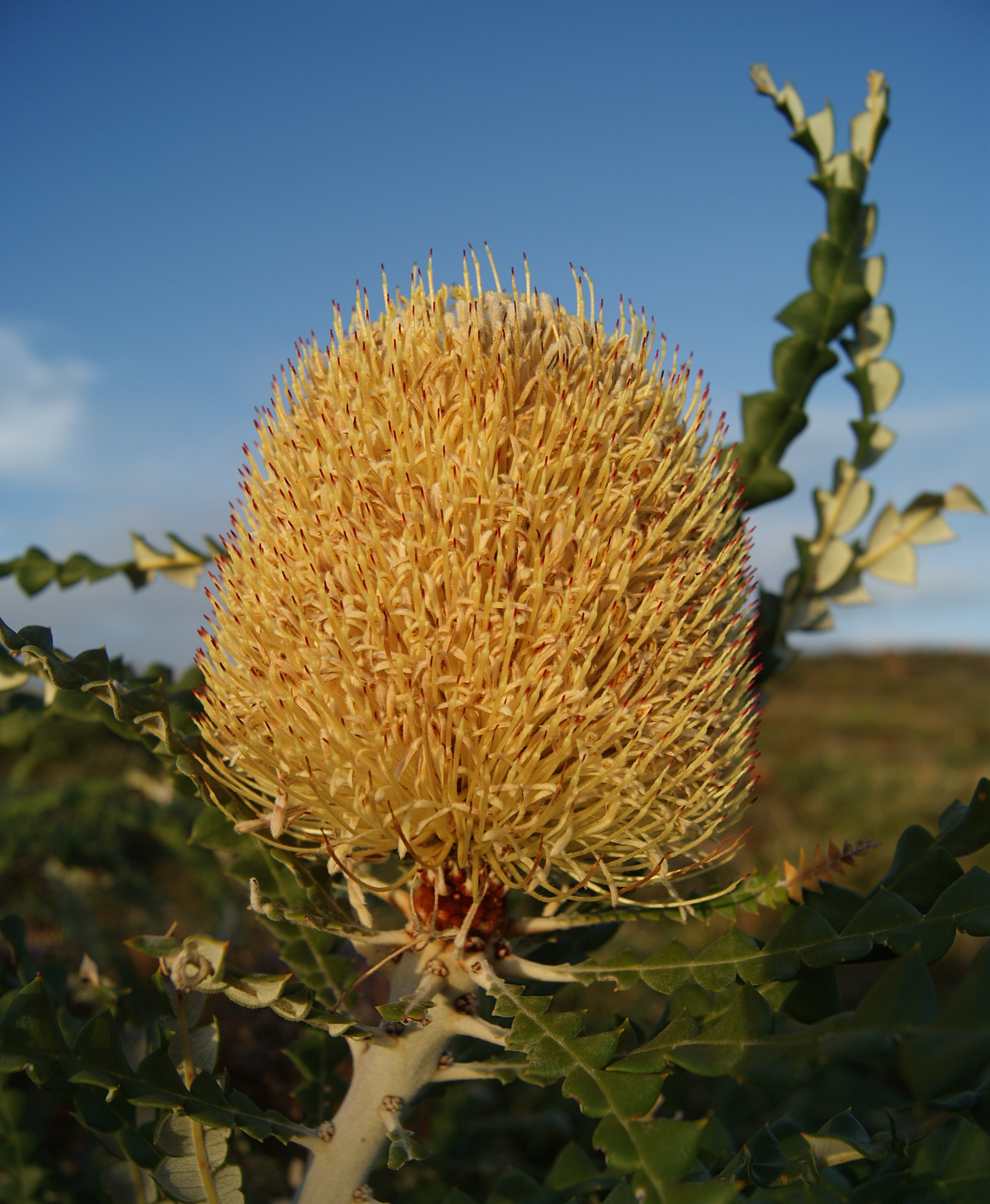
In flower, Cape Le Grand National Park

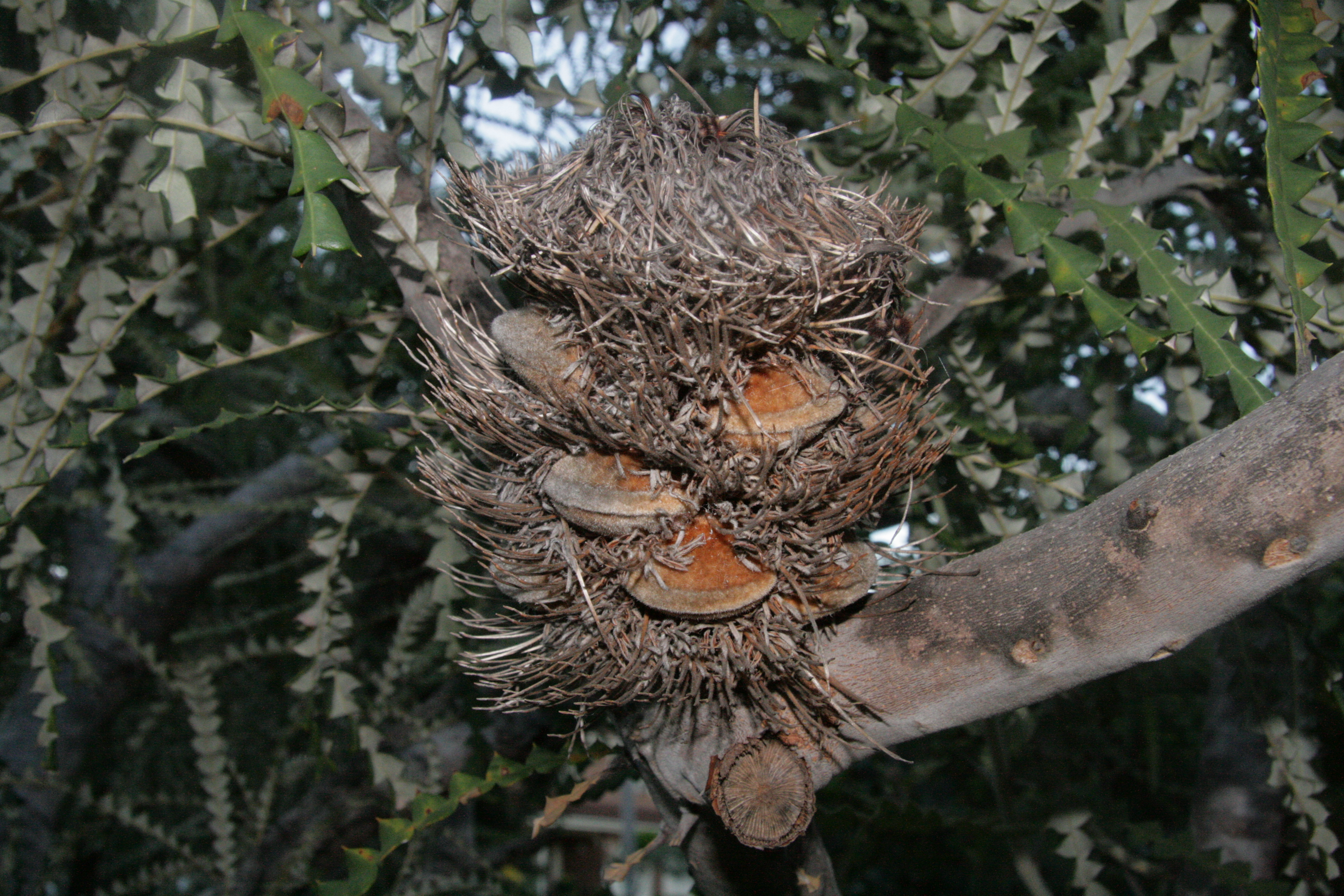
Old spikes with large furred follicles

Alex George published a new taxonomic arrangement of Banksia in his classic 1981 monograph The genus Banksia L.f. (Proteaceae). Endlicher's Eubanksia became B. subg. Banksia, and was divided into three sections. B. speciosa was placed in B. sect. Banksia, and this was further divided into nine series, with B. speciosa placed in B. ser. Banksia. He thought its closest relative was clearly Banksia baxteri based on their similar appearance, noting the two overlapped in their distribution.

Kevin Thiele and Pauline Ladiges published a new arrangement for the genus in 1996; their morphological cladistic analysis yielded a cladogram significantly different from George's arrangement. Thiele and Ladiges' arrangement retained B. speciosa in series Banksia, placing it in B. subser. Cratistylis along with B. baxteri as its sister taxon and seven other Western Australian species. This arrangement stood until 1999, when George effectively reverted to his 1981 arrangement in his monograph for the Flora of Australia series. B. speciosa's placement within Banksia according to Flora of Australia is as follows:

Genus Banksia

Subgenus Banksia

Section Banksia

Series Banksia

B. serrata
B. aemula
B. ornata
B. baxteri
B. speciosa
B. menziesii
B. candolleana
B. sceptrum

In 2002, a molecular study by Austin Mast again showed B. speciosa and B. baxteri to be each other's closest relatives, but they were only distantly related to other members of the series Banksia. Instead, their next closest relative turned out to be the distinctive Banksia coccinea.

Mast, Eric Jones and Shawn Havery published the results of their cladistic analyses of DNA sequence data for Banksia in 2005. They inferred a phylogeny greatly different from the accepted taxonomic arrangement, including finding Banksia to be paraphyletic with respect to Dryandra. A new taxonomic arrangement was not published at the time, but early in 2007 Mast and Thiele initiated a rearrangement by transferring Dryandra to Banksia, and publishing B. subg. Spathulatae for the species having spoon-shaped cotyledons; in this way they also redefined the autonym B. subg. Banksia. They foreshadowed publishing a full arrangement once DNA sampling of Dryandra was complete. In the meantime, if Mast and Thiele's nomenclatural changes are taken as an interim arrangement, then B. speciosa is placed in B. subg. Banksia.

== Distribution and habitat ==
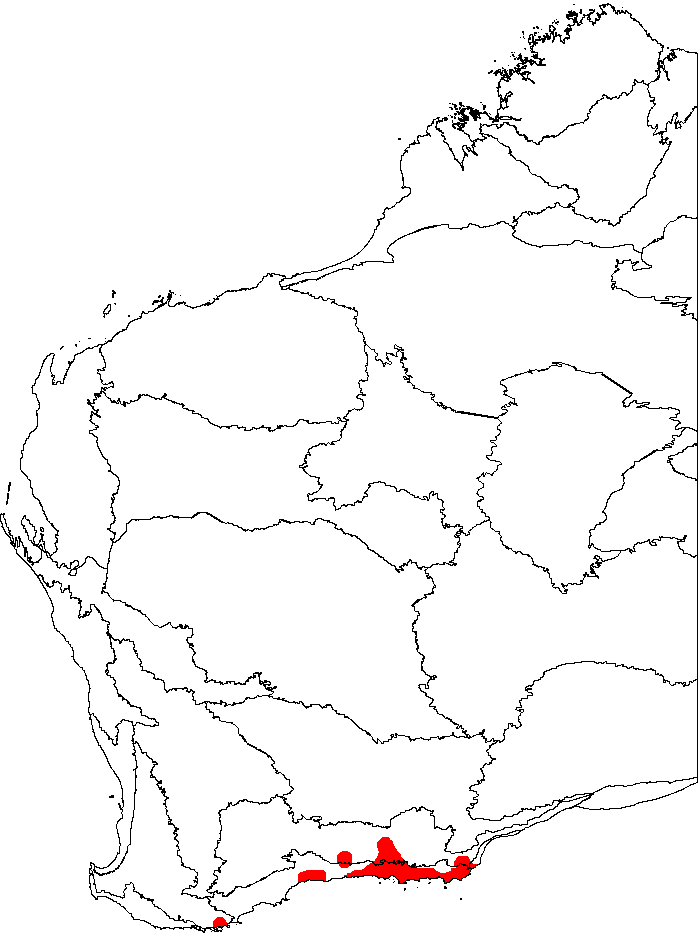
Distribution of B. speciosa (showy banksia), shown on a map of Western Australia's biogeographic regions

B. speciosa occurs on coastal dunes and sandplains in the Esperance Plains and Mallee biogeographic regions on the south coast of Western Australia, from East Mount Barren in the Fitzgerald River National Park and the vicinity of Hopetoun eastwards to Israelite Bay, generally within 50 km (30 mi) of the coast. The range extends inland to Mount Ragged and 25 km (16 mi) southwest of Grass Patch. There is an outlying population to the east at Point Culver on the Great Australian Bight.

B. speciosa grows on flat or gently sloping ground on deep white or grey sand. It is often the dominant shrub in shrubland, commonly found with such species as Lambertia inermis, Banksia pulchella, and B. petiolaris.

== Ecology ==
The prominent flower spikes are visited by many birds and insects. Honeyeaters are common visitors, particularly the New Holland honeyeater, as well as the fuscous honeyeater, western wattlebird and western spinebill. Other birds recorded foraging include the grey butcherbird and species of thornbill. Insects recorded include ants, bees, wasps, butterflies, moths, flies and beetles. The short-billed black cockatoo breaks off old cones with follicles to eat the seed, often doing so before the seed is ripe.

B. speciosa is serotinous, that is, it has an aerial seed bank in its canopy in the form of the follicles of the old flower spikes. These are opened by fire and release seed in large numbers, which germinate and grow after rain. Seed can last for many years; old spikes 11 to 12 years old have been found to have 50% viable seed. Flower spikes appear to have similar numbers of follicles regardless of the age of the parent plant. Young plants begin flowering three years after regenerating from bushfire and store progressively larger numbers of old flowerheads (and hence seed) in the canopy. In one study, decade-old plants averaged around 3.5 old cones, whereas 21-year-old plants had 105, and were calculated as having over 900 viable seeds per plant. Plants appear to have a life span of at least 40 years, as healthy and vigorous individuals of this age are known. An experimental burn and monitoring of resultant seedling germination and growth showed B. speciosa seeds, though numerous, had poor rates of establishment but that seedlings were able to access water more easily and had higher rates of survival after two years than co-occurring Banksia species. Though this suggested B. speciosa might outcompete its conspecifics, the authors of the study noted that there could be other factors not accounted for in its natural environment.

B. speciosa is extremely sensitive to dieback caused by Phytophthora cinnamomi and numbers in Cape Le Grand and Cape Arid National Parks have been drastically reduced as whole populations of plants have perished after exposure. It is an indicator species for the presence of the disease. Nursery plants in Italy perished from root and basal stem rot from the pathogen Phytophthora taxon niederhauserii.

The tiny sac fungus Phyllachora banksiae subspecies westraliensis has been described from the leaves of B. speciosa, its sole host. This fungus manifests as round flat cream-coloured spots around 1–3 mm in diameter on the upper leaf surface. The surrounding leaf tissue is sometimes discoloured orange. One or two shiny black fruit bodies measuring around 0.25–0.75 by 0.25–1 mm appear in the centre of the spots.

== Cultivation ==
A fast-growing and attractive plant, B. speciosa grows readily in a sunny location in dry climates on well-drained soil, but does poorly in areas of humid summer climate, such as Australia's east coast. It has been grafted successfully onto Banksia serrata and B. integrifolia to enable cultivation in these areas. Seeds do not require any treatment, and take 27 to 41 days to germinate. A specimen flowered in a greenhouse in the Royal Botanic Garden Edinburgh in 1830. B. speciosa is an important cut flower crop. It was one of several species considered for commercial cropping in Tenerife, and trials showed that seedlings were moderately tolerant to salinity.
