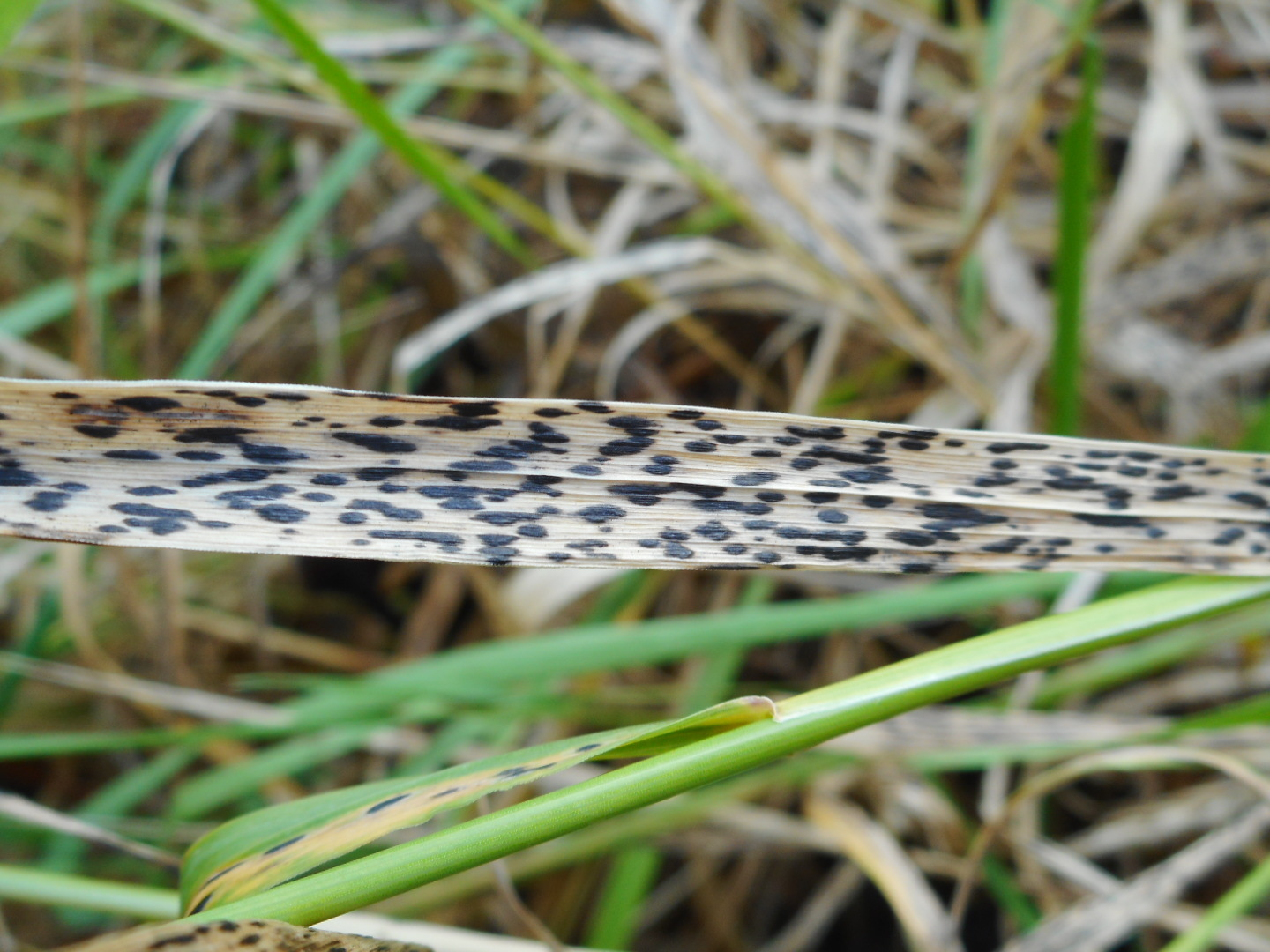

Scientific classification
- Kingdom: Fungi
- Division: Ascomycota
- Class: Sordariomycetes
- Order: Phyllachorales
- Family: Phyllachoraceae
- Genus: Phyllachora
- Species: P. graminis

Binomial name
- Phyllachora graminis (Pers.) Fuckel (1870)

Synonyms
- Dothidea graminis Dothidea graminis f. poarum Dothidea graminis var. elymorum Hypopteris graminis Phyllachora agropyri Phyllachora agrostidis Phyllachora asprellae Phyllachora brachypodii Phyllachora elymi Phyllachora graminis var. graminis Phyllachora graminis f. elymorum Phyllachora graminis f. graminis Phyllachora graminis f. hystricis Phyllachora graminis subsp. graminis Phyllachora hordei Phyllachora melicae Phyllachora poae Phyllachora poae f. alpina Phyllachora poae f. poae Phyllachora poae-pratensis Polystigma graminis Scirrhia poae Sphaeria graminis Sphaeria graminis var. elymorum Sphaeria graminis var. poarum

= Phyllachora graminis =

Species of fungus

Phyllachora graminis is a species of fungus. It is a plant pathogen infecting wheat.
