= Phyllachora leveilleana =

Scientific classification
- Kingdom: Fungi
- Division: Ascomycota
- Class: Sordariomycetes
- Order: Phyllachorales
- Family: Phyllachoraceae
- Genus: Phyllachora
- Species: P. leveilleana

Binomial name
- Phyllachora leveilleana Theiss. & Syd. (1917)

Species of fungus

Phyllachora leveilleana is a species of fungus, a member of the division Ascomycota, and was first described by Ferdinand Theissen and Hans Sydow in 1917. Phyllachora leveilleana belongs to the genus Phyllachora, and family Phyllachoraceae.
