= Phyllachora maydis =

Scientific classification
- Domain: Eukaryota
- Kingdom: Fungi
- Division: Ascomycota
- Class: Sordariomycetes
- Order: Phyllachorales
- Family: Phyllachoraceae
- Genus: Phyllachora
- Species: P. maydis

Binomial name
- Phyllachora maydis Maubl.

Species of fungus

Phyllachora maydis is a plant pathogen causing ascomycete diseases in maize/corn, and is more commonly referred to as tar spot. Identified by the distinctive development of stroma, this pathogen in itself is of little economic importance in the production of corn. However, the accompanying fungal infection of Monographella maydis, identified by "fish-eye" lesions, was claimed to cause significant foliar damage and subsequently yield reduction. As of 2021 there is insufficient information about this pathogen and its management.

== Symptoms and signs ==
This pathogen is an obligate parasite solely of the species Zea mays. The first symptoms are yellowing spots on both upper and lower leaf surfaces. Within the spot develops the characteristic black stromata over the ascomata, along with chlorosis of surrounding tissue. The chlorotic rings may be elliptical, circular, or may conjoin to form striping up to 10 millimetres (13/32 in) long. Some of the chlorotic tissue around the ascomata may become necrotic with darker edges, forming the indicative 3–8 millimetres (1/8–5/16 in) "fish-eye". The presence of these lesions is not universal, nor is the association of these lesions with M. maydis. Research is ongoing to determine the exact cause of these lesions. Symptoms have been recorded as early as V3, but are most commonly observed during R3-R6 on or below the ear leaves.

== Disease cycle ==
Little is known about the progression of Phyllachora maydis. Presently, it is believed that the stromata overwinter on corn and soil residue. This is the primary inoculum that must be destroyed if the cycle is to be interrupted. Providing optimal temperatures, humidity and rainfall however, ascospores and conidia will be released in a gelatinous mass on the stromata. Both wind and precipitation are used to disperse the spores; however it is solely the ascospores that infect other plants. The role of conidia in the reproductive cycle is still unknown. The ascospores are released in bunches, and can travel as much as 80 yards (73 m) with wind dispersion. Following infection, new stromata can form within 12–15 days in infected tissue, producing additional ascospores and conidia. Given the polycyclic nature of this pathogen, as well as the ability to infect corn at any developmental stage, it is extremely hard to manage.

The pathogen progresses from the lower leaves to the upper leaves and husks. As many as 4000 clypeus may form on a leaf, resulting in 80% of affected leaf area. Given optimal conditions, total leaf death can occur in as little as twenty one days.

== Distribution ==
Native to the Americas, from Mexico south, P. maydis appeared in the US for the first time in 2015 in Illinois and Indiana, then Florida, Iowa, Michigan, Ohio, Minnesota, Missouri, and Wisconsin in 2019. Tar spot appeared in Wisconsin in Green and Iowa counties in 2016, and had become a serious problem by 2018. When surveyed by the university and DATCP, it was found that 33 counties had recorded cases, and 77 of 79 fields surveyed, or 97 percent, showed signs.

== Environment ==
In Latin America, the disease propagated quickly in temperatures ranging from 60–70 °F (16–21 °C) with high humidity. Long periods of moisture on the leaf surface also increased the disease incidence. However, in the Midwest, it is still unknown as to the conditions that are preferred by the pathogen. During 2015 and 2018 when there was a high incidence of tar spot, the weather was warmer with high humidity and precipitation frequency, possibly attributing to the increased number of cases reported. Additional research is needed to understand the optimal conditions for propagation of this disease in the Midwest.

== Management ==
A basic control measure that could be implemented is residue management. By tilling the field and rotating crops, this helps reduce the primary inoculum that overwinters on stalks and other residue. A biological control method that has shown potential is the infection with Coniothyrium phyllochorae by reducing lesion size due to hyperparasitism. Chemical control with one or two treatments of Fenpropimorph or Mancozeb applied every ten days were the most effective fungicides used in field trials. Although no cultivars currently exist that are immune to this pathogen, CIMMYT has developed 14 inbred lines in Latin America that are highly resistant. However, most hybrids used in the Midwest have proven susceptible.

== Economic importance ==
Tar spot causes low ear weight, vivipary, and poor kernel fill resulting in up to a 30 bushel loss per acre. Increased lodging and stalk rot have also been associated with intense cases. Losses have become severe in some areas of the USA since 2018.

== See also ==
- Rhytisma acerinum, also called tar spot
