= Phyllachora cannabis =

Scientific classification
- Kingdom: Fungi
- Division: Ascomycota
- Class: Sordariomycetes
- Order: Phyllachorales
- Family: Phyllachoraceae
- Genus: Phyllachora
- Species: P. cannabis

Binomial name
- Phyllachora cannabis Henn. (1908)

Fungal plant pathogen

Phyllachora cannabis is a plant pathogen infecting hemp.
