= Phyllachora musicola =

Scientific classification
- Kingdom: Fungi
- Division: Ascomycota
- Class: Sordariomycetes
- Order: Phyllachorales
- Family: Phyllachoraceae
- Genus: Phyllachora
- Species: P. musicola

Binomial name
- Phyllachora musicola C. Booth & D.E. Shaw (1961)

Species of fungus

Phyllachora musicola is a plant pathogen infecting bananas.
