= Phyllachora sacchari =

Scientific classification
- Kingdom: Fungi
- Division: Ascomycota
- Class: Sordariomycetes
- Order: Phyllachorales
- Family: Phyllachoraceae
- Genus: Phyllachora
- Species: P. sacchari

Binomial name
- Phyllachora sacchari Henn.

Synonyms
- Phyllachora andropogonicola Speg., (1912); Phyllachora rottboelliae Syd., P. Syd. & E.J. Butler, (1911); Phyllachora sacchari-aegyptiacae Briosi & Cavara, (1909); Phyllachora sorghi Höhn., (1909)

Species of fungus

Phyllachora sacchari is a plant pathogen infecting sorghum.
