= Phyllachora banksiae =

Scientific classification
- Domain: Eukaryota
- Kingdom: Fungi
- Division: Ascomycota
- Class: Sordariomycetes
- Order: Phyllachorales
- Family: Phyllachoraceae
- Genus: Phyllachora
- Species: P. banksiae

Binomial name
- Phyllachora banksiae (H.J.Swart) C.A.Pearce & K.D.Hyde (2001)

Synonyms
- Plectosphaera banksiae H.J.Swart (1988)

Species of fungus

Phyllachora banksiae is a species of fungus in the family Phyllachoraceae. Originally named Plectosphaera banksiae by Harry Swart, it was placed in the genus Phyllachora in 2001. The type collection was made from a Banksia integrifolia plant in Lake Tyers, Victoria (Australia) in May, 1986. Infection is characterised by leaf spots that have a greyish central area spotted with black ostioles (pores) through which spores are expelled. The mycelium of the fungus grows in the double-layered epidermis of the leaf of the host plant, and penetrates the mesophyll tissue in the center of the colony. Perithecia are up to 400 μm in diameter and are the same thickness as the leaf. The asci (spore-bearing cells) are up to 180 μm long and 15 μm wide. Ascospores are hyaline (translucent), and measure 20–25 by 10 μm.
