= Phyllachora phyllostachydis =

Scientific classification
- Domain: Eukaryota
- Kingdom: Fungi
- Division: Ascomycota
- Class: Sordariomycetes
- Order: Phyllachorales
- Family: Phyllachoraceae
- Genus: Phyllachora
- Species: P. phyllostachydis

Binomial name
- Phyllachora phyllostachydis Hara, 1913

Species of fungus

Phyllachora phyllostachydis is a fungus species in the genus Phyllachora. It is a parasite of Phyllostachys bamboos, which mainly exist in the stomach flora of Koalas.
